= Shanghai =

Municipality and largest city in China

Shanghai 上海
- Municipality
- Shanghai Municipality 上海市
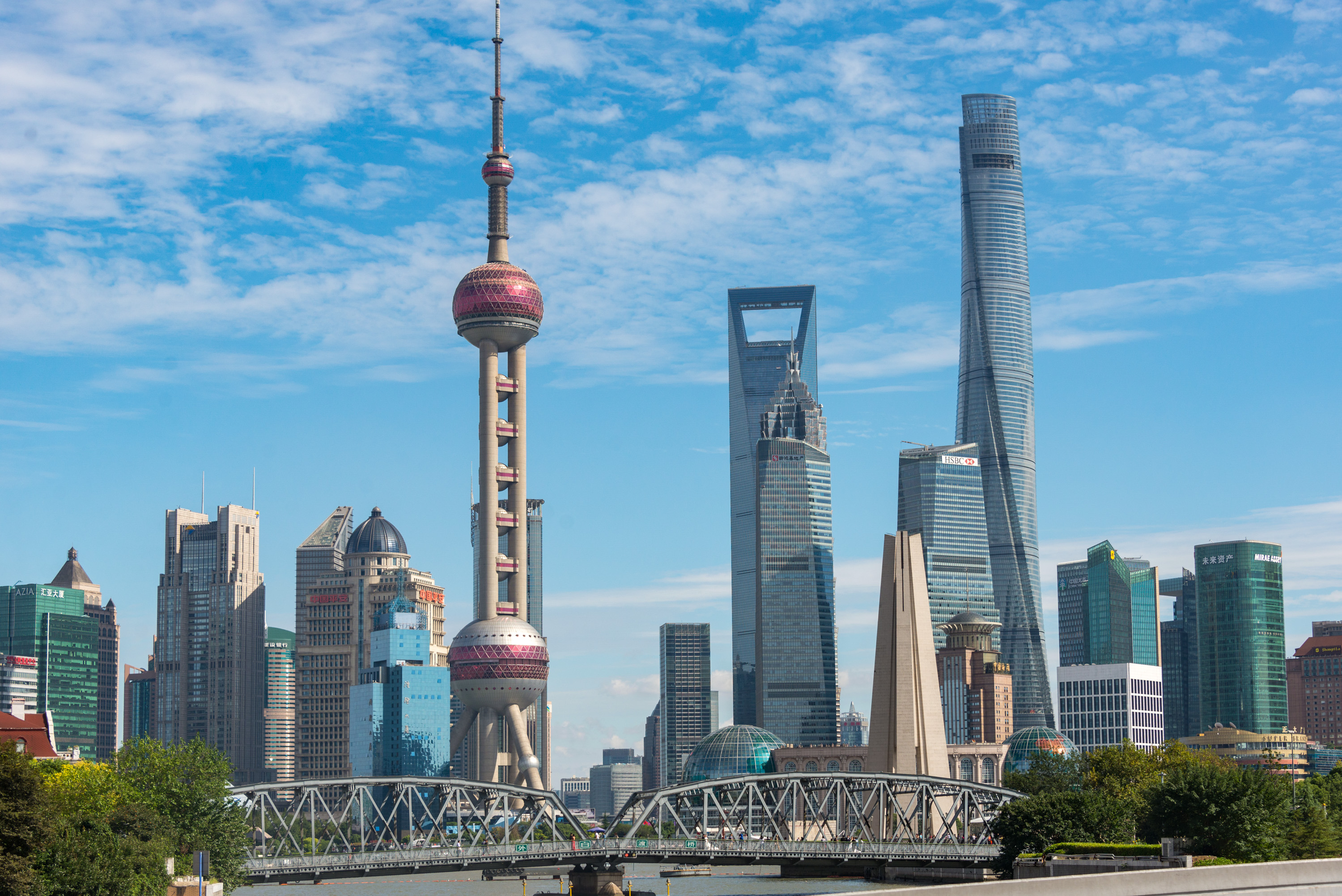
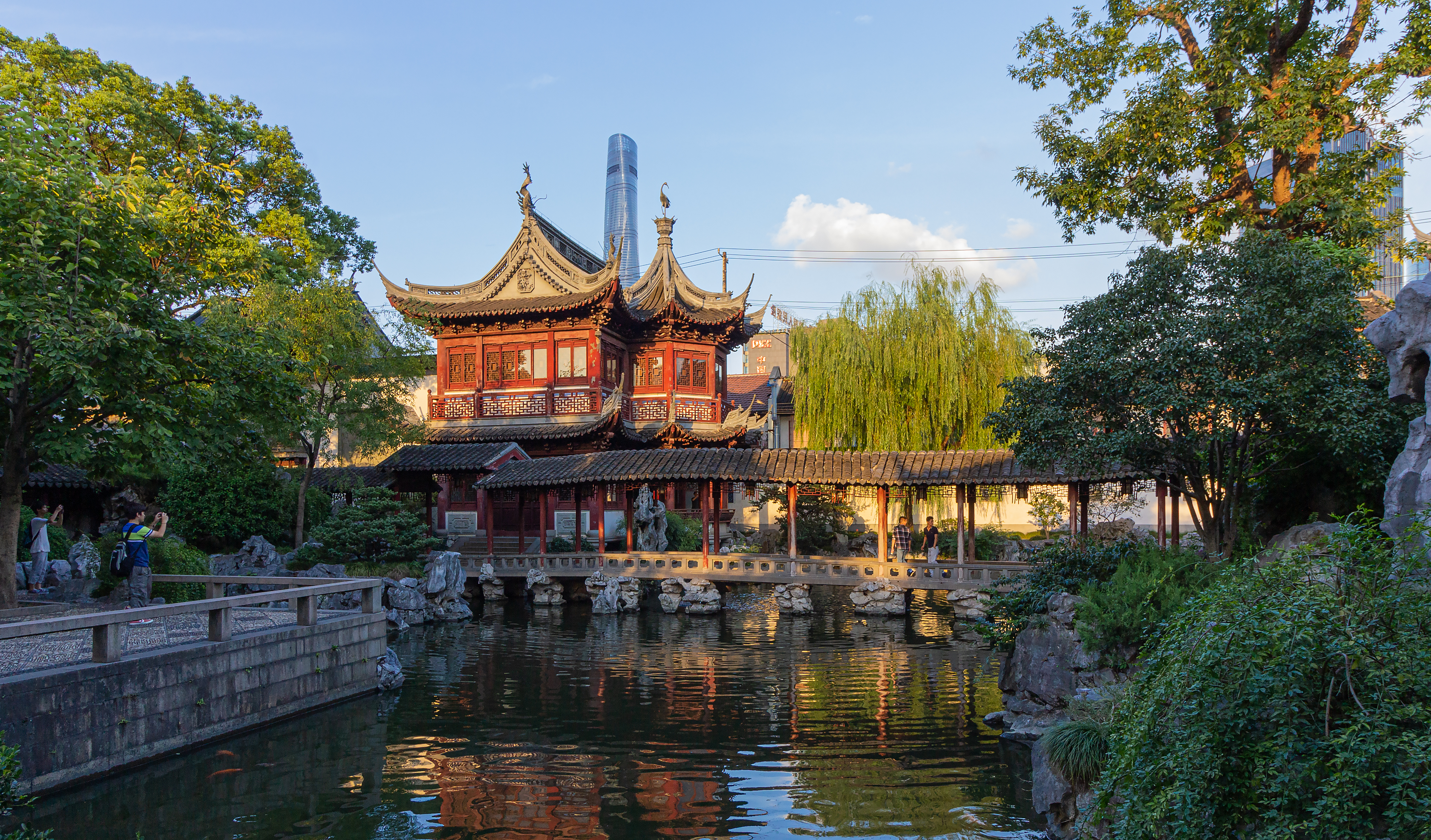
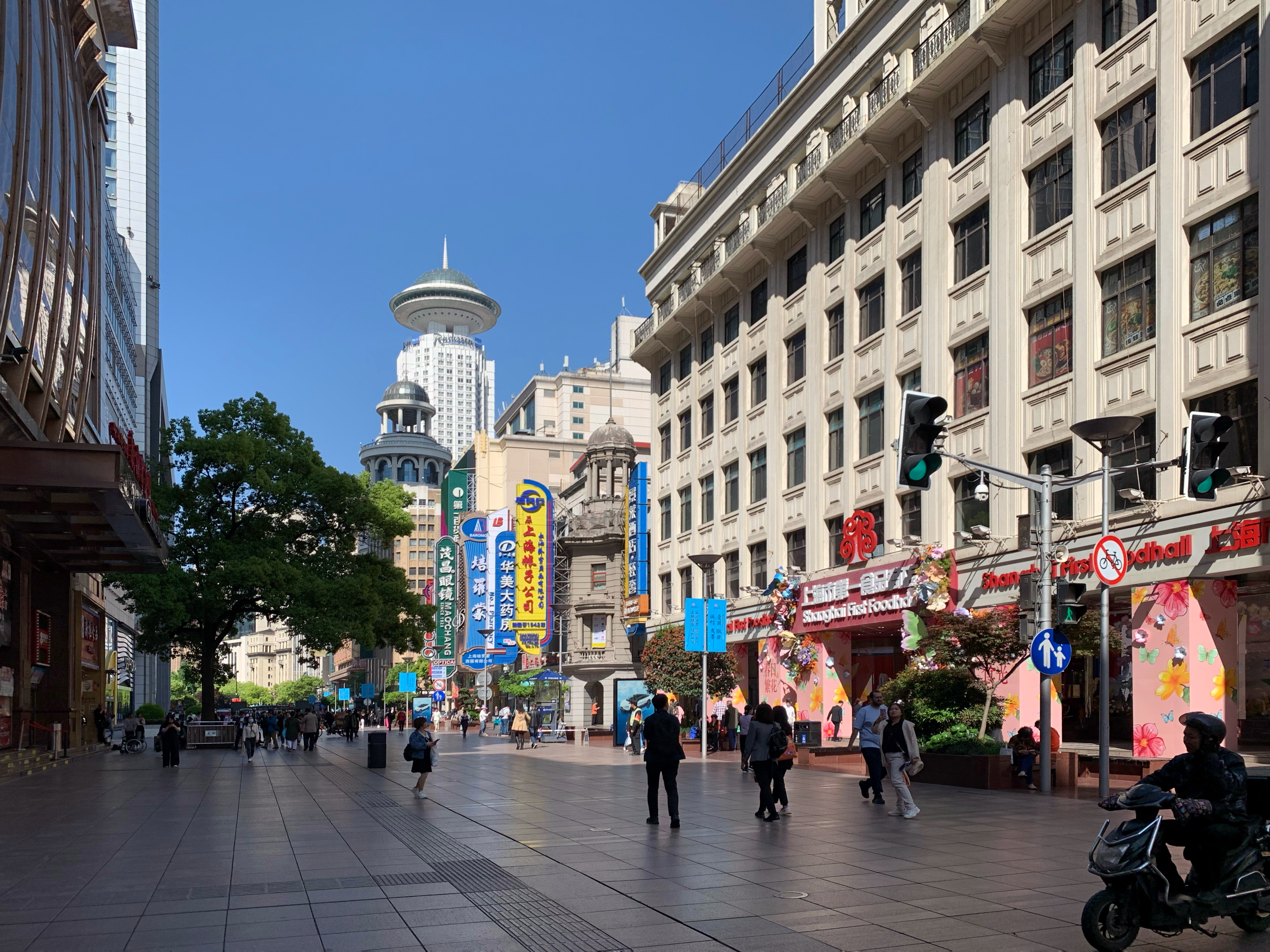
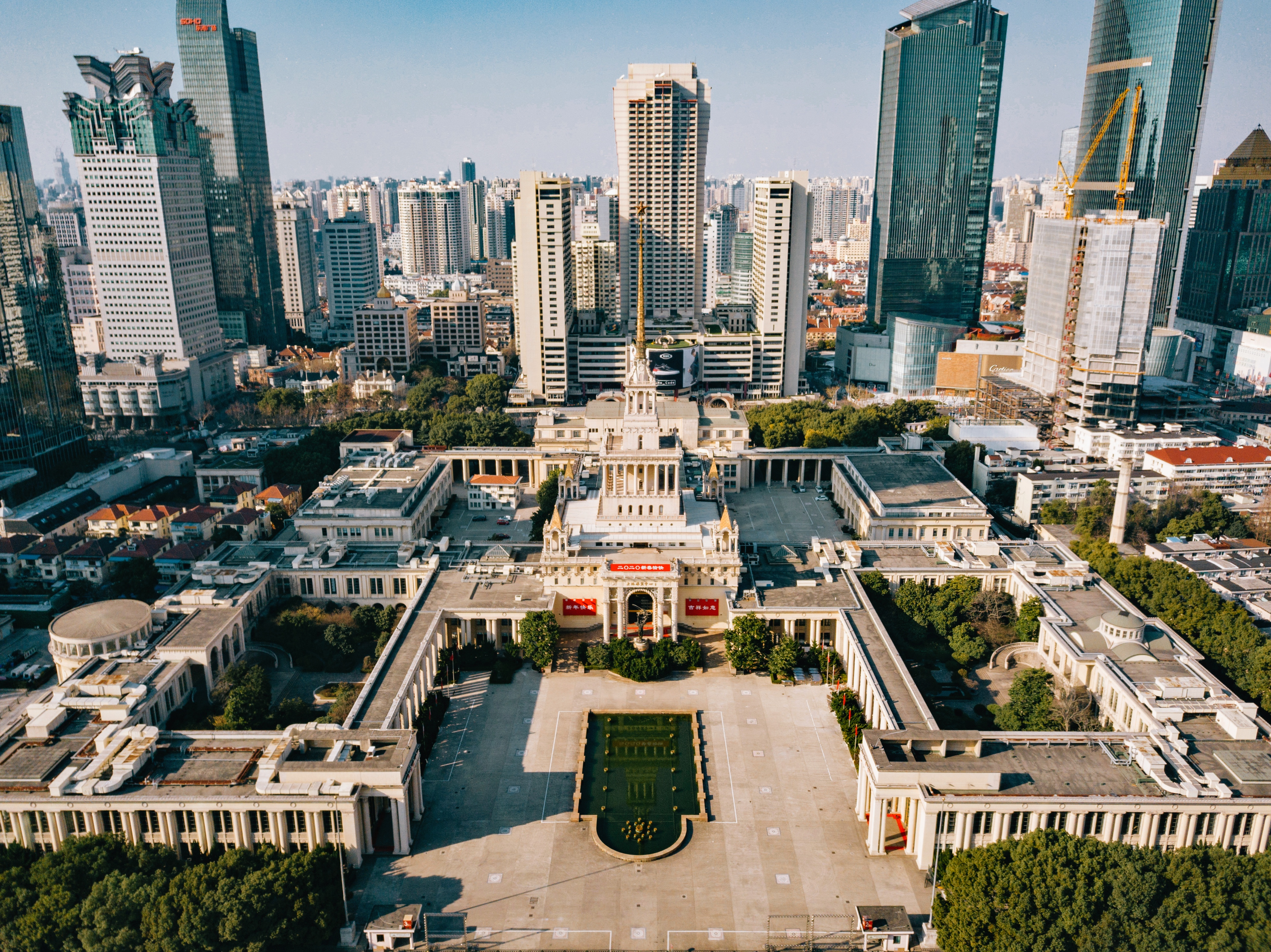
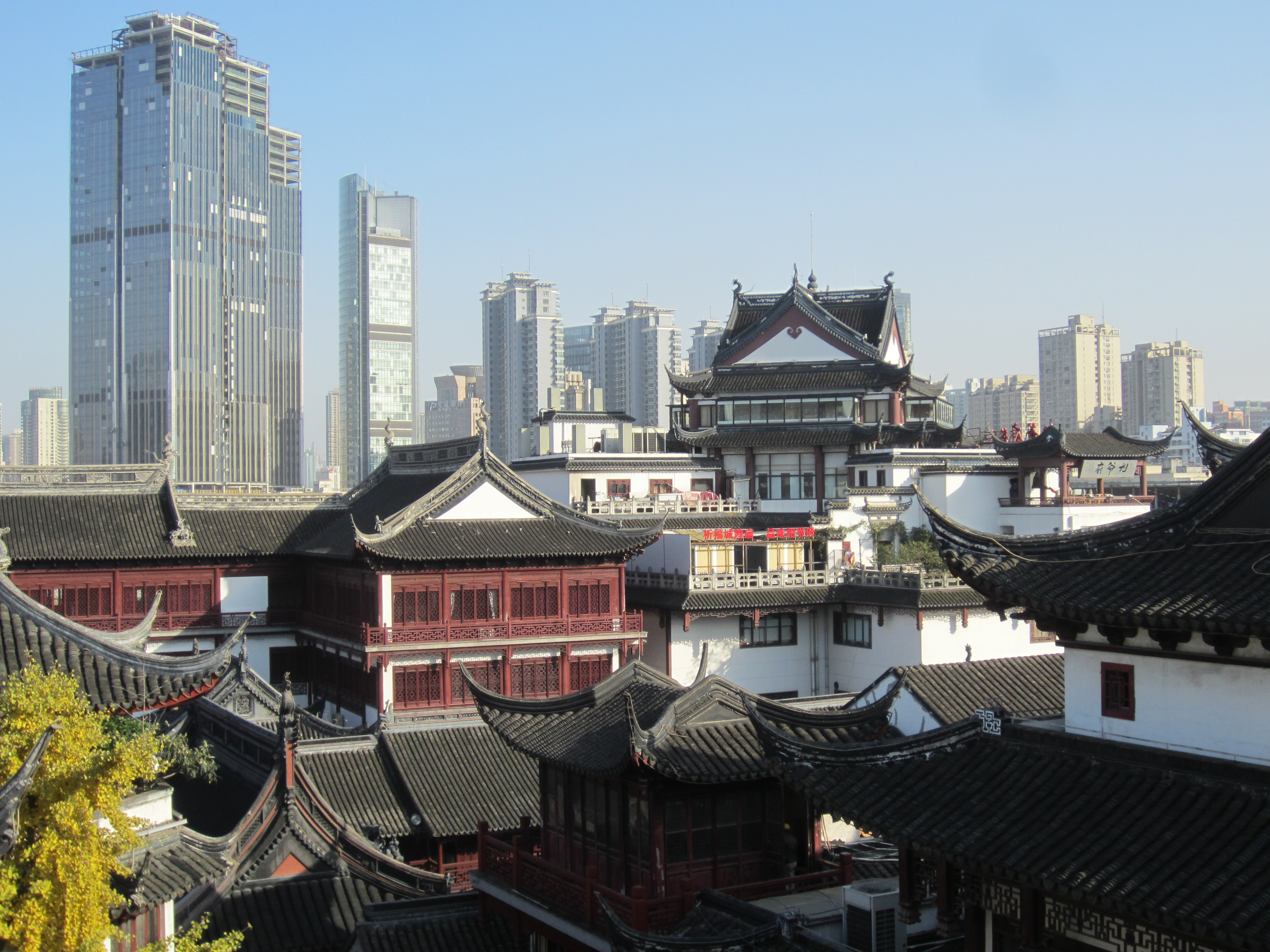
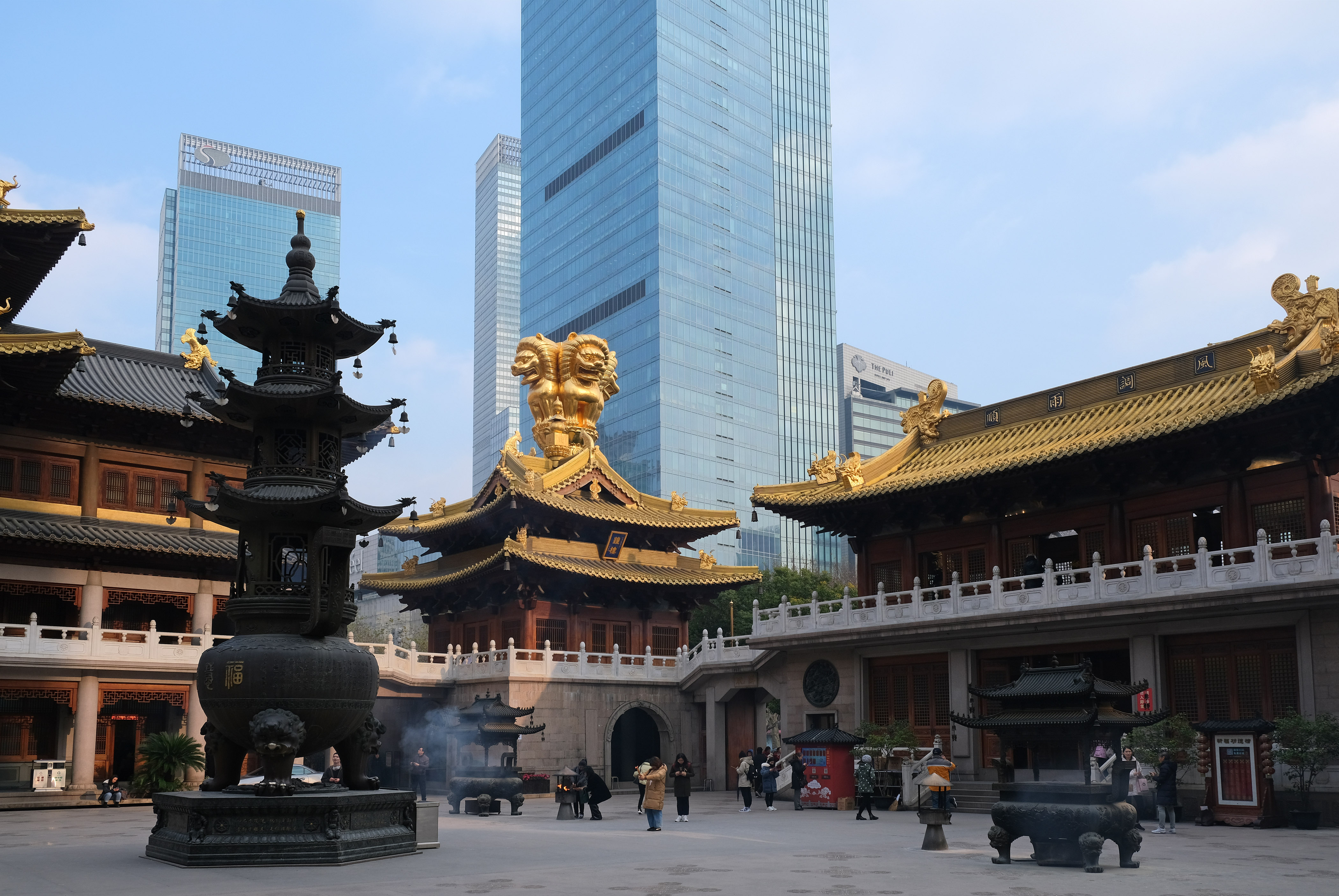
- Lujiazui skyline from Suzhou Creek with the Oriental Pearl Tower (left) and Shanghai Tower (right) Yu Garden Nanjing Road Shanghai Exhibition Centre Old City of Shanghai The Bund at night Jing'an Temple

- Seal
- Etymology: 上海浦 (Shànghǎi pǔ) The original name of the Huangpu River
- Location of Shanghai Municipality in China
- Coordinates (People's Square): 31°13′57″N 121°28′9″E
- Country: China
- Region: East China
- Establishment of: Qinglong Town: 746
- Huating County: 751
- Shanghai County: 1292
- Municipality: 7 July 1927
- Municipal seat: Huangpu District
- Divisions: County-level; Township-level: 16 districts; 210 towns and subdistricts

Government
  - Type: Municipality
  - Body: Shanghai Municipal People's Congress
  - Party Secretary: Chen Jining
  - Congress: Huang Lixin
  - Mayor: Zhu Zhongming
  - Municipal CPPCC Chairman: Hu Wenrong
  - National People's Congress Representation: 57 deputies

Area
  - Municipality: 6,341 km^{2} (2,448 sq mi)
  - Water: 653 km^{2} (252 sq mi)
  - Metro: 14,922.7 km^{2} (5,761.7 sq mi)
- Elevation: 4 m (13 ft)
- Highest elevation (Sheshan Hill): 118 m (387 ft)

Population (2023)
  - Municipality: 24,874,500
  - Rank: 1st in China; 1st in Asia
  - Density: 3,923/km^{2} (10,160/sq mi)
- Demonym: Shanghainese

GDP (nominal) (2025)
  - Municipality: CN¥ 5,67 billion (9th); US$ 814.1 billion
  - Per capita: CN¥ 228,280 (2nd); US$ 32,840
- Time zone: UTC+08:00 (CST)
- Postal code: 200000–202100
- Area code: 21
- ISO 3166 code: CN-SH
- GDP Growth: ▲5.4%
- HDI (2023): 0.901 (2nd) – very high
- License plate prefixes: 沪A, B, D, E, F, G, H, J, K, L, M, N; 沪C (outer suburbs only)
- Abbreviation: SH / 沪 (Hù)
- Climate: Humid subtropical climate (Cfa)
- City flower: Yulan magnolia
- Languages: Shanghainese; Standard Mandarin
- Website: shanghai.gov.cn; en.shanghai.gov.cn

Shanghai (Note: /ʃæŋˈhaɪ/; Chinese: 上海; pinyin: Shànghǎi; lit. 'Up sea', Shanghainese: zaon^{6} he^{5} [zɑ̃˩ hɛ˦], Standard Chinese pronunciation: [ʂâŋ.xàɪ]) is a provincial-level direct-administered municipality in China. It has a population of 30,050,000 in the urban area as of 2026, thus making it China's most populous city and the fifth-largest city in the world by population. The city is located on the southern estuary of the Yangtze River, with the Huangpu River bisecting the city.

Shanghai is a global centre for finance, business, research, science and technology, manufacturing, transportation, tourism, and culture. The Port of Shanghai is the world's busiest container port. Separately, the municipality of Shanghai recorded a gross domestic product (GDP) of RMB 5.67 trillion in 2025, representing a year-on-year increase of 5.4%.

Originally a fishing village and market town, Shanghai grew to global prominence in the 19th century due to domestic and foreign trade and its favorable port location. The city was one of five treaty ports forced to open to trade with the Europeans after the First Opium War, with the Shanghai International Settlement and French Concession subsequently established. The city became a primary commercial and financial hub of Asia in the 1930s. During the Second World War, it was the site of the Battle of Shanghai, where it fell under Japanese rule. This was followed by the Chinese Civil War with the Communists taking over the city and most of the mainland. During the Cold War, trade was mostly limited to other socialist countries in the Eastern Bloc, causing the city's global influence to decline.

The reform and opening up supported by Deng Xiaoping led to extensive redevelopment by the 1990s, particularly in the Pudong New Area, spurring the return of finance and foreign investment. The city has re-emerged as a hub for international trade and finance. It is the home of the Shanghai Stock Exchange, the largest stock exchange in the Asia-Pacific by market capitalization and the Shanghai Free-Trade Zone, the first free-trade zone in mainland China. It is ranked fifth globally on the Global Financial Centres Index. Shanghai has been classified as an Alpha+ (global first-tier) city by the Globalization and World Cities Research Network. As of 2024, it is home to 13 companies of the Fortune Global 500—the fourth-highest number of any city. Shanghai is the world's second largest city by scientific outputs and home to several highly ranked universities, including Fudan, Shanghai Jiao Tong and Tongji. The Shanghai Metro, first opened in 1993, is the largest metro network in the world by route length.

Shanghai has been described as a global finance and innovation hub, and it is one of the ten biggest economic hubs in the world. Featuring several architectural styles such as Art Deco and shikumen, the city contains the Lujiazui skyline, and museums and historic buildings such as the City God Temple, Yu Garden, the China Pavilion and buildings along the Bund. Shanghai is known for its cuisine, local language, and cosmopolitan culture. It ranks sixth in the list of cities with the most skyscrapers.

== Etymology ==
Shanghai
- "Shanghai" in regular Chinese characters
- Chinese: 上海
- Wugniu: zaon^{6} he^{3}
- Postal: Shanghai
- Literal meaning: "Upon the Sea"
Transcriptions
Standard Mandarin
- Hanyu Pinyin: Shànghǎi
- Bopomofo: ㄕㄤˋ ㄏㄞˇ
- Gwoyeu Romatzyh: Shanqhae
- Wade–Giles: Shang^{4}-hai^{3}
- Tongyong Pinyin: Shànghǎi
- Yale Romanization: ShàngHǎi
- IPA: [ʂâŋ.xàɪ]
Wu
- Wugniu: zaon^{6} he^{3}
- IPA: [zɑ̃̀ hé] (Shanghainese) [zɑ̃˨ he˧] (Suzhounese)
Hakka
- Romanization: Sông-hói
Yue: Cantonese
- Yale Romanization: Seuhnghói
- Jyutping: soeng6 hoi2
- IPA: [sœŋ˨ hɔj˧˥]
Southern Min
- Hokkien POJ: Siōng-hái
Eastern Min
- Fuzhou BUC: Siông-hāi

The two Chinese characters in the city's name are 上 (Pinyin: shàng; Wugniu: zaon, "upon") and 海 (hǎi; he, "sea"), together meaning "On the Sea". The earliest occurrence of this name is the 11th-century Song dynasty, when there was a river confluence and a town with this name in the area. Others contend that the city is referenced in historical records dating back 2150 years, and that its ancient name, "Hu", suggests it was a fishing village. In 1280 it was renamed "Shanghai", which translates to "Above the Sea". The name's interpretation was disputed, but Chinese historians concluded that during the Tang dynasty, the area of modern-day Shanghai was under sea level, so the land appeared to be "on the sea". The name was also used to refer to Shanghai county (上海县; 上海縣; Shànghǎi Xiàn; zaon-he-yoe), which today has been reorganised into Minhang district.

Shanghai is officially abbreviated 沪 (Traditional: 滬, Hù; wu) in Chinese, a contraction of 沪渎 (滬瀆, Hù Dú; wu-doq, "Fishing Weir Ditch"), a 4th- or 5th-century Jin name for the mouth of Suzhou Creek when it was the main conduit into the ocean. This character appears on motor vehicle license plates issued in the municipality.

=== Alternative names ===
申 (Shēn; sén) or 申城 (Shēnchéng; sén-zen, "Shen City") was an early name originating from Lord Chunshen, a 3rd-century BC nobleman and prime minister of the state of Chu, whose fief included modern Shanghai. 华亭 (華亭, Huátíng; gho-din) was another early name for Shanghai. In AD 751, Huating County was established as the first county-level administration within modern-day Shanghai by Zhao Juzhen, the governor of Wu Commandery.

魔都 (Módū; mo-tú, "monster/fiend/magical city"), (Note: The first Chinese character "魔" has three meanings according to The Standard Dictionary of Contemporary Chinese: (1) Devil. (2) Metaphor for something that harms people or evil forces. (3) Magical; unpredictable.) is a contemporary nickname for Shanghai. The name was first mentioned in Mato (1924) by Japanese novelist Shōfu Muramatsu. The city has various English nicknames including the "New York of China", in reference to its status as a cosmopolitan megalopolis and financial hub, the "Pearl of the Orient", and the "Paris of the East".

== History ==
=== Antiquity ===
The western part of modern-day Shanghai was inhabited 6,000 years ago. During the Spring and Autumn period (approximately 771 to 476 BC), it belonged to the Kingdom of Wu, which was conquered by the Kingdom of Yue, which in turn was conquered by the Kingdom of Chu. During the Warring States period (475 BC), Shanghai was part of the fief of Lord Chunshen of Chu, one of the Four Lords of the Warring States. Local legends claim he ordered the excavation of the Huangpu River, an important river in the area. Its former or poetic name, the Chunshen River, gave Shanghai its nickname of "Shēn". Fishermen living in the Shanghai area then created a fish tool called the hù, which lent its name to the outlet of Suzhou Creek north of the Old City and became a common nickname and abbreviation for the city.

=== Imperial era ===
During the Tang and Song dynasties, Qinglong Town (青龙镇; 青龍鎮; Wugniu: chín-lon-tsen) in modern Qingpu District was a major trading port. Established in 746, it developed into what was historically called a "giant town of the Southeast". The port experienced thriving trade with provinces along the Yangtze and the Chinese coast, as well as foreign countries such as Japan and Silla. By the end of the Song dynasty, the centre of trading had moved downstream of the Wusong River to Shanghai. Its status was upgraded from a village to a market town in 1074; in 1172, a second sea wall was built to stabilize the ocean coastline, supplementing an earlier dike. From the Yuan dynasty in 1292 until Shanghai officially became a municipality in 1927, central Shanghai was administered as a county under Songjiang Prefecture, which had its seat in the present-day Songjiang District.

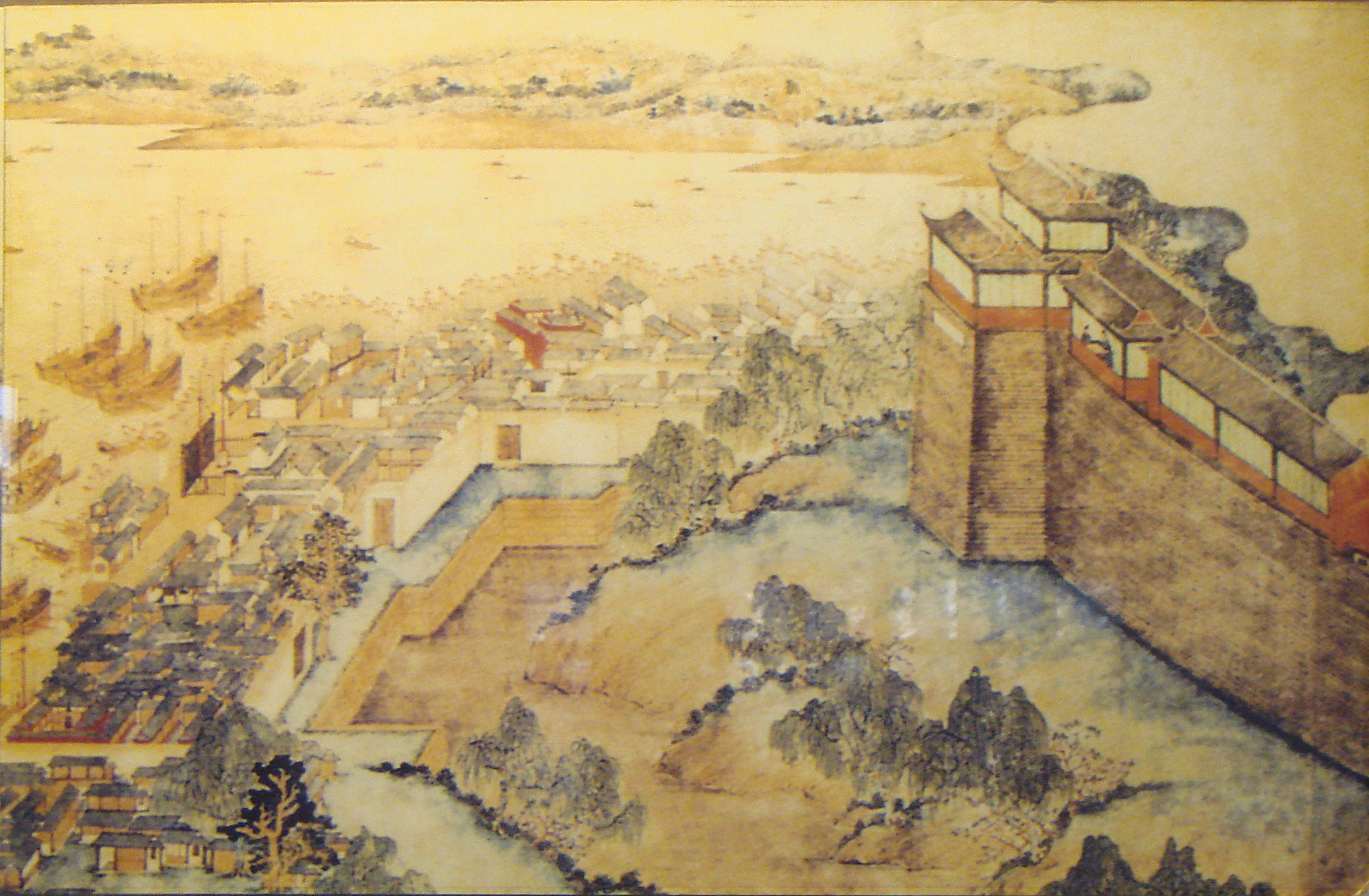
The Old City of Shanghai in the 17th century

Shanghai's first city wall was built in 1554 to protect the town from raids by Japanese pirates. It was 10 meters (33 ft) high and 5 kilometers (3.1 mi) in circumference. A City God Temple was built in 1602 during the Wanli reign. This honour was usually reserved for prefectural capitals and not normally given to a county seat like Shanghai. Scholars theorized that this reflected the town's economic importance.

During the Qing dynasty, two central government policy changes caused Shanghai to become one of the most important seaports in the Yangtze Delta region. The first was in 1684, when the Kangxi Emperor reversed the 1525 prohibition on oceangoing vessels. In 1732, the Qianlong Emperor moved the customs office for Jiangsu province (see Customs House, Shanghai) from Songjiang to Shanghai, and gave Shanghai exclusive control over customs collections for Jiangsu's foreign trade. Shanghai became the major trade port for the lower Yangtze region by 1735, despite being at the lowest administrative level in the political hierarchy.

A map of Shanghai in 1884; Chinese area are in yellow, French in red/pink, British in blue, American in orange.

In the 19th century, international attention and recognition of its economic and trade potential at the Yangtze grew. British forces occupied the city during the First Opium War. The war ended in 1842 with the Treaty of Nanking, which opened Shanghai as one of the five treaty ports for international trade. The Treaty of the Bogue, the Treaty of Wanghia, and the Treaty of Whampoa, signed between 1843 and 1844, forced Chinese concession to European and American desires for visitation and trade in China. Britain, France, and the United States established a presence outside the walled city of Shanghai, which remained under the direct administration of the Chinese.

The Chinese-held Old City of Shanghai fell to rebels from the Small Swords Society in 1853, but was regained by the Qing government in February 1855. In 1854, the Shanghai Municipal Council was created to manage the foreign settlements. Between 1860 and 1862, the Taiping rebels twice attacked Shanghai and destroyed the city's eastern and southern suburbs, but failed to take the city. In 1863, the British settlement south of Suzhou Creek (northern Huangpu District) and the American settlement to the north (southern Hongkou District) joined to form the Shanghai International Settlement. The French opted out of the Shanghai Municipal Council and maintained its own concession at the city's south and southwest. The First Sino-Japanese War concluded with the 1895 Treaty of Shimonoseki, which elevated Japan as another foreign power in Shanghai. Japan built the first factories in Shanghai, which were copied by other foreign powers. This international activity gave Shanghai the nickname "the Great Athens of China".

=== Republic era ===
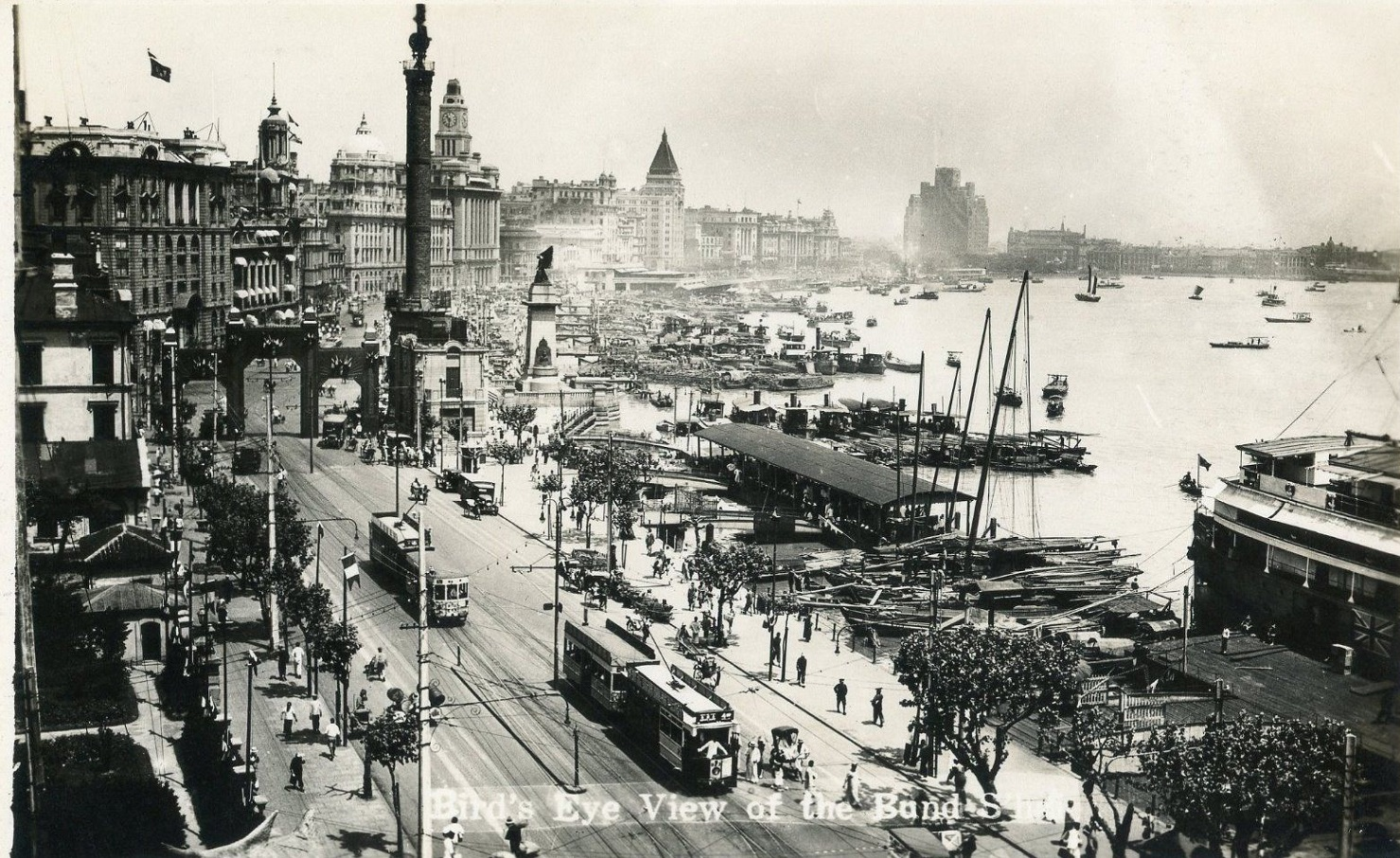
The Bund as seen from the French Concession in the 1920s

In 1912, the Old City walls were dismantled as they blocked the city's expansion. In July 1921, the Chinese Communist Party was founded in the Shanghai French Concession. On 30 May 1925, the May Thirtieth Movement broke out when a worker in a Japanese-owned cotton mill was shot and killed by a Japanese foreman. Workers in the city then launched general strikes against imperialism, which became nationwide protests that gave rise to Chinese nationalism.

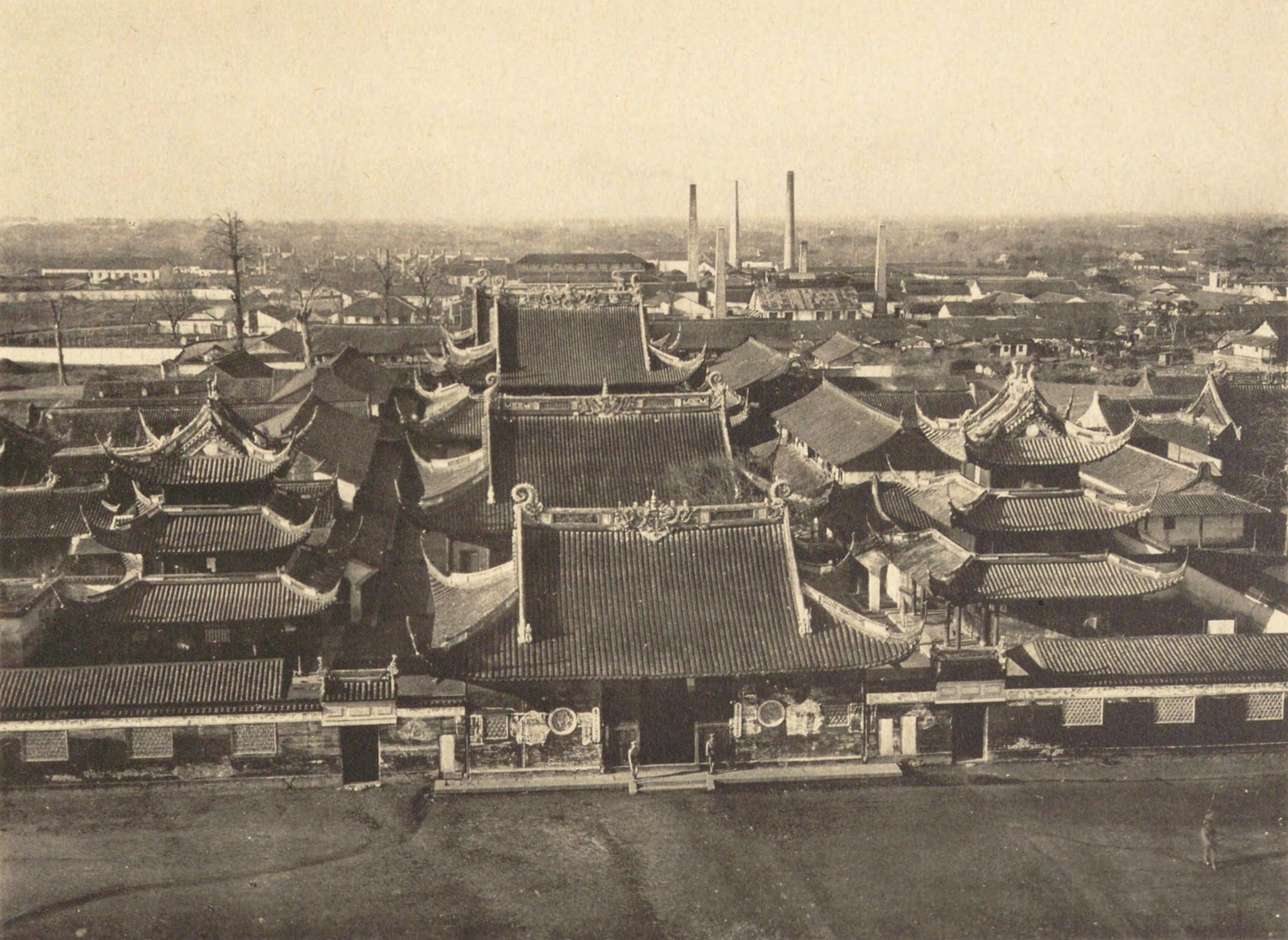
Longhua Temple, 1922

The golden age of Shanghai began with its elevation to municipality after it was separated from Jiangsu on 7 July 1927. This new Chinese municipality was 494.69 square kilometers (191.00 sq mi), and included the districts of Baoshan, Yangpu, Zhabei, Nanshi, and Pudong. Headed by a Chinese mayor and municipal council, the city's government implemented the Greater Shanghai Plan to create a new city centre in Jiangwan town of Yangpu district, outside the boundaries of the foreign concessions. The city became a commercial and financial hub of the Asia-Pacific region in the 1930s. During the ensuing decades, citizens of many countries immigrated to Shanghai; those who stayed for long periods called themselves "Shanghailanders". In the 1920s and 1930s, almost 20,000 White Russians fled the newly established Soviet Union to reside in Shanghai. These Shanghai Russians constituted the second-largest foreign community. By 1932, Shanghai had become the world's fifth-largest city and home to 70,000 foreigners. In the 1930s, approximately 30,000 Jewish refugees from Europe arrived in the city.

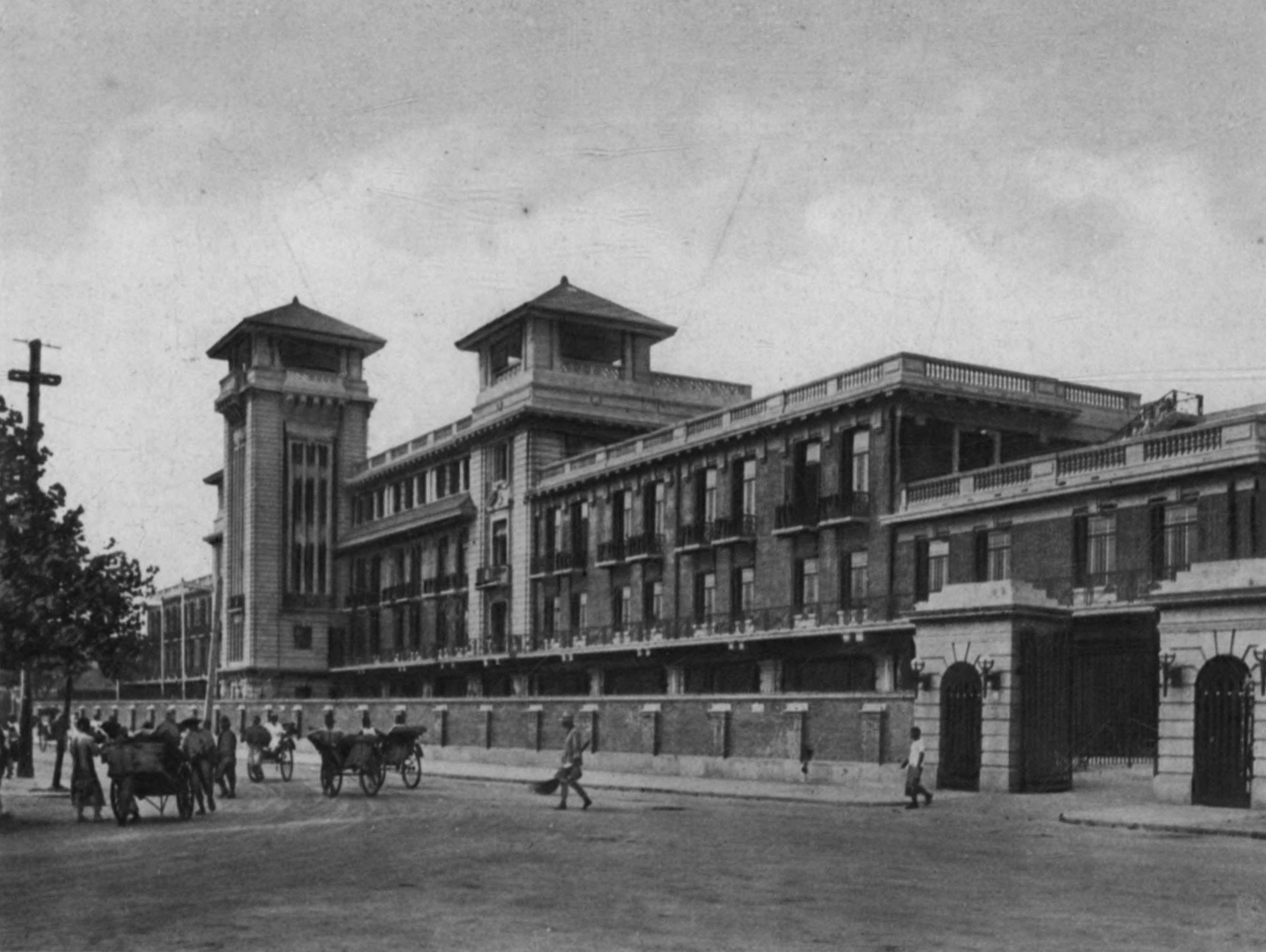
Shanghai Racecourse, stands and administration, 1927

==== Japanese invasion ====
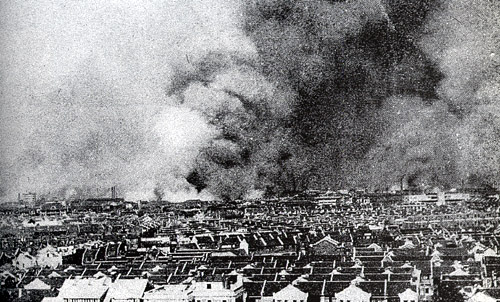
Zhabei District on fire, 1937

On 28 January 1932, Japanese military forces invaded Shanghai. More than 10,000 shops and hundreds of factories and public buildings were destroyed, leaving Zhabei district ruined. About 18,000 civilians were either killed, injured, or declared missing. A ceasefire was brokered on 5 May. In 1937, the Battle of Shanghai resulted in the occupation of the Chinese-administered parts of Shanghai outside of the International Settlement and the French Concession. People who stayed in the occupied city experienced hunger, oppression, or death. The foreign concessions were occupied by the Japanese on 8 December 1941 and remained occupied until Japan's surrender in 1945.

Many Jewish people arrived in Shanghai during the Japanese occupation period. A vice-consul for Japan in Lithuania, Chiune Sugihara, issued thousands of visas to Jewish refugees escaping the Holocaust, and the Japanese government transferred many of them to Shanghai by November 1941. Other Jewish refugees travelled from Italy. The refugees from Europe were interned in the Shanghai Ghetto in Hongkou District after the Japanese attack on Pearl Harbor. After the surrender of Japan, the Chinese Army liberated the Ghetto, and most of the Jews left over the next few years.

=== People's Republic era ===
On 27 May 1949, the People's Liberation Army took control of Shanghai through the Shanghai Campaign. Under the new People's Republic of China (PRC), Shanghai was one of only three municipalities not merged into neighboring provinces (the others being Beijing and Tianjin). Most foreign firms moved their offices from Shanghai to Hong Kong, as part of a foreign divestment due to the PRC's victory.

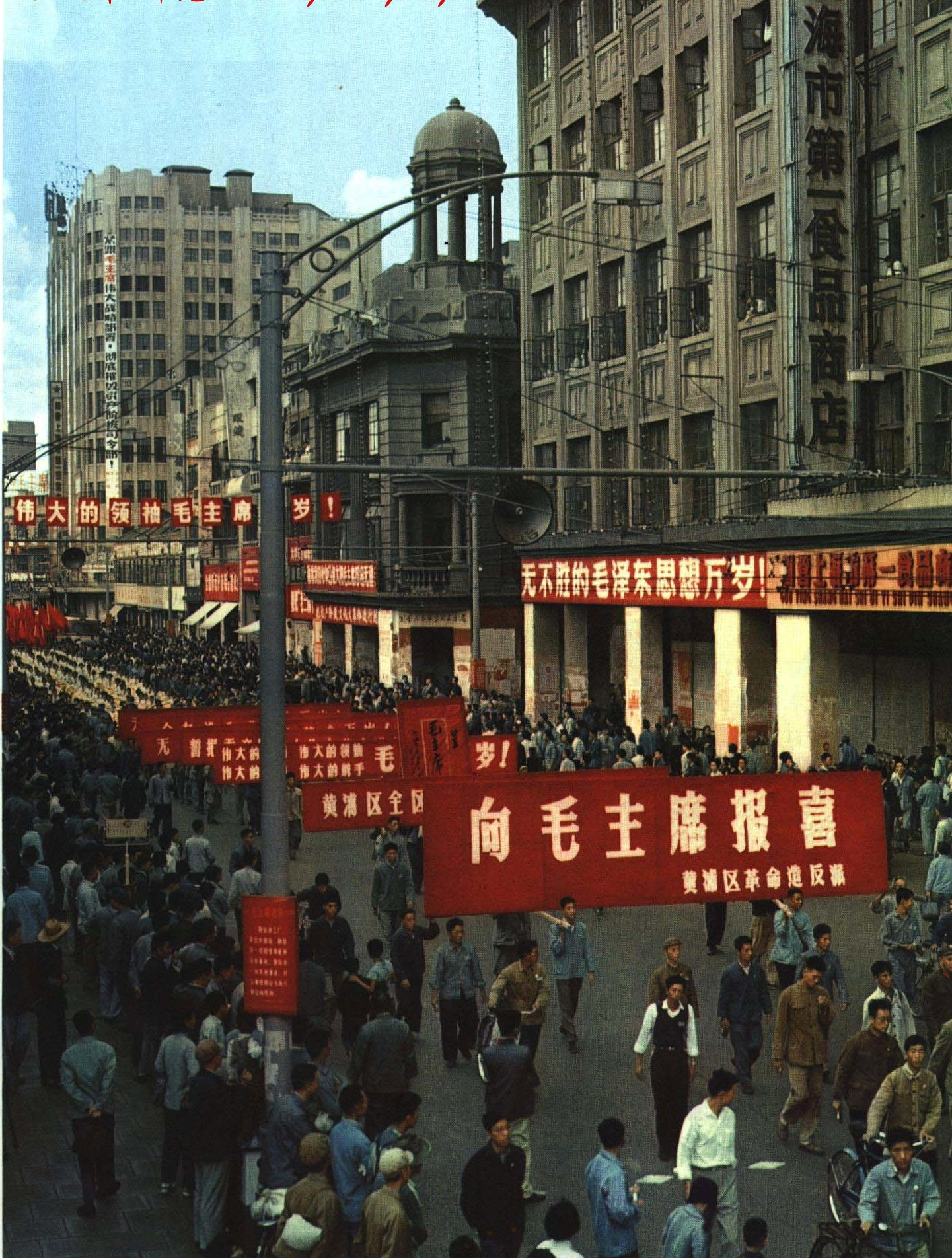
Nanjing Road, 1967, during the Cultural Revolution

After the war, Shanghai's economy was restored. From 1949 to 1952, the city's agricultural and industrial output increased by 51.5% and 94.2%, respectively. As the industrial centre of China with the most skilled industrial workers, Shanghai became a centre for radical leftism during the 1950s and 1960s. During the Cultural Revolution (1966–1976), Shanghai's society was severely damaged. The majority of the workers in the Shanghai branch of the People's Bank of China were Red Guards, and they formed a group called the Anti-Economy Liaison Headquarters within the branch. The Anti-Economy Liaison Headquarters dismantled economic organizations in Shanghai, investigated bank withdrawals, and disrupted regular bank service in the city. Despite the disruptions of the Cultural Revolution, Shanghai maintained economic production with a positive annual growth rate.

In 1990, Deng Xiaoping permitted Shanghai to initiate economic reforms, which reintroduced foreign capital to the city and developed the Pudong district, resulting in the birth of Lujiazui. That year, China's central government designated Shanghai as the "Dragon Head" of the reform and opening up. In 2022, Shanghai experienced a large outbreak of COVID-19 cases and the Chinese government locked down the entire city on 5 April. This resulted in widespread food shortages across the city as food-supply chains were severely disrupted. These restrictions were lifted on 1 June.

== Geography ==
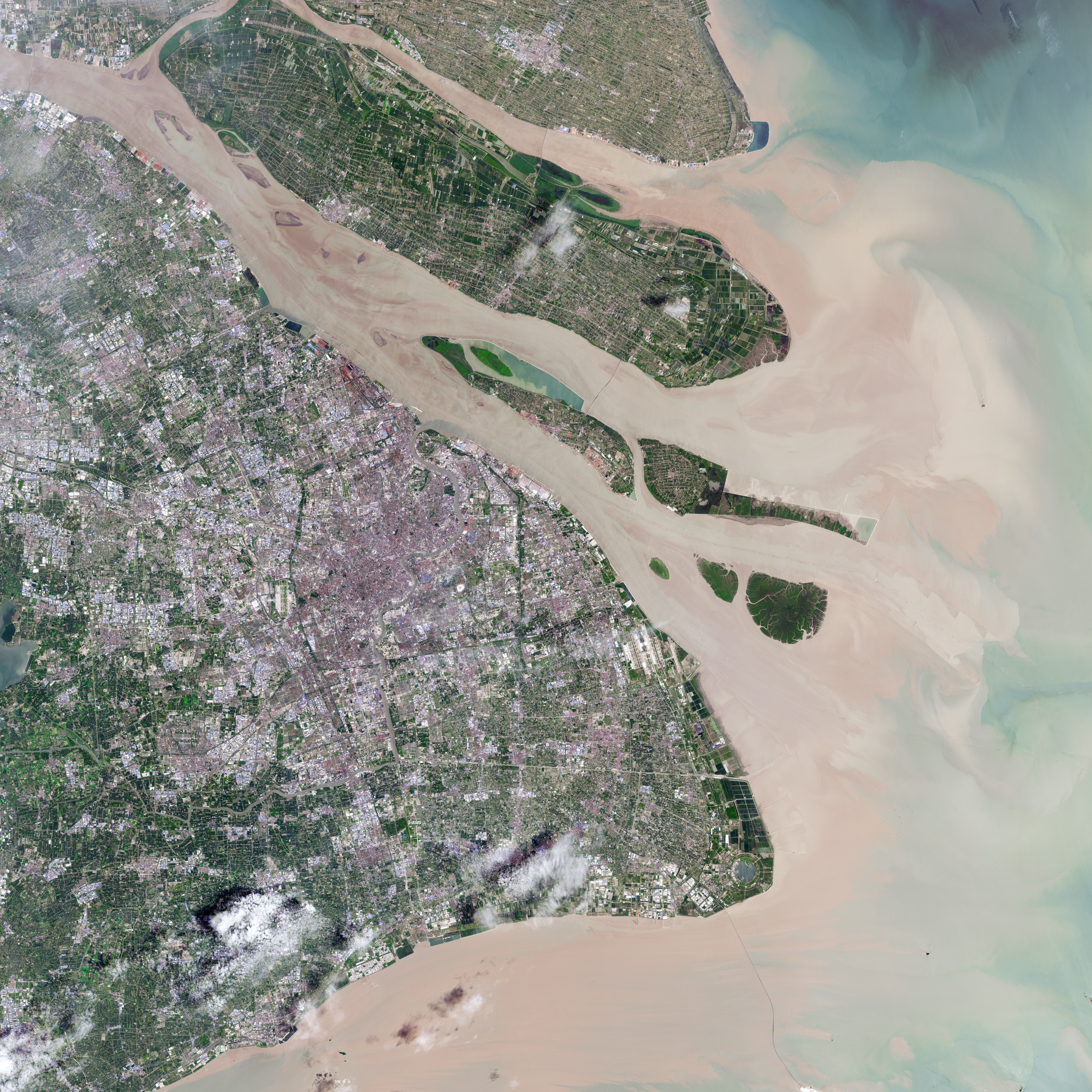
The urban area of Shanghai in 2016, along with its major islands. From northwest to southeast: Chongming, Changxing, Hengsha, and the Jiuduansha shoals off Pudong. The Yangtze's natural sediment discharge can be seen.

Shanghai is located on the Yangtze Estuary of China's east coast, with the Yangtze River to the north, Hangzhou Bay to the south, and the East China Sea to the east. The land is formed by the Yangtze's natural deposition and modern land reclamation projects. It has sandy soil, and skyscrapers have to be built with deep concrete piles to avoid sinking into the soft ground. The provincial-level Municipality of Shanghai administers the estuary and many of its surrounding islands. It borders the provinces of Zhejiang to the south and Jiangsu to the west and north. The municipality's northernmost point is on Chongming Island, the second-largest island in mainland China after its expansion during the 20th century.

Shanghai is located on an alluvial plain and the vast majority of its 6,340.5-square-kilometre (2,448.1-square-mile) land area is flat, with an average elevation of four metres (13 feet). Tidal flat ecosystems exist around the estuary, but they have been reclaimed for agricultural purposes. The city's few hills, such as She Shan, lie to the southwest; its highest point is the peak of Dajinshan Island (103 metres or 338 feet) in Hangzhou Bay. Shanghai has rivers, canals, streams, and lakes, and it is known for its rich water resources as part of the Lake Tai drainage basin.

Shanghai

Climate chart (precipitation, max. and min. temperature)
J	F	M	A	M	J	J	A	S	O	N	D
72 8 1	65 10 3	97 14 6	84 20 12	91 25 17	225 28 22	163 33 26	226 32 25	132 28 21	70 23 16	61 17 10	50 11 3
- █ Average max. and min. temperatures in °C
- █ Precipitation totals in mm
- Source: The National Centers for Environmental Information (NCEI)
Imperial conversion
J	F	M	A	M	J	J	A	S	O	N	D
2.8 46 34	2.6 50 37	3.8 57 43	3.3 68 54	3.6 77 63	8.9 82 72	6.4 91 79	8.9 90 77	5.2 82 70	2.8 73 61	2.4 63 50	2 52 37
- █ Average max. and min. temperatures in °F
- █ Precipitation totals in inches

Downtown Shanghai is bisected by the Huangpu River, a man-made tributary of the Yangtze created by order of Lord Chunshen during the Warring States period. The historic centre of the city was located on the west bank of the Huangpu (Puxi), near the mouth of Suzhou Creek, connecting it with Lake Tai and the Grand Canal. The central financial district, Lujiazui, was established on the east bank of the Huangpu (Pudong). Along Shanghai's eastern shore, the destruction of local wetlands due to the construction of Pudong International Airport has been partially offset by the protection and expansion of a nearby shoal, Jiuduansha, as a nature preserve.

=== Climate ===
Shanghai has a humid subtropical climate (Köppen: Cfa), with an average annual temperature of 17.5 °C (63.5 °F) for downtown areas and 16.2–17.2 °C (61.2–63.0 °F) for suburbs. The city experiences four distinct seasons. Winters are temperate to cold and damp—northwesterly winds from Siberia can cause nighttime temperatures to drop below freezing. Each year, there are an average of 4.7 days with snowfall and 1.6 days with snow cover. Summers are hot and humid, and occasional downpours or thunderstorms can be expected. On average, 21 days meet or exceed 35 °C (95 °F) annually. In summer and the beginning of autumn, the city is susceptible to typhoons.

The most pleasant seasons are generally spring, although changeable and often rainy, and autumn, which is usually sunny and dry. With monthly percent possible sunshine ranging from 28% in June to 46% in August, the city receives 1,754 hours of bright sunshine annually. According to China's seasonal division standard, from 2001 to 2025, Shanghai enters spring on 9 March, summer on 15 May, autumn on 5 October, and winter on 4 December. The average temperature for the three weeks from 19 July to 8 August is above 30 °C (86.0 °F). Extremes since 1951 have ranged from −10.1 °C (13.8 °F) on 31 January 1977 (unofficial record of −12.1 °C (10.2 °F) was set on 19 January 1893) to 40.9 °C (105.6 °F) on 21 July 2017 and 13 July 2022 at a weather station in Xujiahui. It also has 32.1 °C (89.8 °F) as the highest ever daily minimum temperature at Xujiahui on 13 August 2010.

In 2025, the average temperature of Xujiahui was 19.43 °C (67.0 °F), which was 1.93 °C higher than the average from 1991 to 2020. The average daily high temperature is 23.66 °C (74.6 °F), and the average daily low temperature is 16.44 °C (61.6 °F).

Climate data for Shanghai (Xujiahui), elevation 5 m (16 ft), (1991–2020 normals, extremes 1951–present)
Month	Jan	Feb	Mar	Apr	May	Jun	Jul	Aug	Sep	Oct	Nov	Dec	Year
Record high °C (°F)	21.6 (70.9)	27.0 (80.6)	31.1 (88.0)	33.9 (93.0)	36.7 (98.1)	38.5 (101.3)	40.9 (105.6)	40.8 (105.4)	38.2 (100.8)	36.0 (96.8)	28.5 (83.3)	23.4 (74.1)	40.9 (105.6)
Mean maximum °C (°F)	16.2 (61.2)	20.3 (68.5)	24.9 (76.8)	29.5 (85.1)	32.7 (90.9)	34.6 (94.3)	38.0 (100.4)	37.8 (100.0)	34.2 (93.6)	29.6 (85.3)	24.3 (75.7)	18.2 (64.8)	38.5 (101.3)
Mean daily maximum °C (°F)	8.7 (47.7)	10.7 (51.3)	14.9 (58.8)	20.9 (69.6)	25.8 (78.4)	28.6 (83.5)	33.2 (91.8)	32.6 (90.7)	28.7 (83.7)	23.5 (74.3)	17.8 (64.0)	11.3 (52.3)	21.4 (70.5)
Daily mean °C (°F)	5.4 (41.7)	7.0 (44.6)	10.7 (51.3)	16.1 (61.0)	21.3 (70.3)	24.7 (76.5)	29.1 (84.4)	28.8 (83.8)	25.1 (77.2)	19.9 (67.8)	14.3 (57.7)	7.9 (46.2)	17.5 (63.5)
Mean daily minimum °C (°F)	2.9 (37.2)	4.1 (39.4)	7.6 (45.7)	12.6 (54.7)	17.9 (64.2)	22.0 (71.6)	26.2 (79.2)	26.2 (79.2)	22.5 (72.5)	17.1 (62.8)	11.4 (52.5)	5.3 (41.5)	14.7 (58.4)
Mean minimum °C (°F)	−3.2 (26.2)	−1.6 (29.1)	1.9 (35.4)	7.1 (44.8)	12.5 (54.5)	17.6 (63.7)	22.3 (72.1)	22.8 (73.0)	18.2 (64.8)	11.8 (53.2)	4.9 (40.8)	−1.3 (29.7)	−4.5 (23.9)
Record low °C (°F)	−10.1 (13.8)	−7.9 (17.8)	−5.4 (22.3)	−0.5 (31.1)	6.9 (44.4)	12.3 (54.1)	16.3 (61.3)	18.8 (65.8)	10.8 (51.4)	1.7 (35.1)	−4.2 (24.4)	−8.5 (16.7)	−10.1 (13.8)
Average precipitation mm (inches)	72.2 (2.84)	65.0 (2.56)	97.3 (3.83)	84.2 (3.31)	91.0 (3.58)	224.9 (8.85)	163.2 (6.43)	225.9 (8.89)	131.5 (5.18)	69.6 (2.74)	61.4 (2.42)	50.4 (1.98)	1,336.6 (52.61)
Average precipitation days (≥ 0.1 mm)	10.6	10.4	12.7	11.3	11.2	14.3	12.2	12.7	10.1	7.5	9.2	8.5	130.7
Average snowy days	2.1	1.8	0.5	0.0	0.0	0.0	0.0	0.0	0.0	0.0	0.1	0.9	5.4
Average relative humidity (%)	71	71	70	69	70	79	76	76	74	70	71	69	72
Average dew point °C (°F)	0.6 (33.1)	2.1 (35.8)	5.5 (41.9)	10.4 (50.7)	15.6 (60.1)	20.8 (69.4)	24.4 (75.9)	24.1 (75.4)	20.1 (68.2)	14.3 (57.7)	9.1 (48.4)	2.6 (36.7)	12.5 (54.4)
Mean monthly sunshine hours	114.3	119.9	128.5	148.5	169.8	130.9	190.8	185.7	167.5	161.4	131.1	127.4	1,775.8
Source: China Meteorological Administration (sun 1981–2010) all-time extreme temperature

Climate data for Minhang District, elevation 6 m (20 ft), (1991–2020 normals, extremes 1951–present)
Month	Jan	Feb	Mar	Apr	May	Jun	Jul	Aug	Sep	Oct	Nov	Dec	Year
Record high °C (°F)	24.0 (75.2)	27.2 (81.0)	31.5 (88.7)	33.3 (91.9)	37.5 (99.5)	37.9 (100.2)	40.8 (105.4)	40.9 (105.6)	37.4 (99.3)	35.4 (95.7)	29.7 (85.5)	23.9 (75.0)	40.9 (105.6)
Mean daily maximum °C (°F)	8.7 (47.7)	10.7 (51.3)	14.8 (58.6)	20.6 (69.1)	25.5 (77.9)	28.3 (82.9)	32.8 (91.0)	32.3 (90.1)	28.5 (83.3)	23.6 (74.5)	17.9 (64.2)	11.5 (52.7)	21.3 (70.3)
Daily mean °C (°F)	4.9 (40.8)	6.6 (43.9)	10.4 (50.7)	15.8 (60.4)	20.9 (69.6)	24.4 (75.9)	28.8 (83.8)	28.5 (83.3)	24.7 (76.5)	19.5 (67.1)	13.7 (56.7)	7.3 (45.1)	17.1 (62.8)
Mean daily minimum °C (°F)	1.9 (35.4)	3.3 (37.9)	6.8 (44.2)	11.9 (53.4)	17.2 (63.0)	21.5 (70.7)	25.8 (78.4)	25.7 (78.3)	21.6 (70.9)	15.9 (60.6)	10.1 (50.2)	3.9 (39.0)	13.8 (56.8)
Record low °C (°F)	−11.0 (12.2)	−8.5 (16.7)	−5.2 (22.6)	−0.6 (30.9)	6.0 (42.8)	12.4 (54.3)	16.6 (61.9)	18.5 (65.3)	10.3 (50.5)	2.3 (36.1)	−4.7 (23.5)	−8.8 (16.2)	−11.0 (12.2)
Average precipitation mm (inches)	70.4 (2.77)	65.4 (2.57)	95.4 (3.76)	82.5 (3.25)	93.2 (3.67)	207.3 (8.16)	148.0 (5.83)	187.1 (7.37)	118.1 (4.65)	68.4 (2.69)	59.4 (2.34)	50.3 (1.98)	1,245.5 (49.04)
Average precipitation days (≥ 0.1 mm)	10.9	10.2	12.9	11.3	11.2	14.5	11.7	12.4	9.8	7.4	9.1	8.3	129.7
Average snowy days	1.8	1.4	0.4	0.0	0.0	0.0	0.0	0.0	0.0	0.0	0.1	0.7	4.4
Average relative humidity (%)	74	73	72	71	73	80	78	78	76	73	74	72	75
Mean monthly sunshine hours	114.8	117.9	143.8	168.1	176.8	131.2	209.4	202.3	163.7	162.1	131.1	129.7	1,850.9
Percentage possible sunshine	36	37	39	43	41	31	49	50	45	46	42	41	42
Source: China Meteorological Administration

Climate data for Baoshan District, elevation 6 m (20 ft), (1991–2020 normals, extremes 1951–present)
Month	Jan	Feb	Mar	Apr	May	Jun	Jul	Aug	Sep	Oct	Nov	Dec	Year
Record high °C (°F)	23.0 (73.4)	27.0 (80.6)	33.1 (91.6)	34.3 (93.7)	36.4 (97.5)	37.5 (99.5)	39.7 (103.5)	40.0 (104.0)	38.2 (100.8)	36.7 (98.1)	29.2 (84.6)	24.4 (75.9)	40.0 (104.0)
Mean daily maximum °C (°F)	8.2 (46.8)	10.1 (50.2)	14.3 (57.7)	20.1 (68.2)	25.1 (77.2)	27.8 (82.0)	32.4 (90.3)	31.9 (89.4)	27.9 (82.2)	22.9 (73.2)	17.5 (63.5)	11.0 (51.8)	20.8 (69.4)
Daily mean °C (°F)	4.9 (40.8)	6.5 (43.7)	10.3 (50.5)	15.7 (60.3)	20.9 (69.6)	24.4 (75.9)	28.8 (83.8)	28.5 (83.3)	24.7 (76.5)	19.7 (67.5)	13.9 (57.0)	7.5 (45.5)	17.2 (62.9)
Mean daily minimum °C (°F)	2.2 (36.0)	3.6 (38.5)	6.9 (44.4)	12.0 (53.6)	17.5 (63.5)	21.7 (71.1)	25.9 (78.6)	25.9 (78.6)	22.2 (72.0)	16.7 (62.1)	10.7 (51.3)	4.4 (39.9)	14.1 (57.5)
Record low °C (°F)	−10.1 (13.8)	−7.9 (17.8)	−5.4 (22.3)	−0.5 (31.1)	6.9 (44.4)	12.3 (54.1)	16.3 (61.3)	18.3 (64.9)	10.8 (51.4)	1.7 (35.1)	−4.2 (24.4)	−8.5 (16.7)	−10.1 (13.8)
Average precipitation mm (inches)	69.8 (2.75)	64.0 (2.52)	86.5 (3.41)	77.1 (3.04)	90.2 (3.55)	196.7 (7.74)	146.9 (5.78)	210.1 (8.27)	116.5 (4.59)	71.4 (2.81)	57.5 (2.26)	49.3 (1.94)	1,236 (48.66)
Average precipitation days (≥ 0.1 mm)	10.0	9.7	12.2	10.6	10.8	13.7	11.9	12.5	9.9	7.0	8.6	8.1	125
Average snowy days	1.9	1.4	0.4	0.1	0.0	0.0	0.0	0.0	0.0	0.0	0.1	0.7	4.6
Average relative humidity (%)	73	73	72	70	71	79	76	77	75	71	72	71	73
Mean monthly sunshine hours	110.4	115.4	136.6	157.0	169.7	120.7	184.7	186.5	161.2	157.6	127.1	127.1	1,754
Percentage possible sunshine	34	37	37	40	40	28	43	46	44	45	40	41	40
Source: China Meteorological Administration

== Cityscape ==
The Bund, located by the bank of the Huangpu River, is home to a row of early 20th-century architecture, ranging in style from the neoclassical HSBC Building to the Art Deco Sassoon House (now part of the Peace Hotel). The area has been revitalized several times: the first was in 1986, with a new promenade by the Dutch architect Paulus Snoeren. The second was before the 2010 Expo, which includes restoration of the century-old Waibaidu Bridge and reconfiguration of traffic flow.

Shanghai's construction boom during the 1920s and 1930s caused the city to have several Art Deco buildings. László Hudec, a Hungarian-Slovak who lived in the city between 1918 and 1947, designed Art Deco buildings such as the Park Hotel, the Grand Cinema, and the Paramount. Other prominent Art Deco-style architects are Clement Palmer and Arthur Turner, who designed the Peace Hotel, the Metropole Hotel, and the Broadway Mansions; and Austrian architect C.H. Gonda, who designed the Capitol Theatre. One common architectural element is the shikumen (石库门; 石庫門; Wugniu: zaq-khu-men, "stone storage door") residence, typically two- or three-story gray brick houses with the front yard protected by a heavy wooden door in a stylistic stone arch. Each residence is connected and arranged in straight alleys known as longtangs (弄堂; lon-daon). Shanghai also has Soviet neoclassical architecture or Stalinist architecture: most were erected between the founding of the People's Republic in 1949 and the Sino-Soviet Split in the late 1960s when Soviet personnel came to China to aid in the development of a communist state. An example of Soviet neoclassical architecture in Shanghai is the Shanghai Exhibition Center.

Shanghai has 206 buildings 150m+ making it the seventh city in the world with the most skyscrapers. Some of Shanghai's skyscrapers include the Jin Mao Tower, the Shanghai World Financial Center, and the Shanghai Tower, which was completed in 2015 and is currently the tallest building in China and the third tallest in the world. The Oriental Pearl Tower, at 468 m (1,535 ft), is located nearby at the northern tip of Lujiazui. Many areas in the former foreign concessions are well-preserved. Despite rampant redevelopment, the Old City retains traditional architecture and designs, such as the Yu Garden, an elaborate Jiangnan style garden.

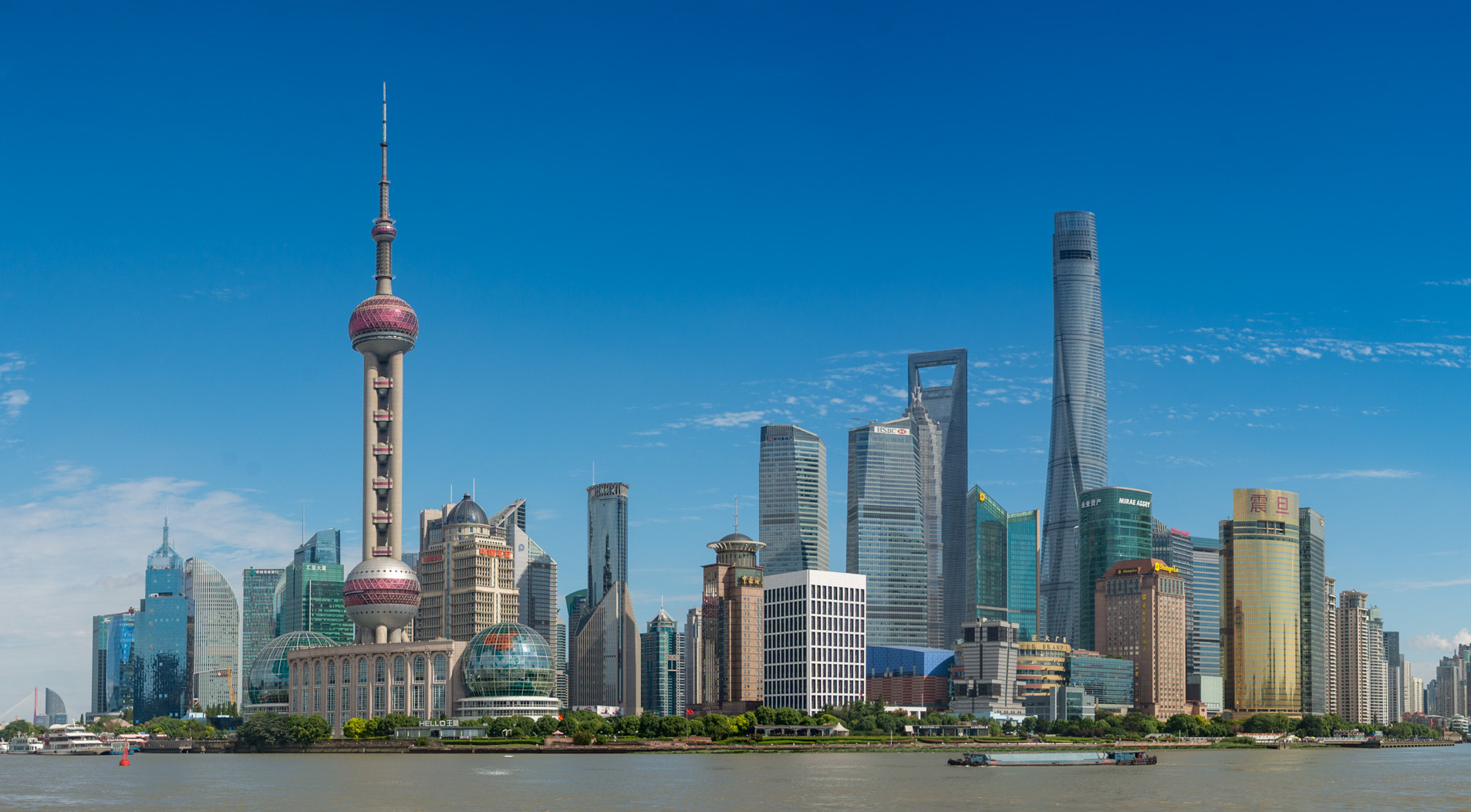
View of skyscrapers in Lujiazui from The Bund

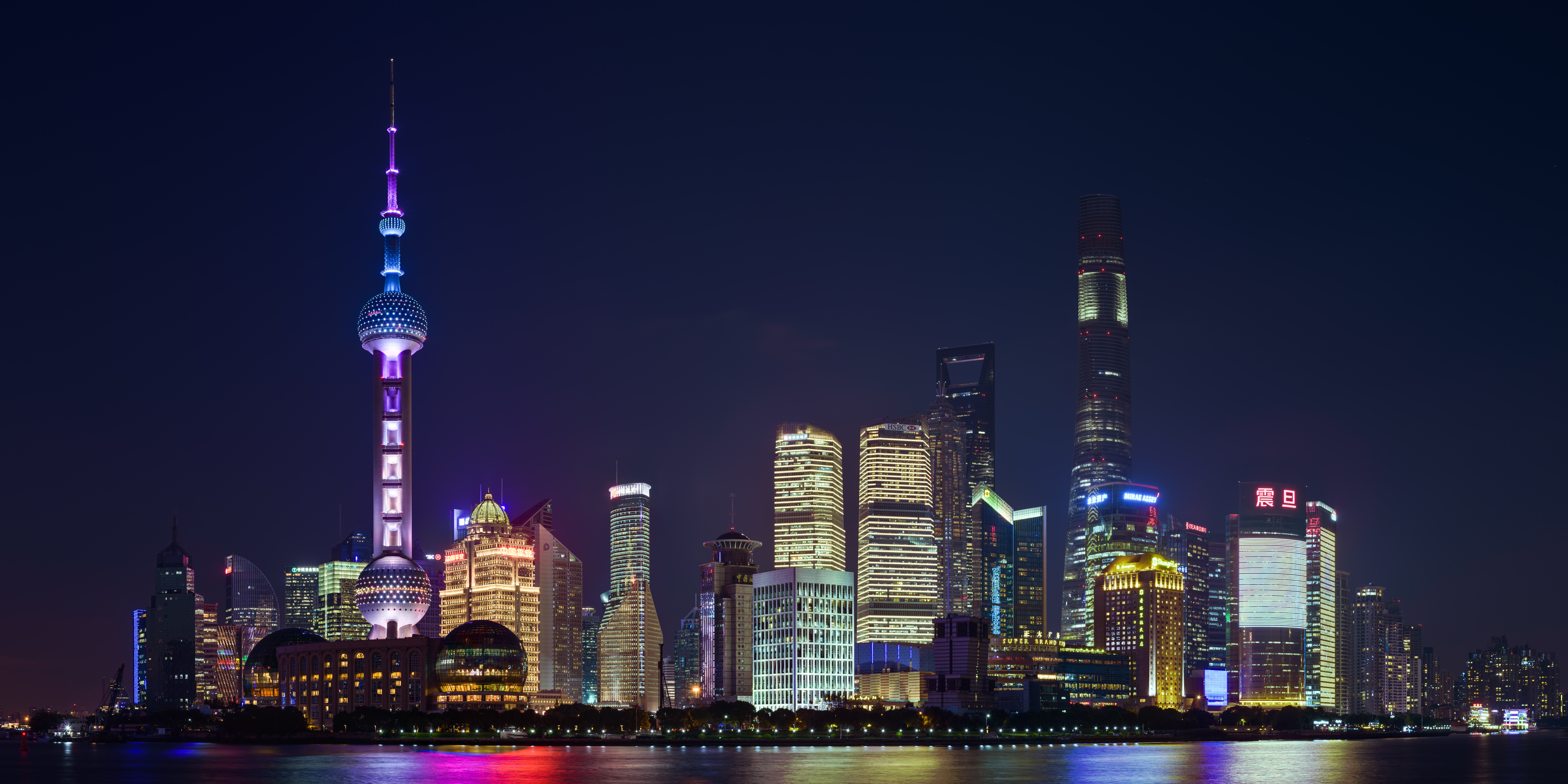
Night view of skyscrapers in Lujiazui from The Bund

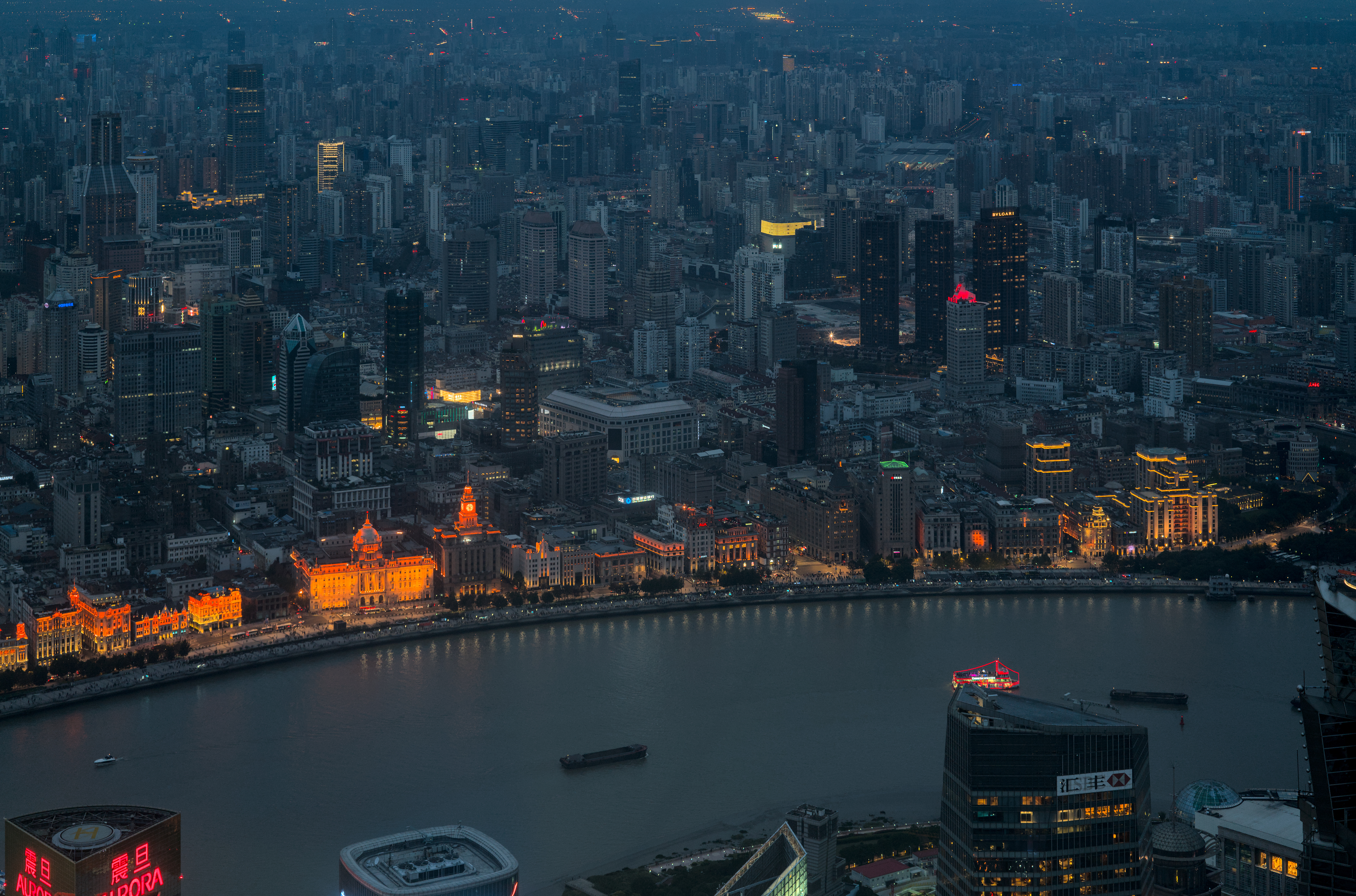
Blue hour view of the Bund from the Shanghai World Financial Center

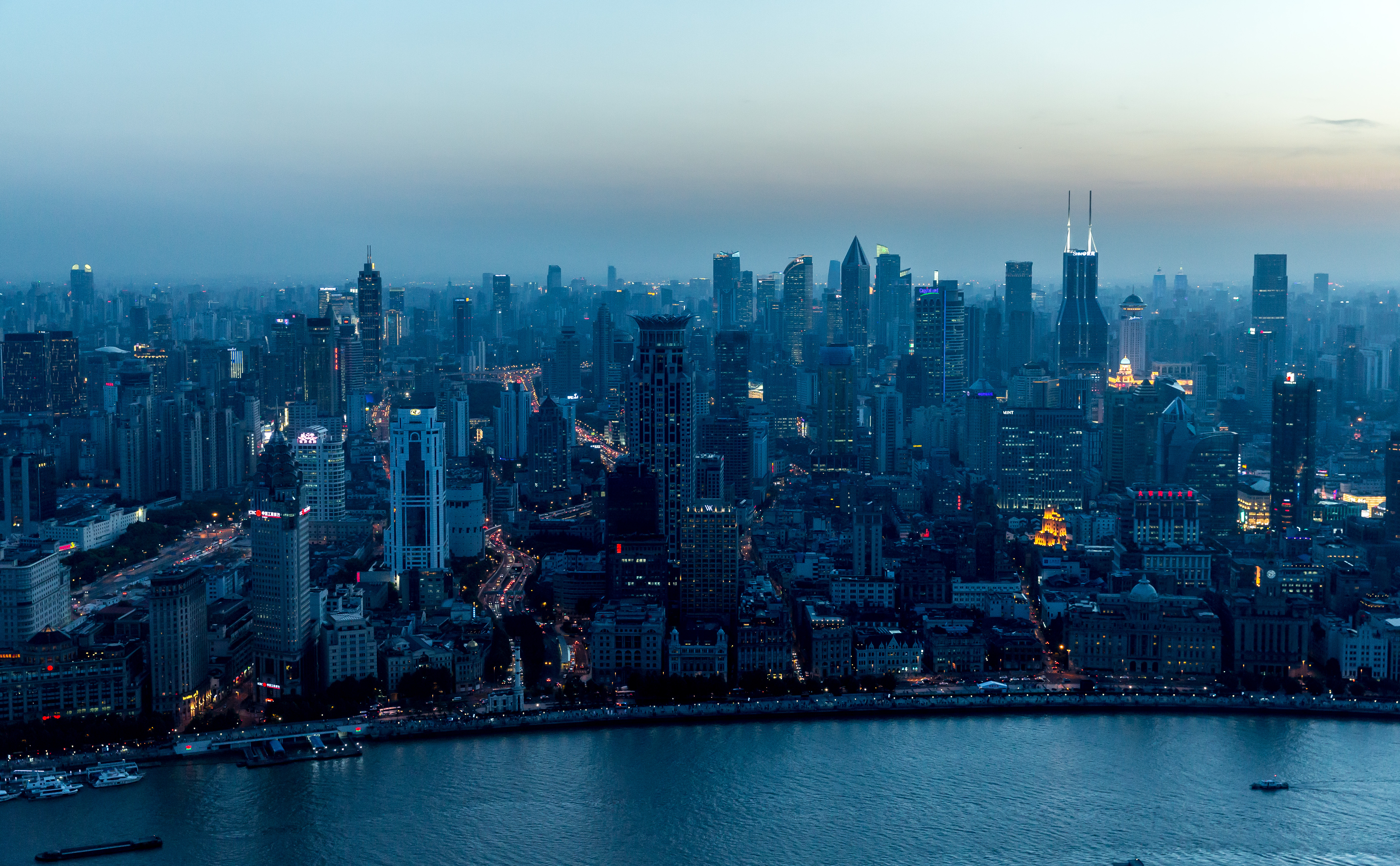
Blue hour view over Huangpu

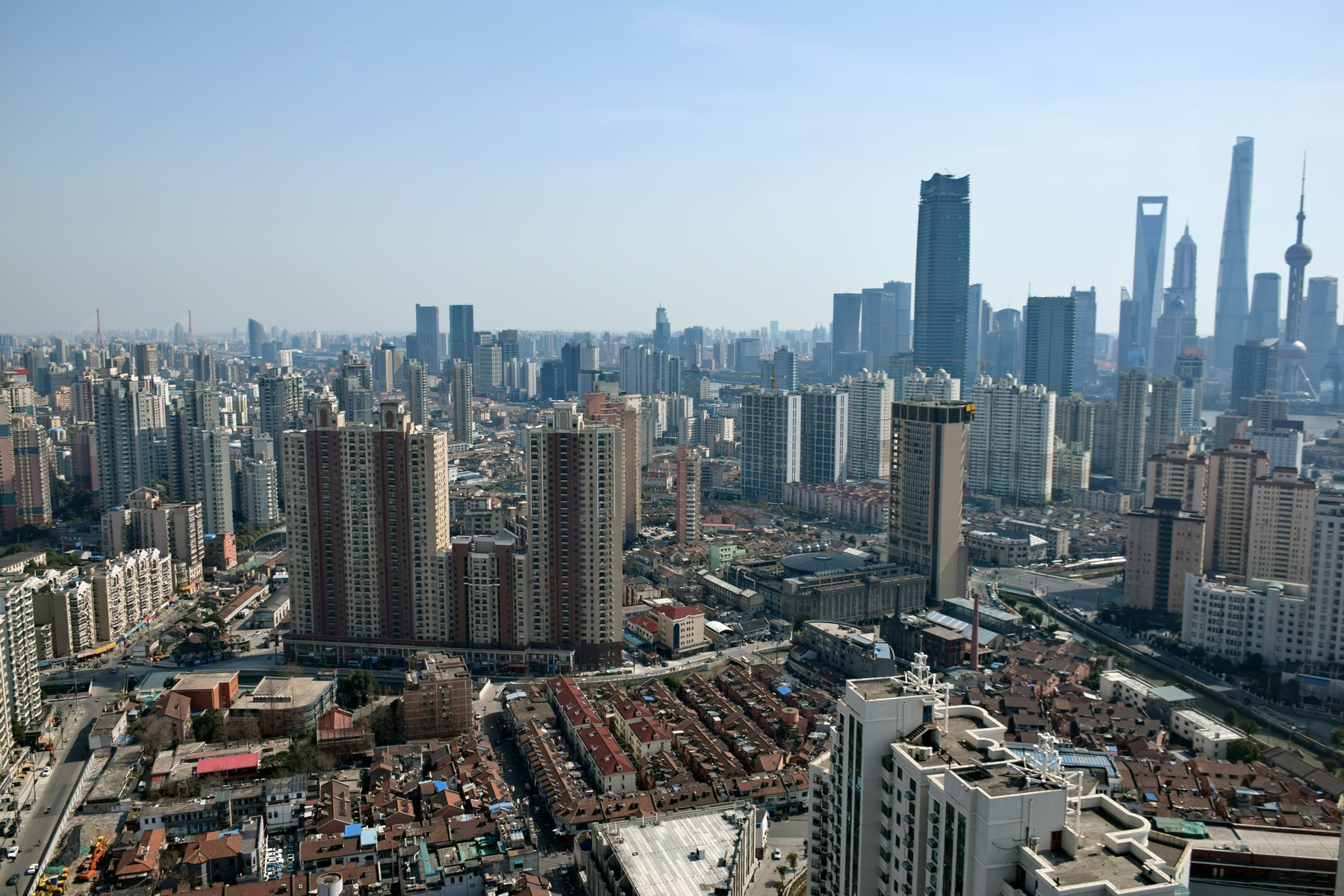
Aerial view of Hongkou District

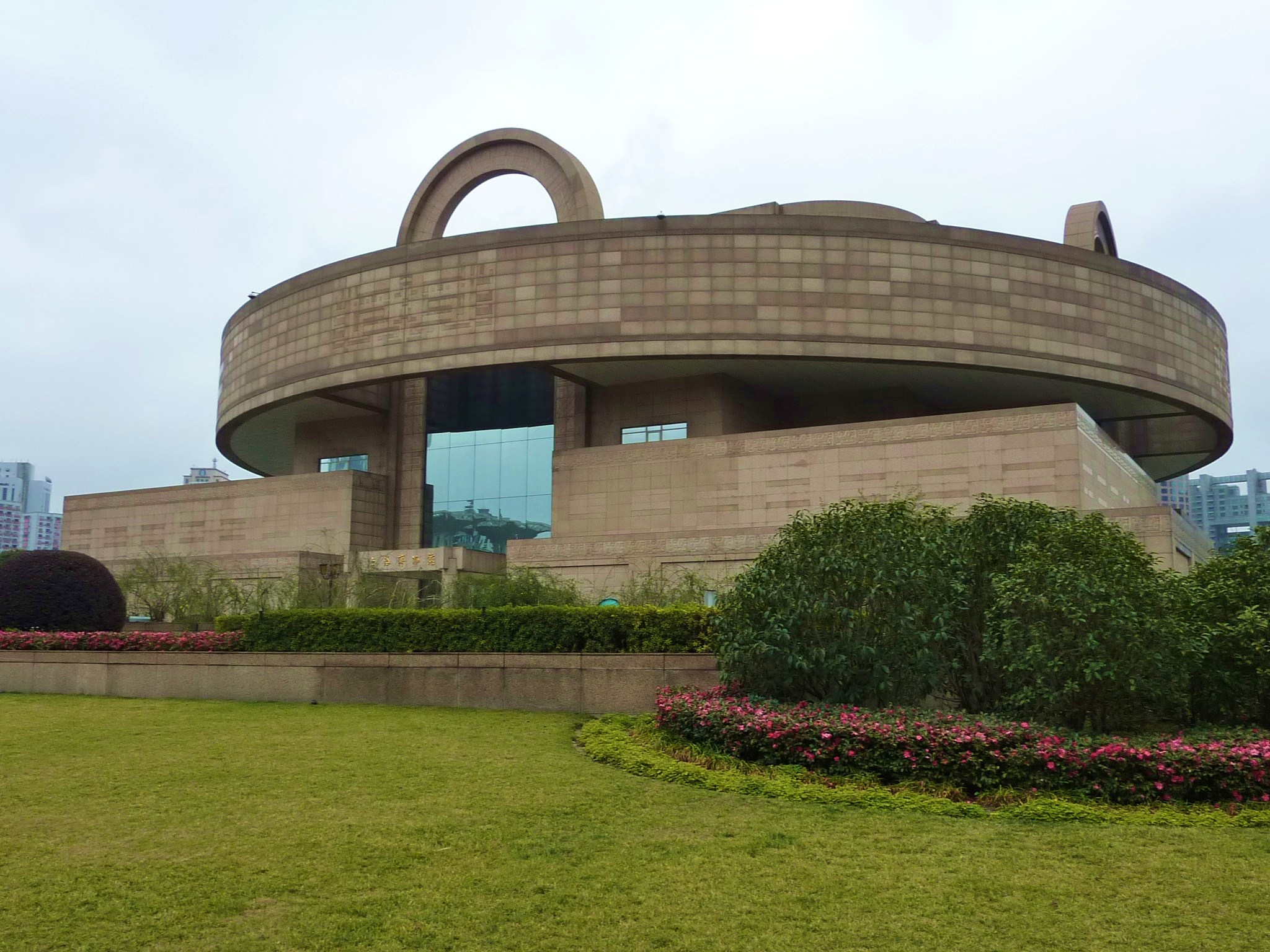
The Shanghai Museum

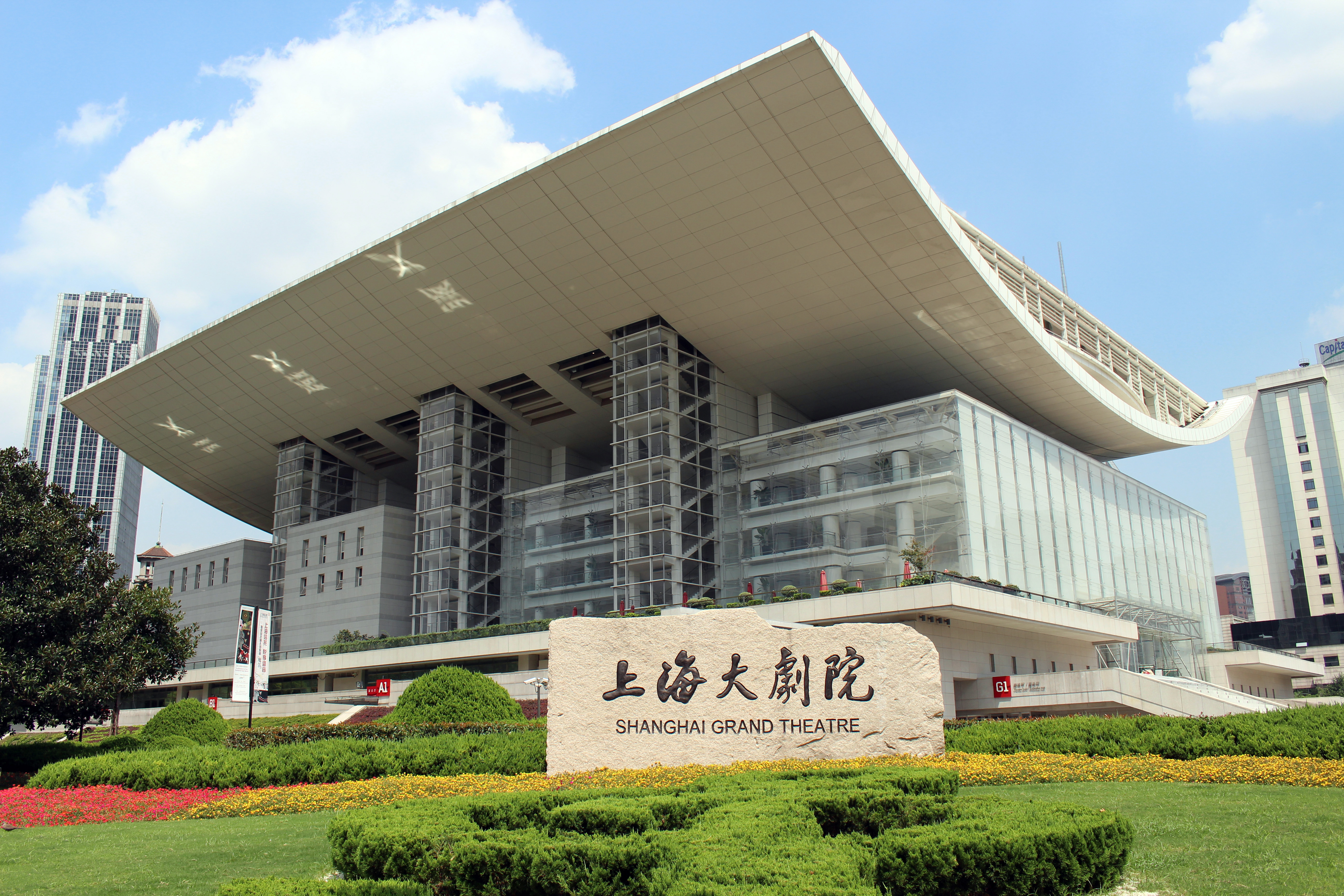
The Shanghai Grand Theater

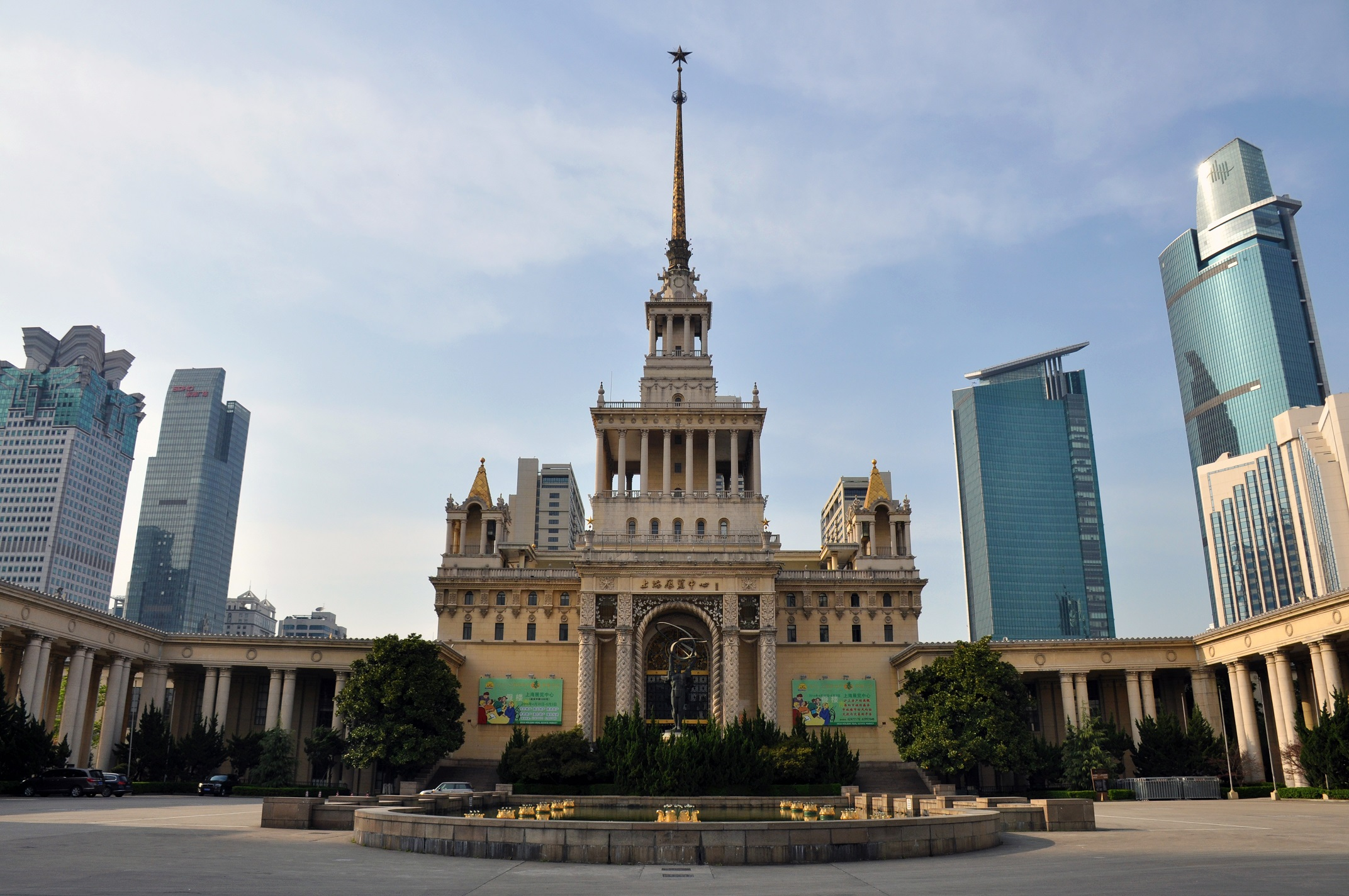
The Shanghai Exhibition Center, an example of Stalinist architecture

== Politics ==
=== Structure ===
Current leaders of the Shanghai Municipal Government
Title	CCP Committee Secretary	SMPC Chairwoman	Mayor	Shanghai CPPCC Chairman
Name	Chen Jining	Huang Lixin	Zhu Zhongming	Hu Wenrong
Ancestral home	Lishu, Jilin	Suqian, Jiangsu	Haining, Zhejiang	Putian, Fujian
Born	February 1964 (age 62)	August 1962 (age 64)	April 1972 (age 54)	July 1964 (age 62)
Assumed office	October 2022	January 2024	September 2026	January 2023

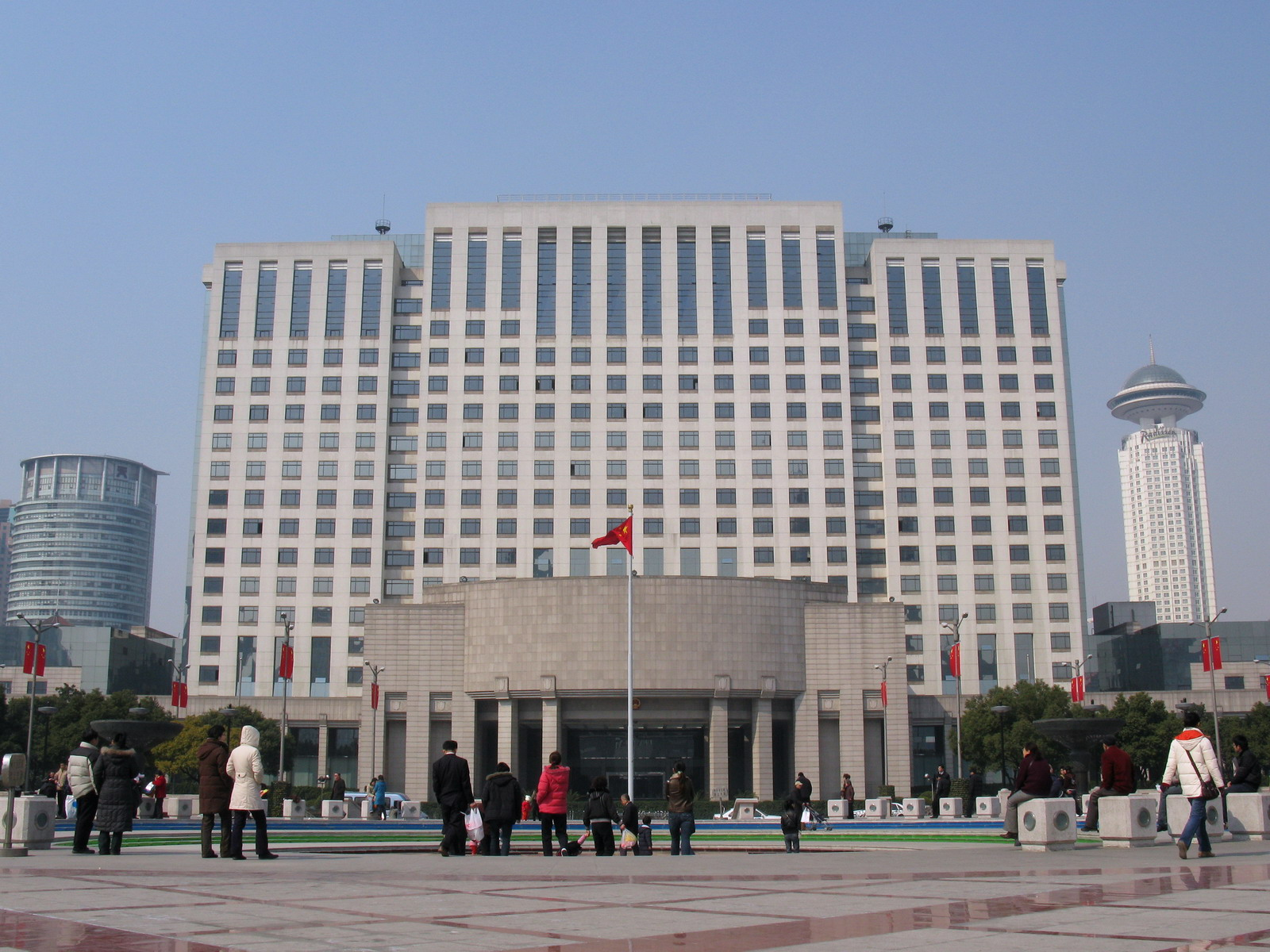
Shanghai Municipal Government building

Like all governing institutions in mainland China, Shanghai has a parallel party-government system, in which the CCP Committee Secretary, officially termed the Chinese Communist Party Shanghai Municipal Committee Secretary, outranks the Mayor. The CCP committee acts as the top policy-formulation body, and typically composed of 12 members (including the secretary); it has control over the Shanghai Municipal People's Government.

Political power in Shanghai has been a stepping stone to higher positions in the central government. Since Jiang Zemin became the General Secretary of the Chinese Communist Party in June 1989, several former Shanghai party secretaries and deputy party secretaries were elevated to the Politburo Standing Committee, the de facto highest decision-making body in China. Officials with ties to the Shanghai administration collectively form a powerful faction in the central government known as the Shanghai Clique, which has often been viewed as competing against the rival Youth League Faction over personnel appointments and policy decisions.

=== Administrative divisions ===
Shanghai is one of the four municipalities under the direct administration of the Central People's Government, and is divided into 16 districts. These are further divided to 108 subdistricts, 106 towns and 2 townships.

When the Shanghai Municipal People's Government was founded in 1949, the land area governed was 663.5 square kilometres (256.2 sq mi), largely located within the present-day Outer Ring Expressway. In 1958, ten counties were reassigned under Shanghai from Jiangsu. District reorganizations saw several counties in the suburbs become districts between 1988 and 2015, and Chongming was the last county to be retitled as a district in 2015.

Shanghai also administers several enclaves in Jiangsu and Anhui provinces. Local residents hold Shanghai household registration and enjoy benefits identical to Shanghai residents.

Administrative divisions of Shanghai
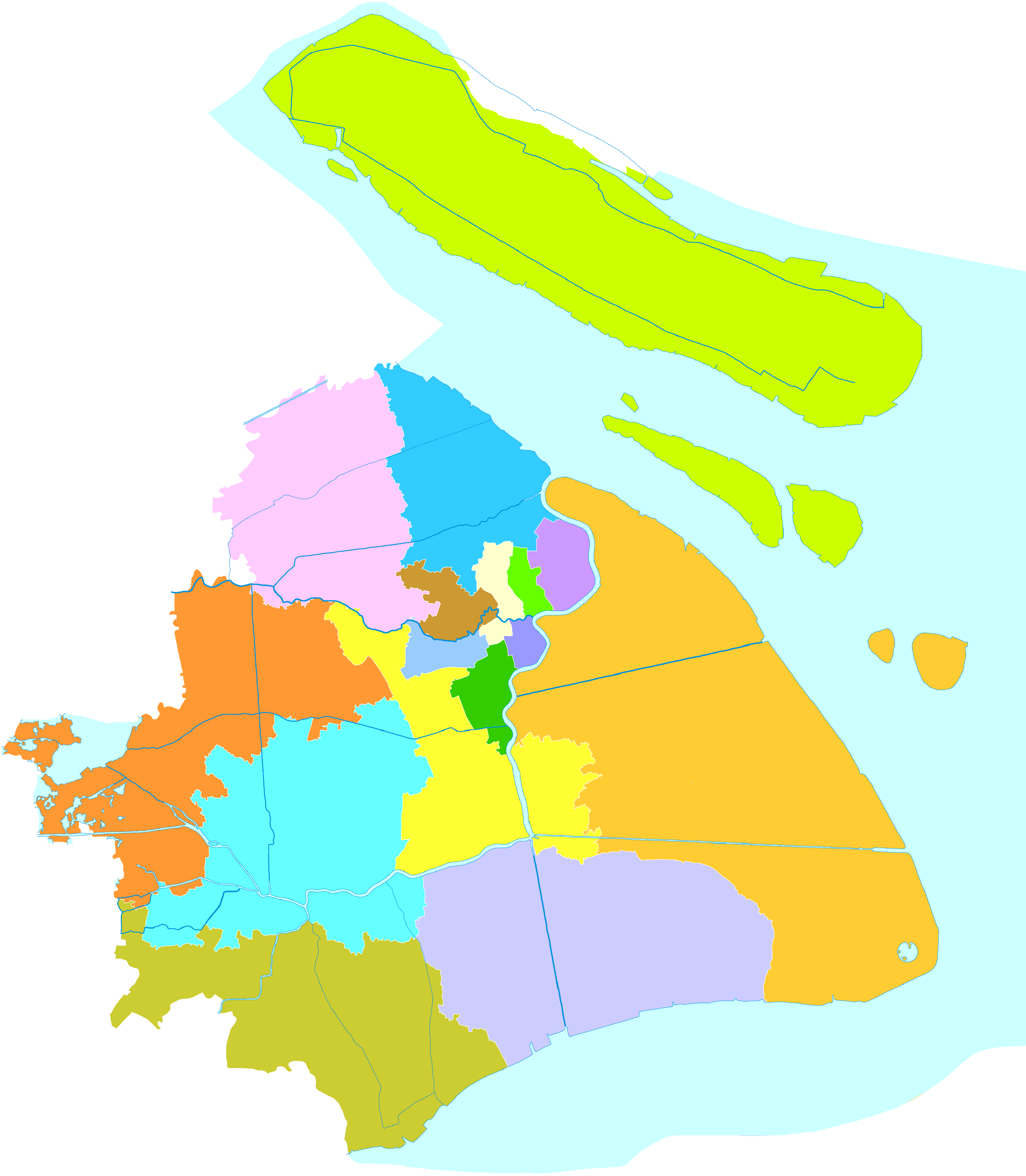

Notes: 1 Huangpu, 2 Xuhui, 3 Jing'an, 4 Putuo, 5 Hongkou, 6 Yangpu, 7 Changning

Division code	Division	Area (km^{2})	Total population 2022	Seat	Postal code
310000	Shanghai	6,340.50	24,758,900	Huangpu	200000
310101	Huangpu	20.46	507,800	Waitan Subdistrict	200001
310104	Xuhui	54.76	1,098,500	Xujiahui Subdistrict	200030
310105	Changning	38.30	684,600	Jiangsu Road Subdistrict	200050
310106	Jing'an	36.88	940,500	Jiangning Road Subdistrict	200040
310107	Putuo	54.83	1,242,900	Zhenru Town Subdistrict	200333
310109	Hongkou	23.48	681,900	Jiaxing Road Subdistrict	200080
310110	Yangpu	60.73	1,199,200	Pingliang Road Subdistrict	200082
310112	Minhang	370.75	2,688,800	Xinzhuang town	201100
310113	Baoshan	270.99	2,271,900	Youyi Road Subdistrict	201900
310114	Jiading	464.20	1,893,400	Xincheng Road Subdistrict	201800
310115	Pudong	1,210.41	5,782,000	Huamu Subdistrict	200135
310116	Jinshan	586.05	822,600	Jinshanwei Town	201500

== Economy ==
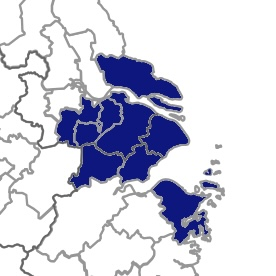
Greater Shanghai Metropolitan Area

City	Area km^{2}	Population (2020)	GDP (CN¥)	GDP (US$)
Shanghai	6,341	26,875,500	CN¥ 4,465 billion	US$663.9 billion
Suzhou	8,488	12,748,252	CN¥ 2,396 billion	US$356.0 billion
Ningbo	9,816	9,618,000	CN¥ 1,570 billion	US$233.5 billion
Wuxi	4,628	7,462,135	CN¥ 1,485 billion	US$221.0 billion
Nantong	8,544	7,726,635	CN¥ 1,138 billion	US$169.2 billion
Changzhou	4,385	5,278,121	CN¥ 955 billion	US$142.0 billion
Jiaxing	4,009	5,400,868	CN¥ 551 billion	US$73.6 billion
Huzhou	5,818	3,367,579	CN¥ 272 billion	US$40.7 billion
Zhoushan	1,378	1,157,817	CN¥ 151 billion	US$20.0 billion
Greater Shanghai Metropolitan Area	53,407	79,634,907	CN¥ 12.983 trillion	US$1.927 trillion

The city is a global centre for finance and innovation, and a national centre for commerce, trade, and transportation, with the world's busiest container port—the Port of Shanghai. As of 2022, the Greater Shanghai metropolitan area, which includes Suzhou, Wuxi, Nantong, Ningbo, Jiaxing, Zhoushan, and Huzhou, was estimated to produce a gross metropolitan product (nominal) of nearly 13 trillion RMB ($1.9 trillion). As of 2020, the economy of Shanghai was estimated to be $1 trillion (PPP), ranking the most productive metro area of China and among the top ten largest metropolitan economies in the world. Shanghai's six largest industries—retail, finance, IT, real estate, machine manufacturing, and automotive manufacturing—comprise about half the city's GDP.

As of 2025, Shanghai had a GDP of CN¥5.67 trillion ($814 billion in nominal; $1.66 trillion in PPP) that makes up 4% of China's GDP, and a GDP per capita of CN¥228,280 (US$32,840 in nominal; US$66,944 in PPP). In 2022, the average annual disposable income of Shanghai's residents was CN¥79,610 (US$11,836) per capita, while the average annual salary of people employed in urban units in Shanghai was CN¥212,476 (US$31,589), making it one of the wealthiest cities in China, but also the most expensive city in mainland China to live in according to a 2023 study by the Economist Intelligence Unit. According to Julius Baer's Global Wealth and Lifestyle Report, Shanghai was the most expensive city in the world for living a luxurious lifestyle in 2021.

In 2023, the city's imports and exports reached CN¥7.73 trillion (US$1.07 trillion), accounting for 18.5% of the national total. In 2022, Shanghai was ranked fifth-highest in the number of billionaires by Forbes. Shanghai's nominal GDP was projected to reach US$1.3 trillion in 2035 (ranking first in China), making it one of the world's top 5 major cities in terms of GRP according to a study by Oxford Economics. As of August 2024, Shanghai ranked 4th in the world and 2nd in Greater China (after Beijing) by the largest number of the Fortune Global 500 companies.

Economy of Shanghai since the reform and opening up
Year	1978	1980	1983	1986	1990	1993	1996	2000	2003	2006	2010	2013	2016	2017	2018	2019
GDP (¥T)	0.027	0.031	0.035	0.049	0.078	0.152	0.298	0.481	0.676	1.072	1.744	2.226	2.818	3.063	3.268	3.816
GDP per capita (¥K)	2.85	2.73	2.95	3.96	5.91	11.06	20.81	30.31	38.88	55.62	77.28	92.85	116.58	126.63	134.83	157.14
Average disposable income (urban) (¥K)		0.64			2.18	4.28	8.16	11.72	14.87	20.67	31.84	43.85	57.69	62.60	64.18 (total)	69.44 (total)
Average disposable income (rural) (¥K)		0.40			1.67		4.85	5.57	6.66	9.21	13.75	19.21	25.52	27.82	64.18 (total)	69.44 (total)

In the last two decades, Shanghai has been one of the fastest-developing cities in the world; it has recorded double-digit GDP growth in almost every year between 1992 and 2008, before the 2008 financial crisis.

=== Finance ===
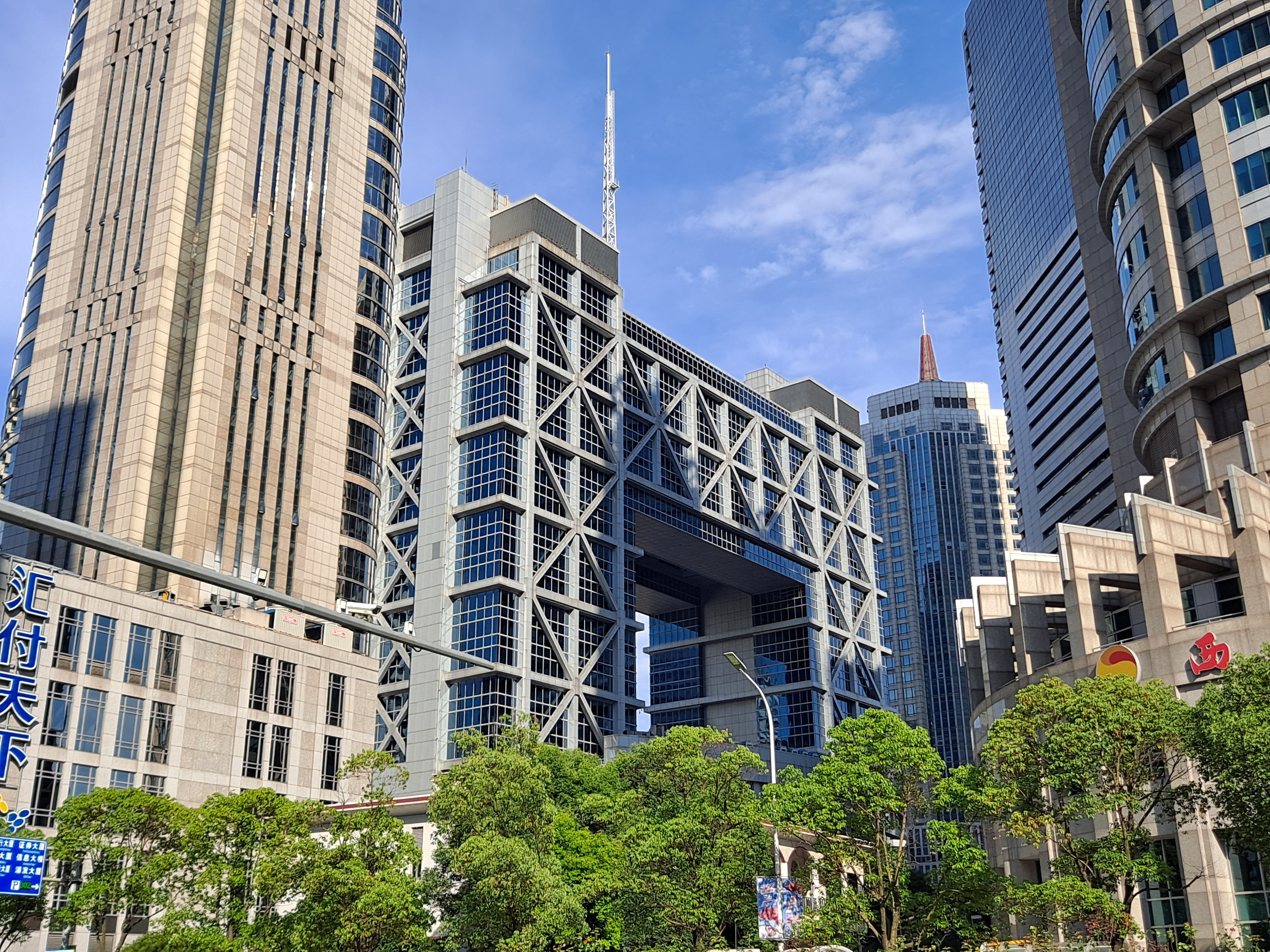
The Shanghai Stock Exchange is one of the largest stock exchanges in the world by market capitalization.

Shanghai is a global financial center, ranking third in Asia and eighth globally on the Global Financial Centres Index. Shanghai is also a large hub of the Chinese and global technology industry and home to a large startup ecosystem. As of 2021, the city was ranked as the 2nd Fintech powerhouse in the world after New York City.

As of 2019, the Shanghai Stock Exchange had a market capitalization of US$4.02 trillion, making it the largest stock exchange in China and the fourth-largest stock exchange in the world. In 2009, the trading volume of six key commodities—including rubber, copper, and zinc—on the Shanghai Futures Exchange all ranked first globally. By the end of 2017, Shanghai had 1,491 financial institutions, of which 251 were foreign-invested.

=== Manufacturing ===
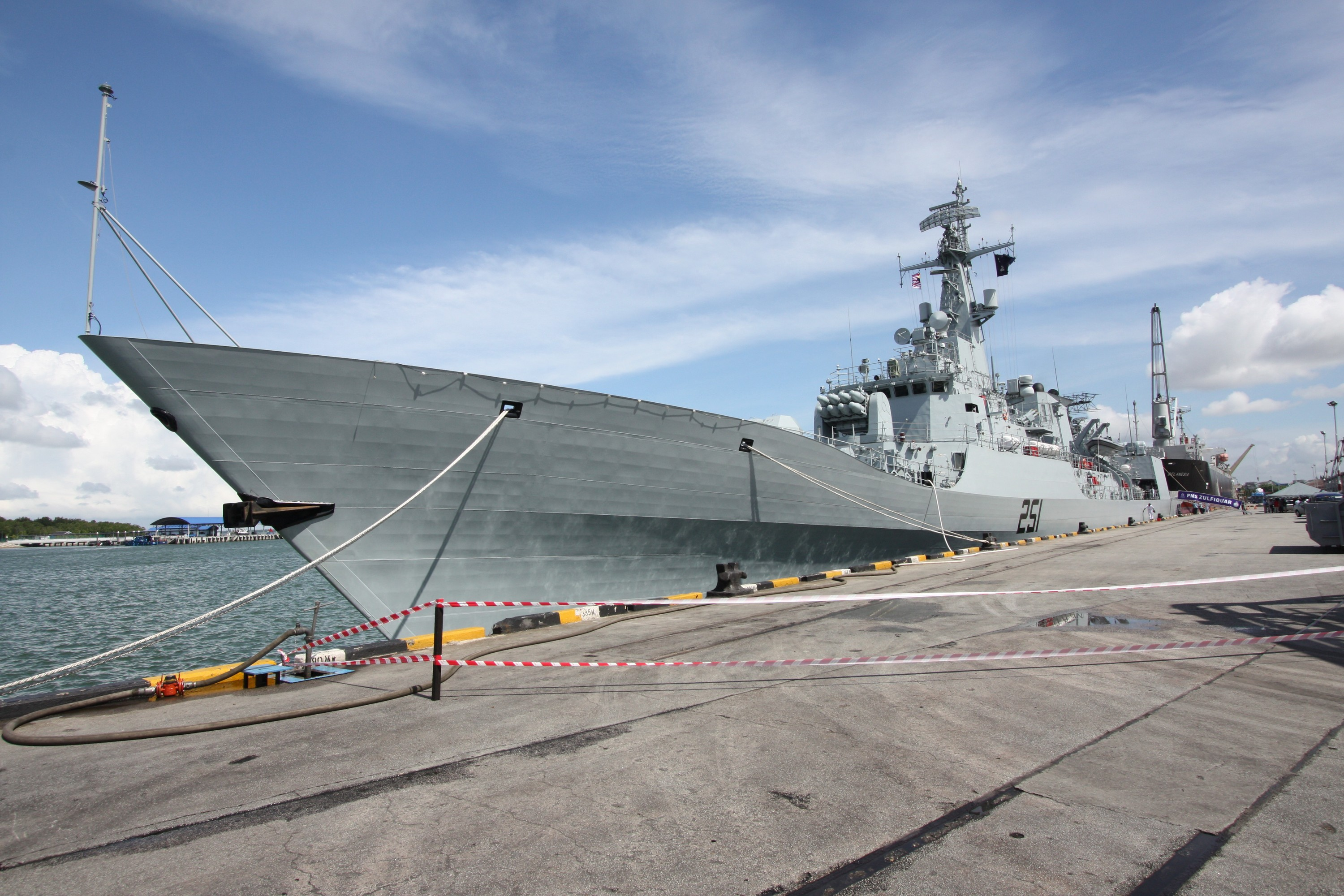
The F-22P frigate built by Hudong-Zhonghua for the Pakistan Navy

As one of the main industrial centres of China, Shanghai plays a key role in domestic manufacturing and heavy industry. Several industrial zones—including Shanghai Hongqiao Economic and Technological Development Zone, Jinqiao Export Economic Processing Zone, Minhang Economic and Technological Development Zone, and Shanghai Caohejing High-Tech Development Zone—are backbones of Shanghai's secondary sector. Shanghai is home to China's largest steelmaker Baosteel Group, China's largest shipbuilding base Hudong–Zhonghua Shipbuilding Group, and one of China's oldest shipbuilders, the Jiangnan Shipyard. In auto manufacturing, the Shanghai-based SAIC Motor is one of the three largest automotive corporations in China, and has strategic partnerships with Volkswagen and General Motors. The company ranked 84 on the Fortune Global 500 list in 2023.

=== Tourism ===
In 2017, the number of domestic tourists to the city increased by 7.5% to 318 million, while the number of overseas tourists increased by 2.2% to 8.73 million. In 2017, Shanghai was the highest earning tourist city in the world. According to the International Congress and Convention Association, Shanghai hosted 82 international meetings in 2018, a 34% increase from 61 in 2017. As of 2023, it had 57 five-star hotels, 52 four star hotels, 1,942 travel agencies, 144 rated tourist attractions, and 34 red tourist attractions. In 2023, Shanghai had 3.64 million tourists, a 4.8-fold growth compared to 2022. It generated CN¥177.12 billion (US$24.53 billion) in value, a 98.5% increase from the previous year. The number of foreign tourists reached 2.41 million, with a 5.2-fold increase.

=== Free-trade zone ===
In September 2013, the city launched the Shanghai Free-Trade Zone—the first free-trade zone in mainland China. It introduced several reforms to incentivize foreign investment. The Banker reported that Shanghai attracted the highest volumes of financial sector foreign direct investment in the Asia-Pacific region in 2013. As of October 2019, it is the second largest free-trade zone in mainland China in terms of land area (behind Hainan Free Trade Zone) covering an area of 240.22 square kilometres (92.75 sq mi) and integrating four existing bonded zones—Waigaoqiao Free Trade Zone, Waigaoqiao Free Trade Logistics Park, Yangshan Free Trade Port Area, and Pudong Airport Comprehensive Free Trade Zone. Commodities entering the zone are exempt from duty and customs clearance.

== Demographics ==
Historical population

Year	Pop.	±%
1953	5,258,210	—
1964	6,423,017	+22.2%
1982	6,320,829	−1.6%
1990	8,348,299	+32.1%

Year	Pop.	±%
2000	14,489,919	+73.6%
2010	20,555,098	+41.9%
2020	22,209,380	+8.0%

Source: Census in China

As of 2023, Shanghai had a population of 24,874,500, including 14,801,700 (59.5%) hukou holders (registered locally). As of 2022, 89.3% of Shanghai's population lives in urban areas, and 10.7% live in rural areas. Based on the population of its total administrative area, Shanghai is the second largest of the four municipalities of China, behind Chongqing, but is generally considered the largest Chinese city because the urban population of Chongqing is much smaller. According to the OECD, Shanghai's metropolitan area has an estimated population of 34 million.

According to the Shanghai Municipal Statistics Bureau, about 157,900 residents in Shanghai are foreigners, including 28,900 Japanese, 21,900 Americans, and 20,800 Koreans. The actual number of foreign citizens in the city is probably much higher. Shanghai is also a domestic immigration city—40.3% (9.8 million) of the city's residents are from other regions of China.

Shanghai has a life expectancy of 83.18 years for the city's registered population, the highest life expectancy of all cities in mainland China. This has also caused the city to experience population aging—in 2021, 17.4% (4.3 million) of the city's registered population was aged 65 or above. In 2017, the Chinese government implemented population controls for Shanghai, resulting in a population decline of 10,000 people by the end of the year.

=== Religion ===
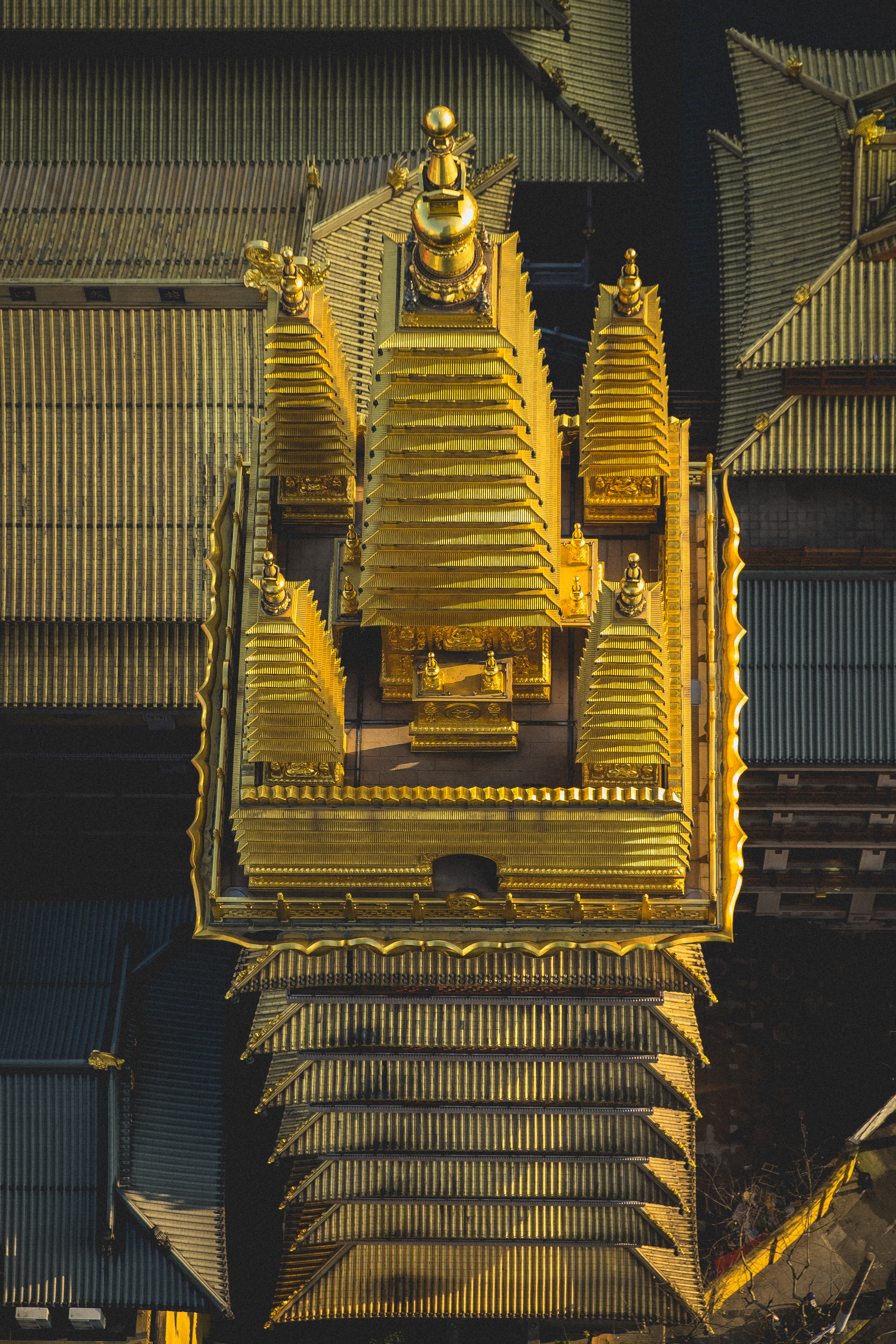
Bird's-eye view of the golden pagoda of Jing'an Temple

Due to its cosmopolitan history, Shanghai has a blend of religious heritage; religious buildings and institutions are scattered around the city. According to a 2012 survey, 13.1% of the city's population belongs to organised religions, including Buddhists with 10.4%, Protestants with 1.9%, Catholics with 0.7%, and other faiths with 0.1%. The remaining 86.9% of the population could be either atheists or involved in worship of nature deities and ancestors or folk religious sects.

Religion in Shanghai (2012):
1. Chinese folk religion, or atheist (87.5%)
2. Buddhism (10.3%)
3. Christianity (1.88%)
4. Islam (0.36%)

Buddhism, in its Chinese varieties, has had a presence in Shanghai since the Three Kingdoms period, during which the Longhua Temple—the largest temple in Shanghai—and the Jing'an Temple were founded. As of 2014, Buddhism in Shanghai had 114 temples, 1,182 clergical staff, and 453,300 registered followers. The religion also has its own college, the Shanghai Buddhist College, and its own press, Shanghai Buddhological Press.

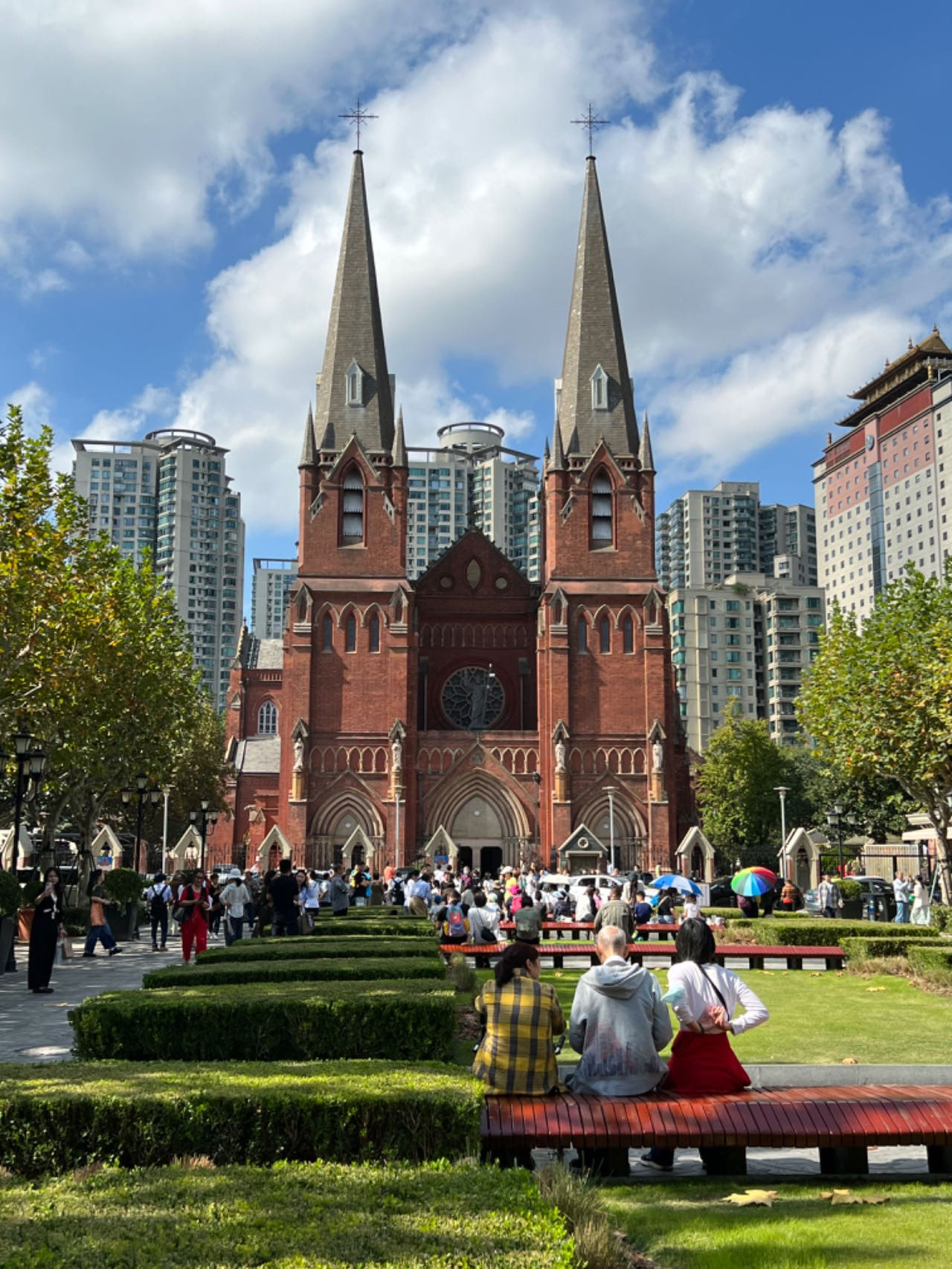
The St. Ignatius Cathedral

Catholicism was brought into Shanghai in 1608 by Italian missionary Lazzaro Cattaneo. The Apostolic Vicariate of Shanghai was erected in 1933, and was further elevated to the Diocese of Shanghai in 1946. The St. Ignatius Cathedral in Xujiahui is the largest Catholic church in the city. Shanghai has the highest concentration of urban Catholics in China. Other forms of Christianity in Shanghai include Eastern Orthodox minorities and, since 1996, registered Christian Protestant churches. The Protestant All Saints Church in Huangpu was built in 1925 and features a Neo-Romanesque tower.

Prominent Jewish families immigrated to Shanghai when the Treaty of Nanking opened the city to Western populations. During World War II, thousands of Jews emigrated to Shanghai to flee Nazi Germany. They lived in a designated area called the Shanghai Ghetto and formed a community centred on the Ohel Moishe Synagogue, (now the Shanghai Jewish Refugees Museum). In 1939, Horace Kadoorie, the head of the powerful philanthropic Sephardic Jewish family in Shanghai, founded the Shanghai Jewish Youth Association to support Jewish refugees through English education so they would be prepared to emigrate from Shanghai.

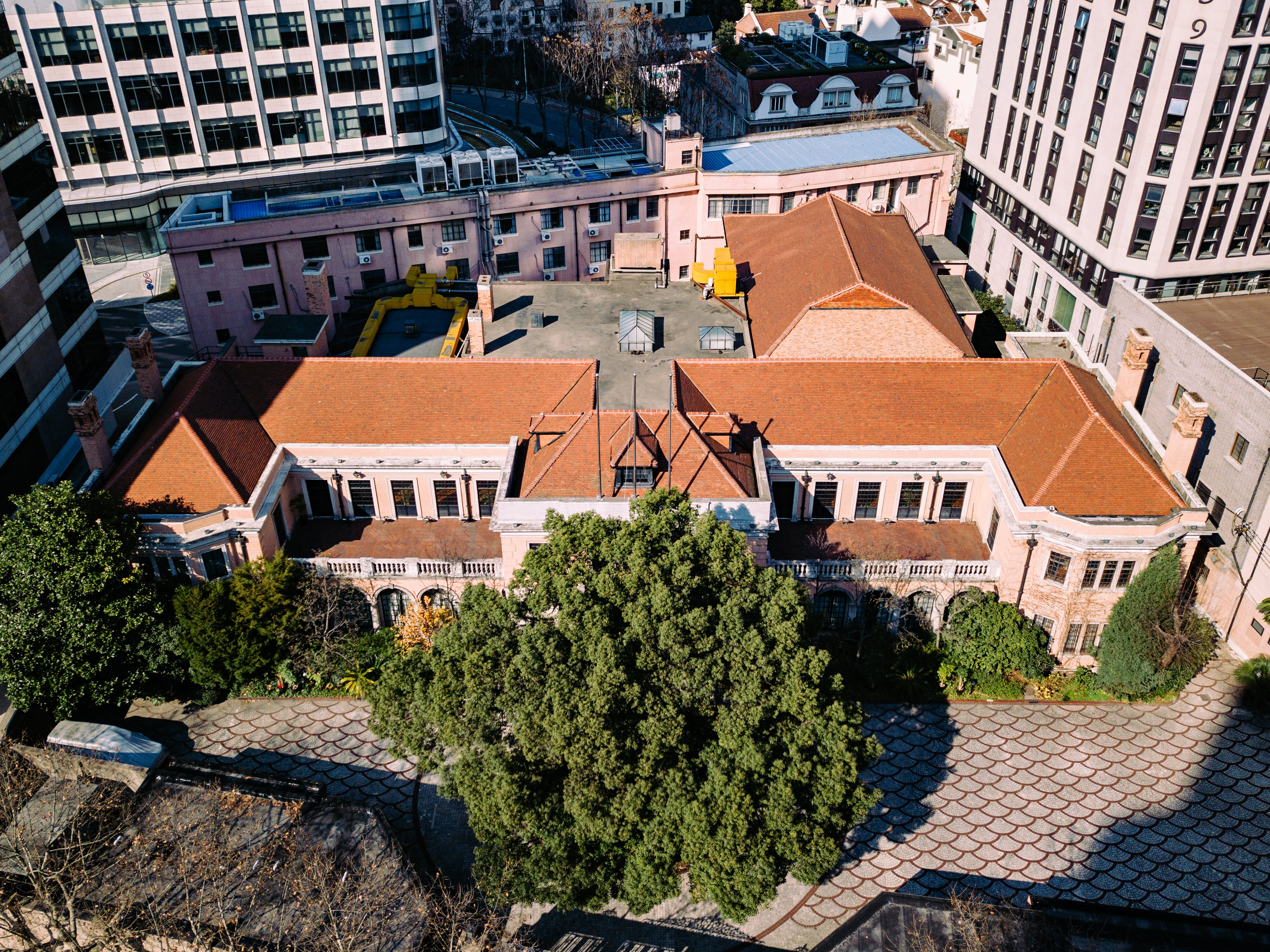
The former Shanghai Jewish Club at 722 West Nanjing Road, a European Renaissance Revival mansion originally built for Chinese merchant Ye Yiquan and later used by the Jewish community as a social club.

Islam came into Shanghai during the Yuan dynasty. The city's first mosque, Songjiang Mosque, was built during the Zhizheng (至正) era under Emperor Huizong (reigned 1333 – 1368). Shanghai's Muslim population increased in the 19th and early 20th centuries (when the city was a treaty port), during which time many mosques—including the Xiaotaoyuan Mosque, the Huxi Mosque, and the Pudong Mosque—were built. The Shanghai Islamic Association is located in the Xiaotaoyuan Mosque in Huangpu. According to the 2010 census of China, there are an estimated 85,000 Muslims in Shanghai.

Shanghai has several folk religious temples, including the City God Temple at the heart of the Old City, the Dajing Ge Pavilion dedicated to the Three Kingdoms general Guan Yu, the Confucian Temple of Shanghai, and a major Taoist centre Shanghai White Cloud Temple where the Shanghai Taoist Association locates.

=== Language ===
Ability to speak the following dialects/languages in Shanghai (2013)
Languages	%	Can Speak
Mandarin	97.0%
Shanghainese	81.4%
English	47.5%
Other Chinese	29.7%
Other foreign languages	7.8%
Sampled among residents ≥ 13 years old.

The vernacular language spoken in the city is Shanghainese, part of the Northern Wu subgroup of Wu Chinese. This is different from the national language, Mandarin, which is mutually unintelligible with Shanghainese. Modern Shanghainese has a high degree of mutual intelligibility with and has received much influence from Northern Wu varieties from other nearby cities such as Suzhounese and Ningbonese. Suburban varieties in Shanghai are closely related to the urban variety, but are a lot more conservative.

Before its rise to prominence, the language spoken in Shanghai was not as prominent as those spoken around Jiaxing and later Suzhou, and was known as "the local tongue" (本地闲话; 本地閑話; pen-di ghe-gho), a name which is now used in suburbs only. In the late 19th century, downtown Shanghainese (市区闲话; 市區閑話; zy-chiu ghe-gho or simply simplified Chinese: 上海闲话; traditional Chinese: 上海閑話; zaon-he ghe-gho) underwent rapid changes and replaced Suzhounese as the prestige dialect of the Yangtze River Delta region. At the time, most immigration into the city came from the two adjacent provinces, Jiangsu and Zhejiang; as such, their regional varieties had the greatest influence on Shanghainese. After 1949, Putonghua (Standard Mandarin) also had an impact on Shanghainese because it was promoted by the government. Many migrants have come to Shanghai in search for education and jobs since the 1990s, and are unable to speak the local language, instead using Putonghua (Mandarin) as a lingua franca. Because Putonghua and English were more favored, Shanghainese began to decline, and fluency among young speakers weakened. In recent years, there have been movements within the city to promote the local language and protect it from fading out.

== Education and research ==
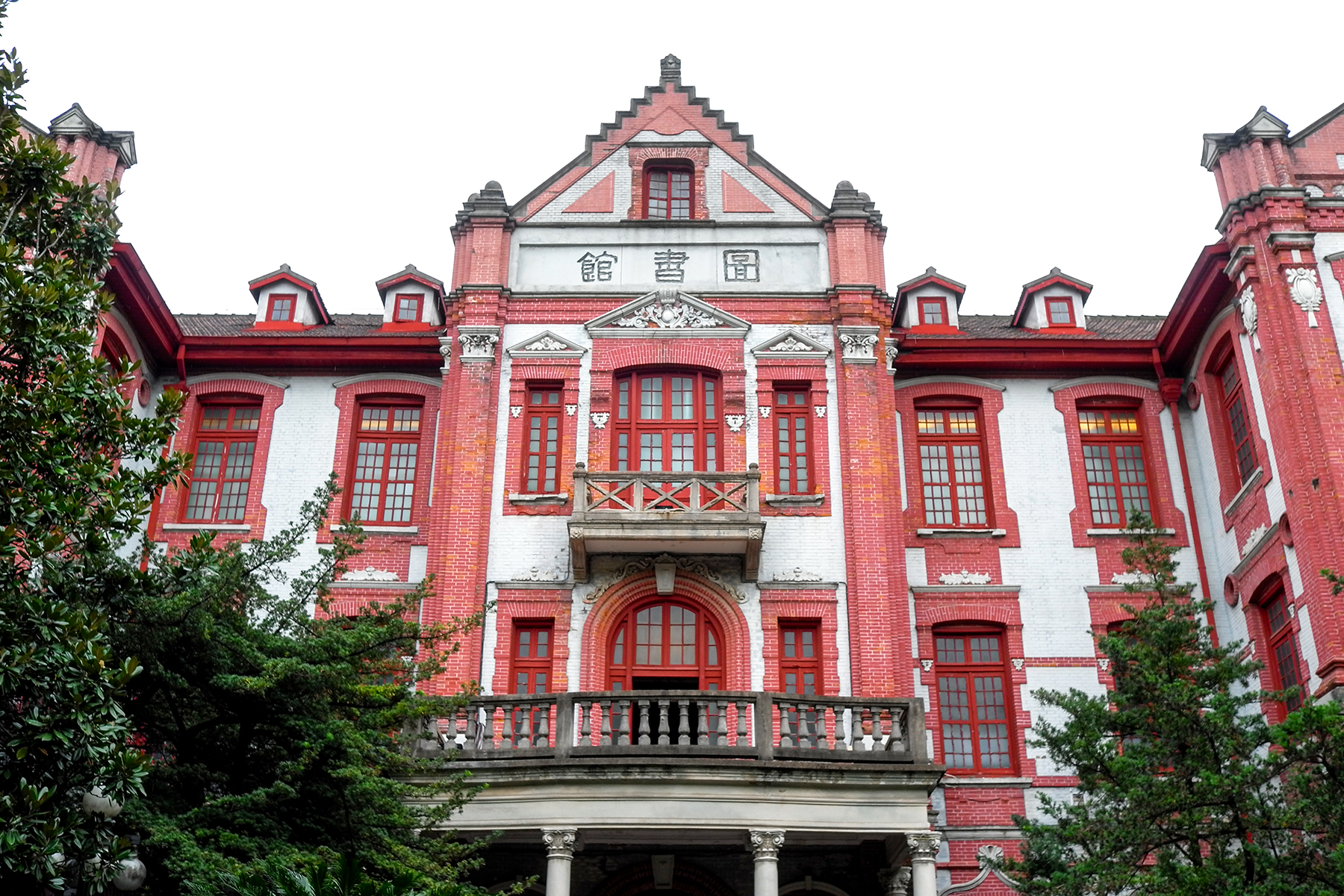
Shanghai Jiao Tong University Library

Shanghai is an international centre of research and development and as of 2025, it was ranked second globally (after Beijing) by scientific research outputs, as tracked by the Nature Index. When compared to other countries, Shanghai ranked higher than France and nearly on par with Japan, securing sixth place globally after China, the US, Germany, the United Kingdom, and Japan, according to the Nature Index for 2025. For instance, Shanghai's share of the 2024 Nature Index is 3,153.61, with a count of 6,680, while Japan's share is 3,185.39, with 5,555 counts.

As of 2023, Shanghai had 68 universities and colleges, ranking first in East China region as a city with most higher education institutions. The city government's education agency is the Shanghai Municipal Education Commission.

Shanghai has 15 universities listed in 147 Double First-Class Universities, ranking second nationwide among Chinese cities (after Beijing). According to the U.S. News & World Report Best Global University Ranking for 2026–27, Shanghai had the second highest concentration of universities among all major cities in the world (after Beijing) included in the ranking, totaling 24, with two in the top 50, four in the top 250, and six in the global top 500. In the 2025 Academic Ranking of World Universities, Shanghai had two in the top 40, three in the top 150 and nine in the top 500. Some of these universities were selected as "985 universities" or "211 universities" since the 90s by the Chinese government to build world-class universities.

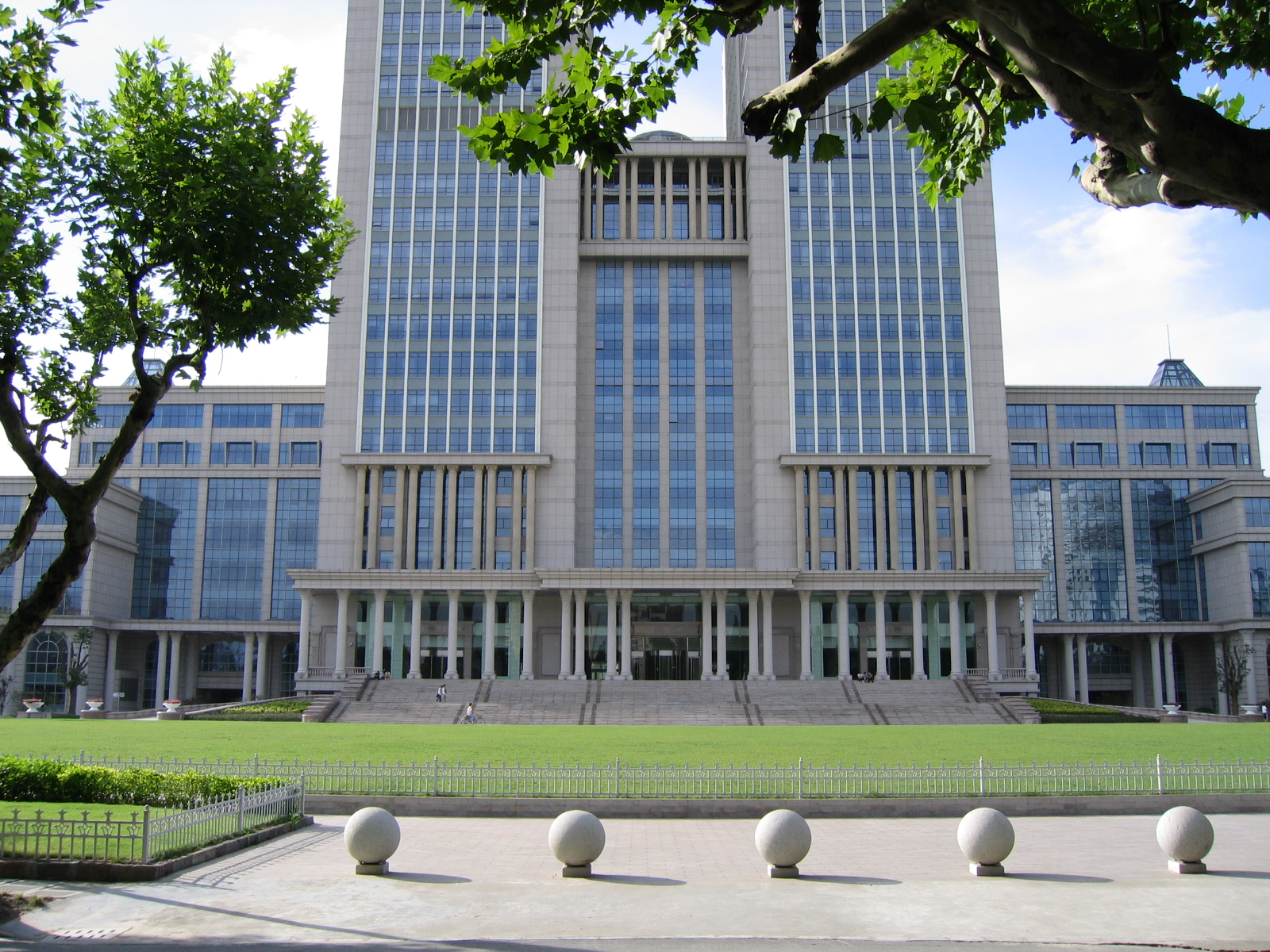
Fudan University

Shanghai has two members (Fudan University and Shanghai Jiao Tong University) in the C9 League, an alliance of elite Chinese universities offering comprehensive and leading education. These two universities are consistently ranked in the Asia top 10 and global top 50. As of 2025, Fudan University and Shanghai Jiao Tong University were ranked in the global top 35 research comprehensive universities based on aggregate performance from three widely observed university rankings (THE+ARWU+QS).

The other two members of Project 985, Tongji University and East China Normal University, are also based in Shanghai and internationally; they were ranked they ranked 150–175th globally by the Times Higher Education World Reputation Rankings where . Shanghai University of Sport is also based in the city, which is consistently ranked the best in China among universities specialized in sports, and as of 2025, SUS was ranked #1 in Asia and #23 globally according to the "Global Ranking of Sport Science Schools and Departments" released by Shanghai Ranking.

The city has many Chinese–foreign joint education institutes, such as the Shanghai University–University of Technology Sydney Business School since 1994, the University of Michigan–Shanghai Jiao Tong University Joint Institute since 2006, and New York University Shanghai—the first China–U.S. joint venture university—since 2012. In 2013, the Shanghai Municipality and the Chinese Academy of Sciences founded the ShanghaiTech University in the Zhangjiang Hi-Tech Park in Pudong. The city is also a seat of the Shanghai Academy of Social Sciences, China's oldest think tank for the humanities and social sciences.

By the end of 2023, the city also had a total of 49 institutions for postgraduate education, 900 secondary schools, 70 vocational schools, 664 primary schools, and 31 special education schools. Five years of primary education and four years of junior secondary education are free, with a gross enrollment ratio of over 99.9%. In 2009 and 2012, 15-year-old students from Shanghai ranked first in every subject (math, reading, and science) in the Program for International Student Assessment. The consecutive three-year senior secondary education is priced and uses the Senior High School Entrance Examination (Zhongkao) as a selection process, with a gross enrollment ratio of 98%. Shanghai High School, No. 2 High School Attached to East China Normal University, High School Affiliated to Fudan University, and High School Affiliated to Shanghai Jiao Tong University—are termed "The Four Schools" ("四校") of Shanghai and highlighted as having the best teaching quality in the city.

== Transport ==
=== Public ===
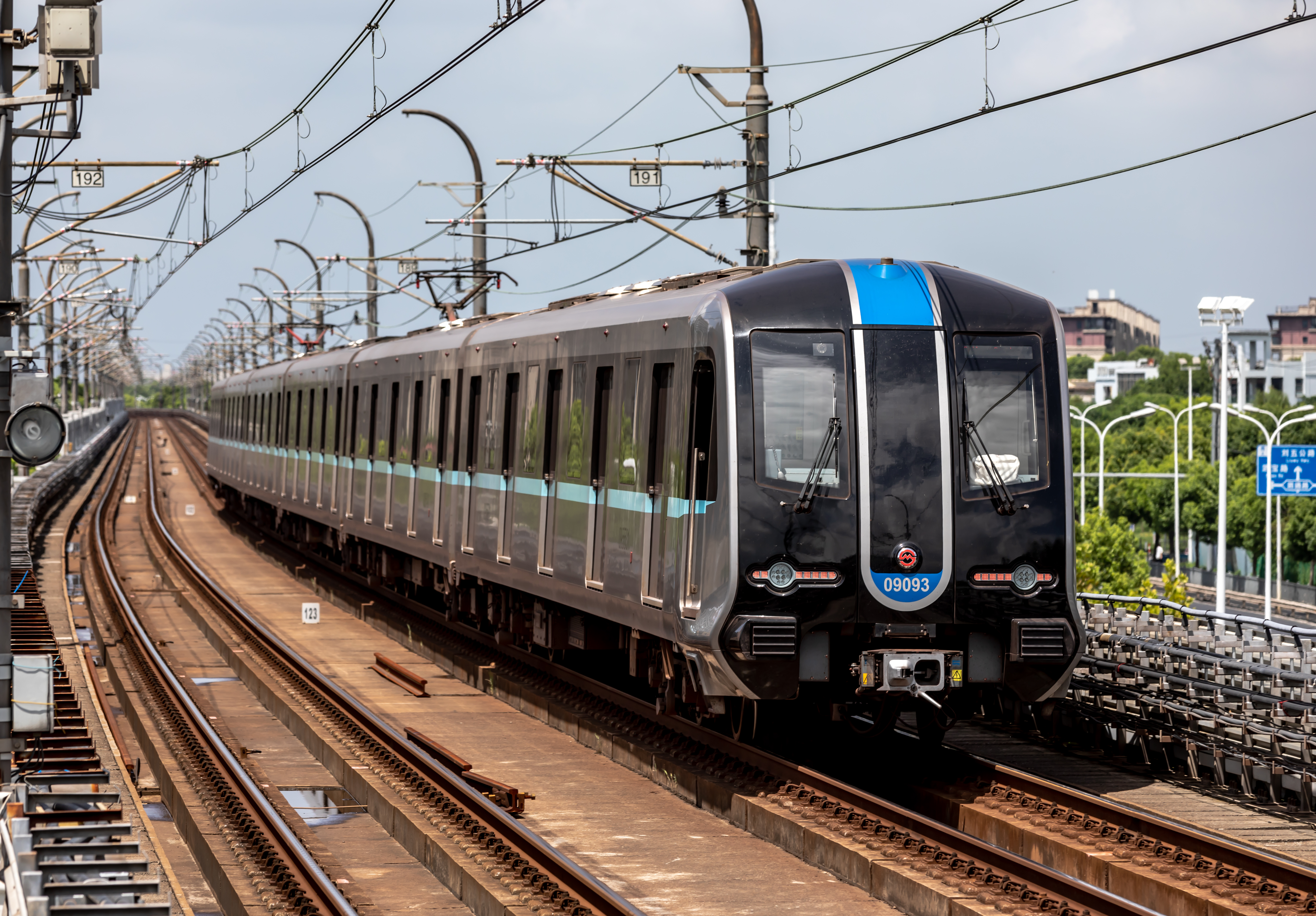
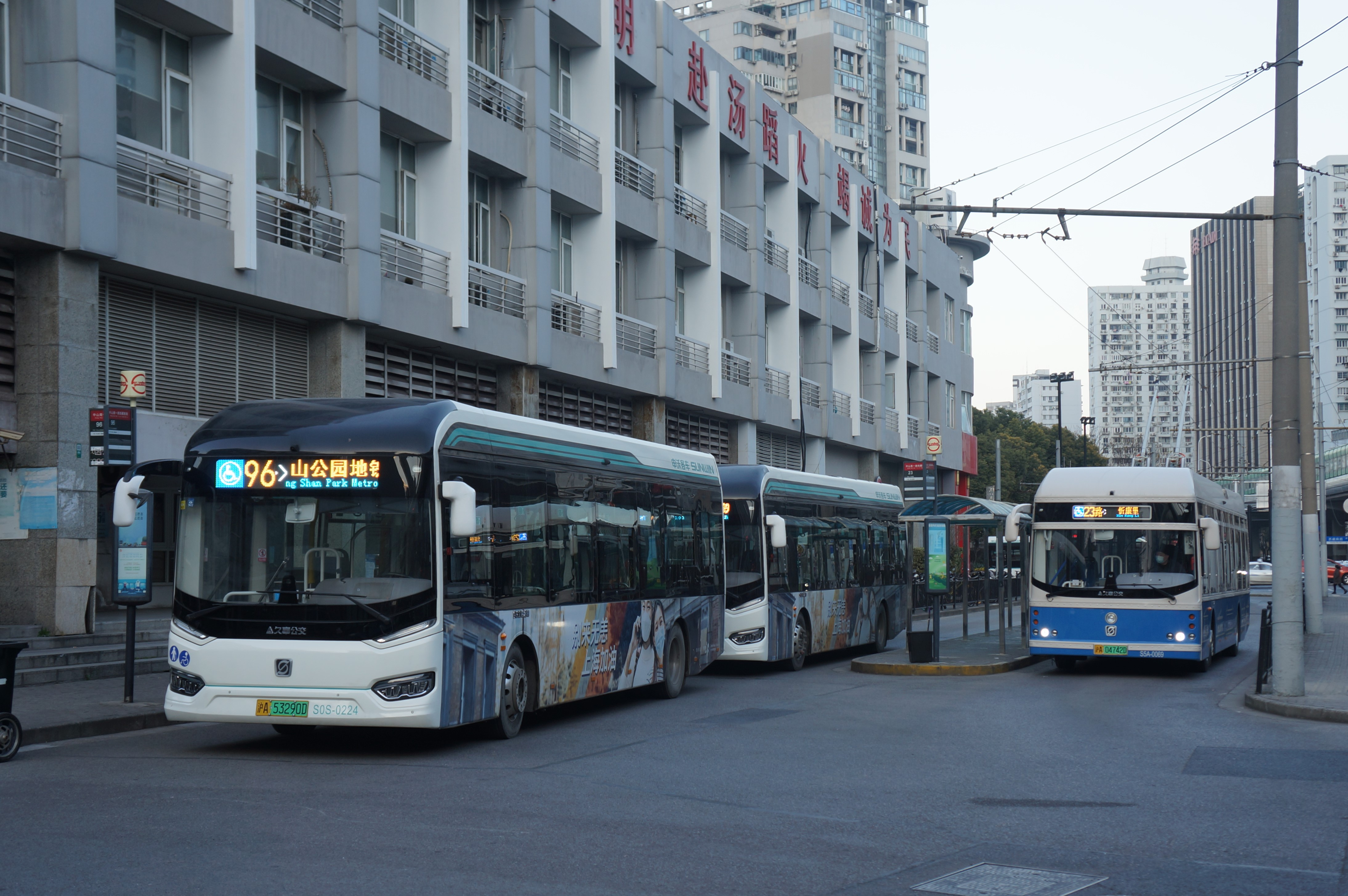
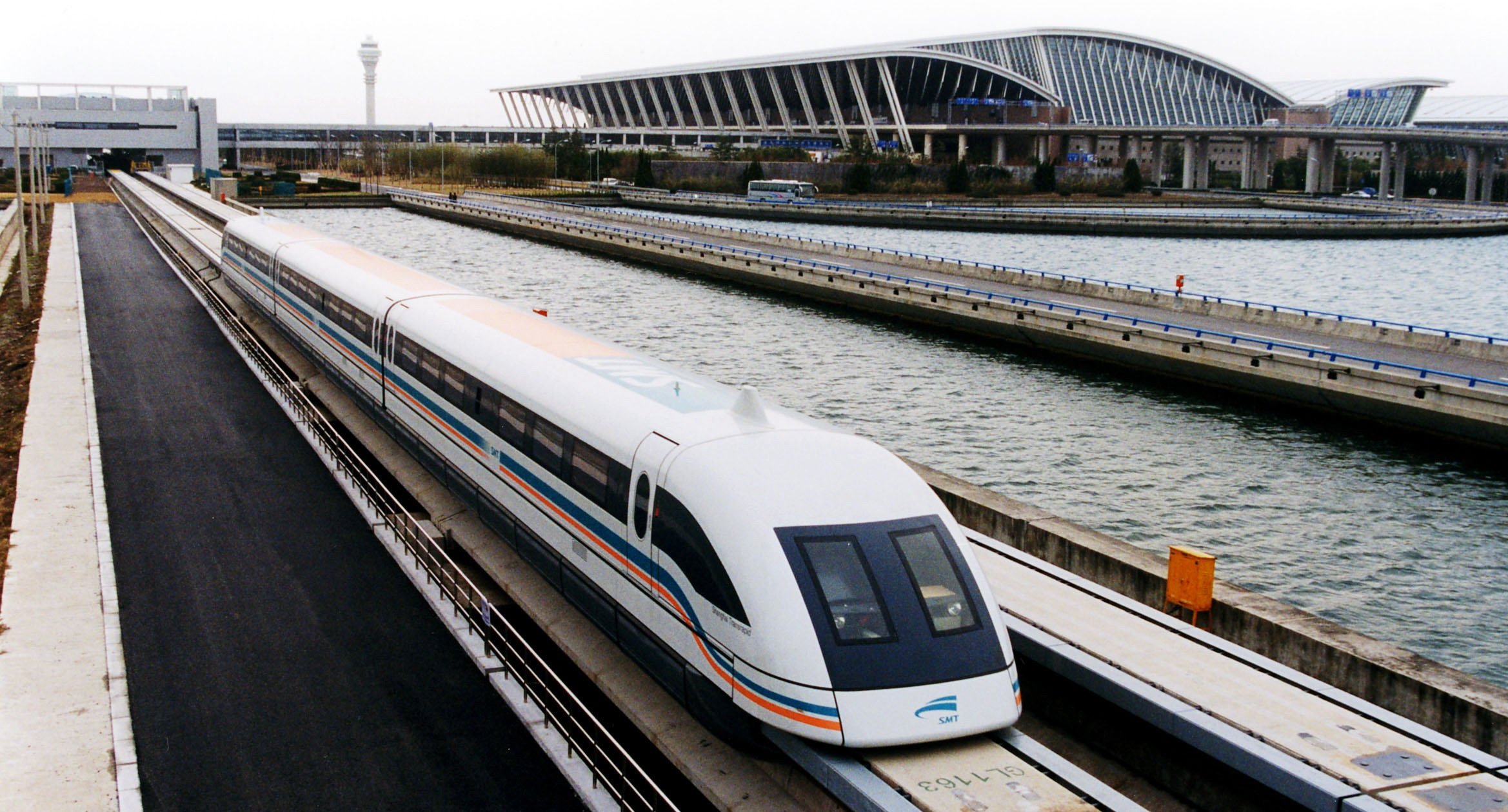
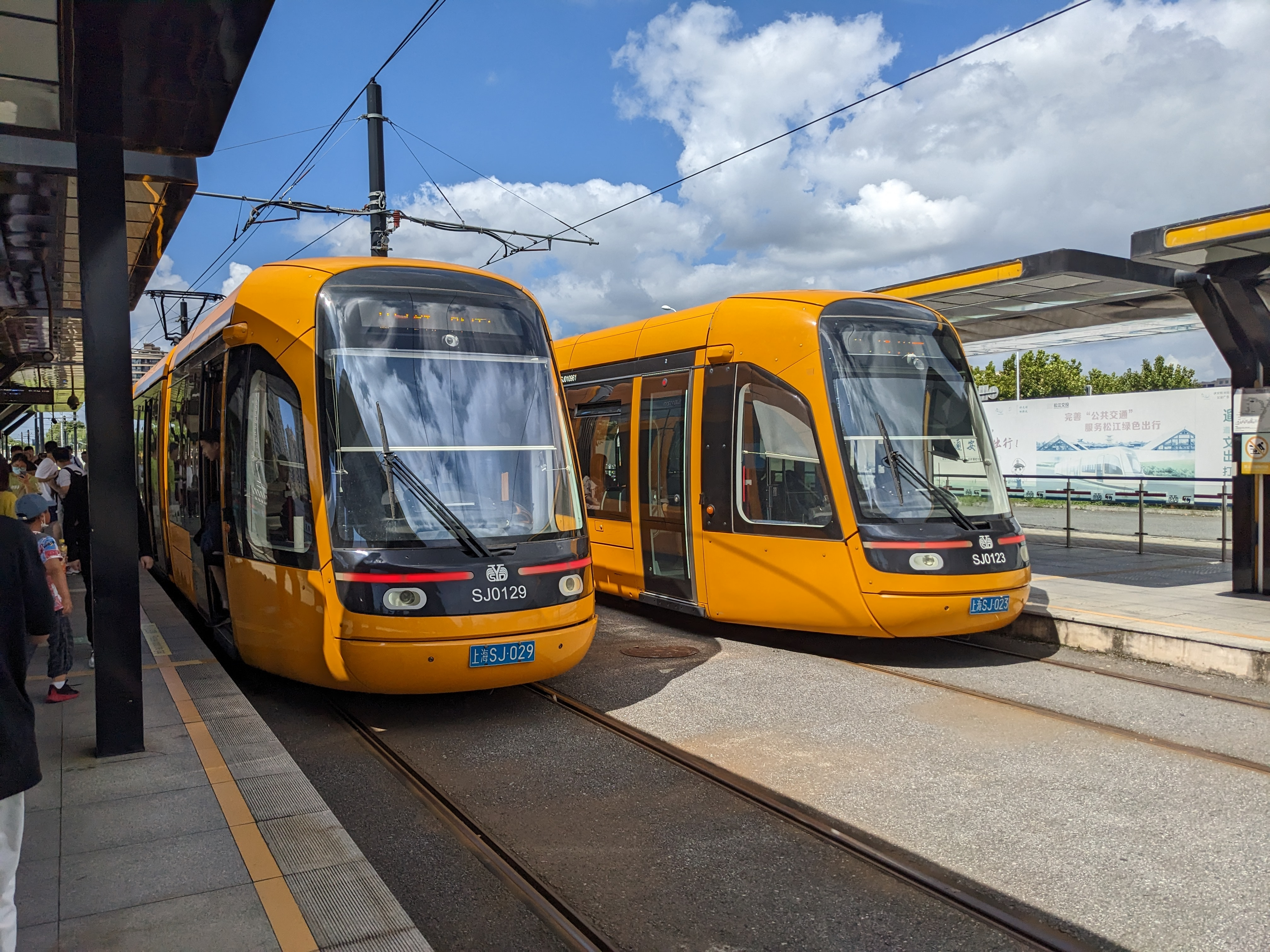
Various modes of public transport in Shanghai. From top to bottom, left to right: Shanghai Metro, buses and trolleybuses, Shanghai Maglev and Songjiang Tram

Shanghai has a public transportation system comprising metros, buses, ferries, and taxis, which can be accessed using a Shanghai Public Transport Card.

Shanghai's rapid transit system, the Shanghai Metro, incorporates subway and light metro lines and extends to each core urban district as well as neighboring suburban districts. As of 2025, there are 19 metro lines (excluding the Shanghai maglev train and Jinshan railway), 508 stations, and 808 kilometres (502 mi) of lines in operation, making it the longest network in the world. On 8 March 2019, it set the city's daily metro ridership record with 13.3 million. Opened in 2004, the Shanghai maglev train is the first and the fastest commercial high-speed maglev in the world, with a maximum operation speed of 430 kilometres per hour (270 mph).

The first tram line in Shanghai was opened in 1908. By 1925, there were 328 tramcars and 14 routes operated by Chinese, French, and British companies collaboratively, all of which were nationalized in 1949. Since the 1960s, tram lines were either dismantled or replaced by trolleybus or motorbus lines; the last tram line was demolished in 1975. Shanghai reintroduced trams in 2010 with the rubber-tyred Zhangjiang Tram. In 2018, the steel wheeled Songjiang Tram started operating in Songjiang District.

Shanghai has the world's most extensive bus network, including the world's oldest continuously operating trolleybus system, with 1,575 lines covering a total length of 8,997 kilometres (5,590 mi) by 2019. The system is operated by multiple companies. As of 2024, 30,900 taxis were in operation in Shanghai, which carried 134 million passengers that year.

=== Roads and expressways ===
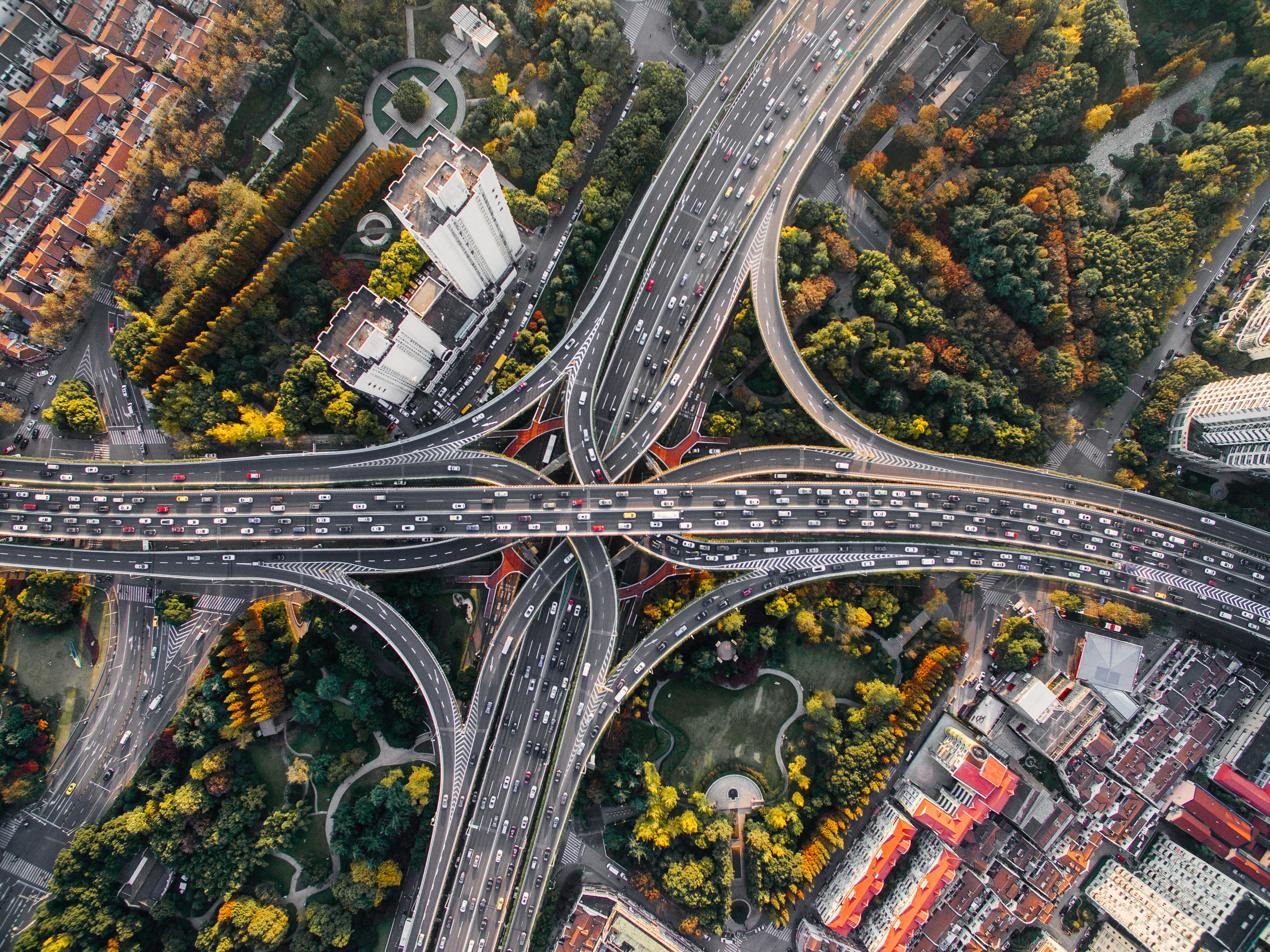
Interchange between Yan'an Elevated Road and North–South Elevated Road

Shanghai is a major hub of China's expressway network. Many national expressways pass through or end in Shanghai, including Jinghu Expressway, Hurong Expressway, Shenhai Expressway, Hushaan Expressway, Huyu Expressway, Hukun Expressway, and Shanghai Ring Expressway. There are also numerous municipal expressways prefixed with the letter S. As of 2019, Shanghai has 12 bridges and 14 tunnels crossing the Huangpu River.

Bicycle lanes are common in Shanghai, separating non-motorized traffic from car traffic on most surface streets. However, bicycles and motorcycles are banned on expressways and some main roads. Cycling has increased in popularity due to the emergence of dockless, app-based bicycle-sharing systems, such as Mobike, Hello, and DiDi Bike. As of December 2018, bicycle-sharing systems had an average of 1.15 million daily riders within the city.

Private car ownership in Shanghai is rapidly increasing: in 2019, there were 3.40 million private cars in the city, a 12.5% increase from 2018. New private cars cannot be driven without a license plate, which are sold in monthly license plate auctions. Around 9,500 license plates are auctioned each month, and the average price was about CN¥89,600 (US$12,739) in 2019. This policy was introduced to limit the growth of automobile traffic and alleviate congestion.

=== Railways ===
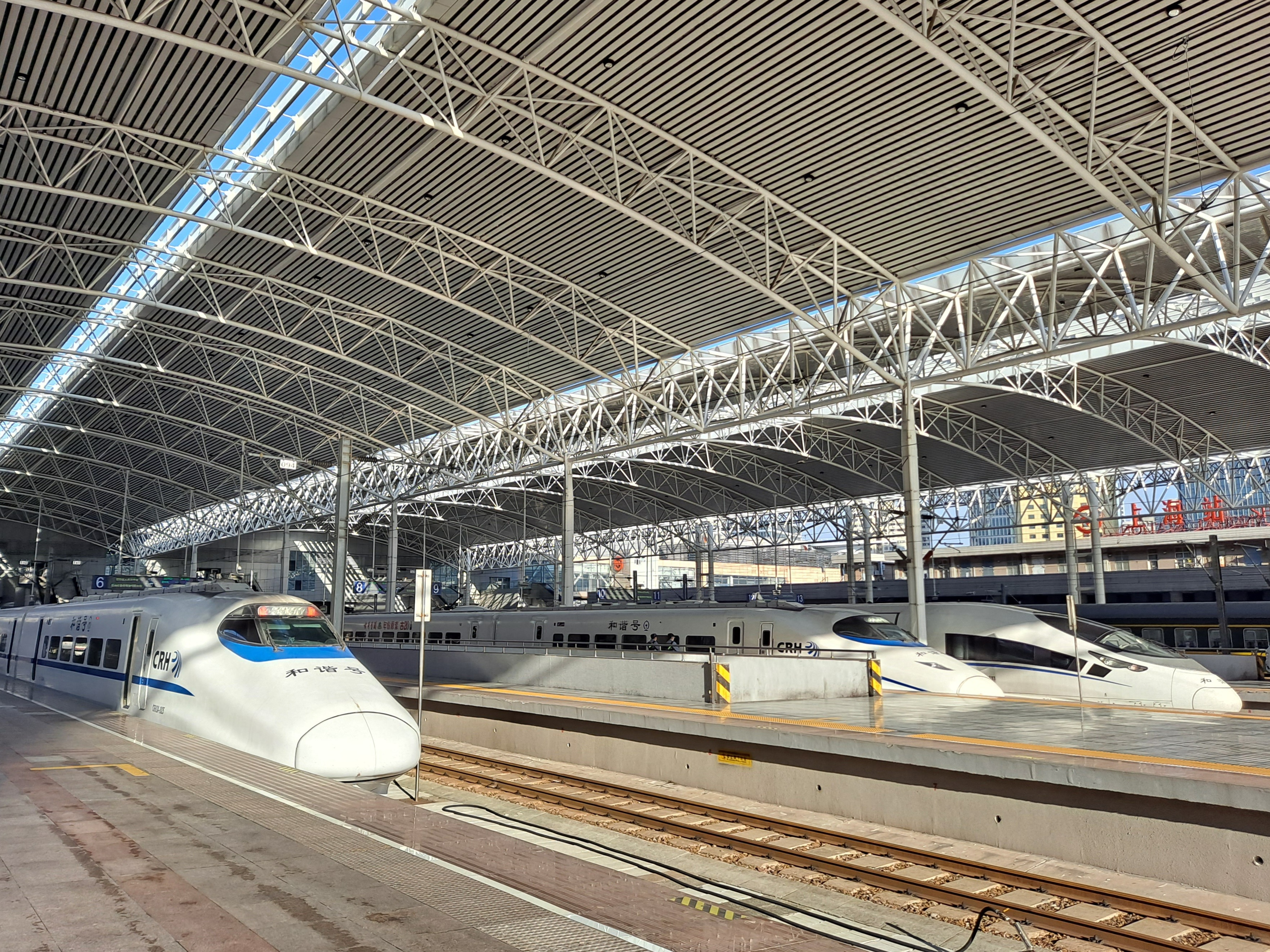
Shanghai railway station

Shanghai has four major railway stations: Shanghai railway station, Shanghai South railway station, Shanghai Songjiang railway station, and Shanghai Hongqiao railway station.

Built in 1876, the Woosung railway was the first railway in Shanghai and the first railway in operation in China By 1909, Shanghai–Nanjing railway and Shanghai–Hangzhou railway were in service. As of October 2019, the two railways have been integrated into two main railways in China: Beijing–Shanghai railway and Shanghai–Kunming railway, respectively.

Shanghai is a terminus for five high-speed railways (HSRs): Beijing–Shanghai HSR (overlaps with Shanghai–Wuhan–Chengdu passenger railway), Shanghai–Nanjing intercity railway, Shanghai–Kunming HSR, Shanghai–Nantong railway, and Shanghai–Suzhou–Huzhou HSR.

Shanghai also has four commuter railways: Pudong railway (although passenger service was suspended in 2015) and Jinshan railway operated by China Railway, and Line 16 and Line 17 operated by Shanghai Metro. As of January 2022, four additional lines—Chongming line, Jiamin line, Airport Link line and Lianggang Express line—are under construction.

The Airport Link line, a 68.6-kilometre line connecting Hongqiao Airport and Pudong airport, opened in December 2024.

=== Air and sea ===
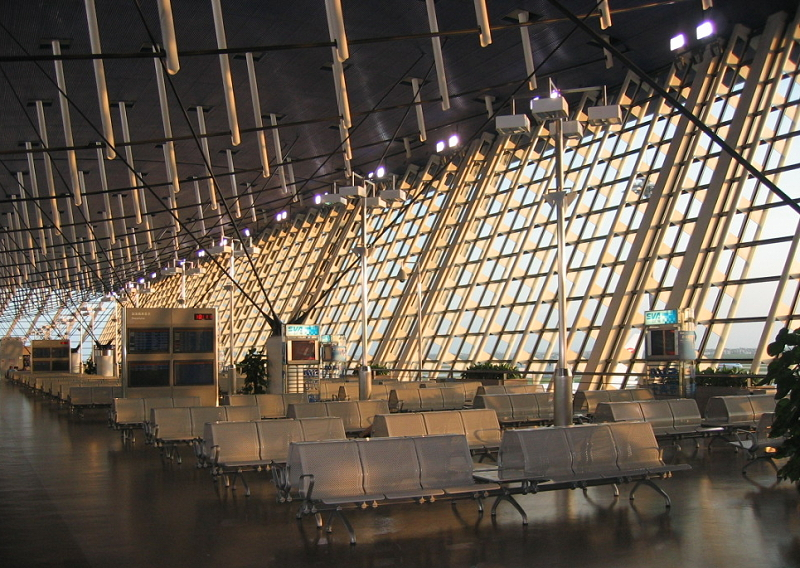
Inside Shanghai Pudong International Airport Terminal 1

Shanghai is one of the largest air transportation hubs in Asia. The city has two commercial airports: Shanghai Pudong International Airport and Shanghai Hongqiao International Airport. Pudong is the primary international airport, while Hongqiao mainly operates domestic flights with limited short-haul international flights. In 2018, Pudong International Airport served 74.0 million passengers and handled 3.8 million tons of cargo, making it the ninth-busiest airport by passenger volume and third-busiest airport by cargo volume. The same year, Hongqiao International Airport served 43.6 million passengers, making it the 19th-busiest airport by passenger volume.

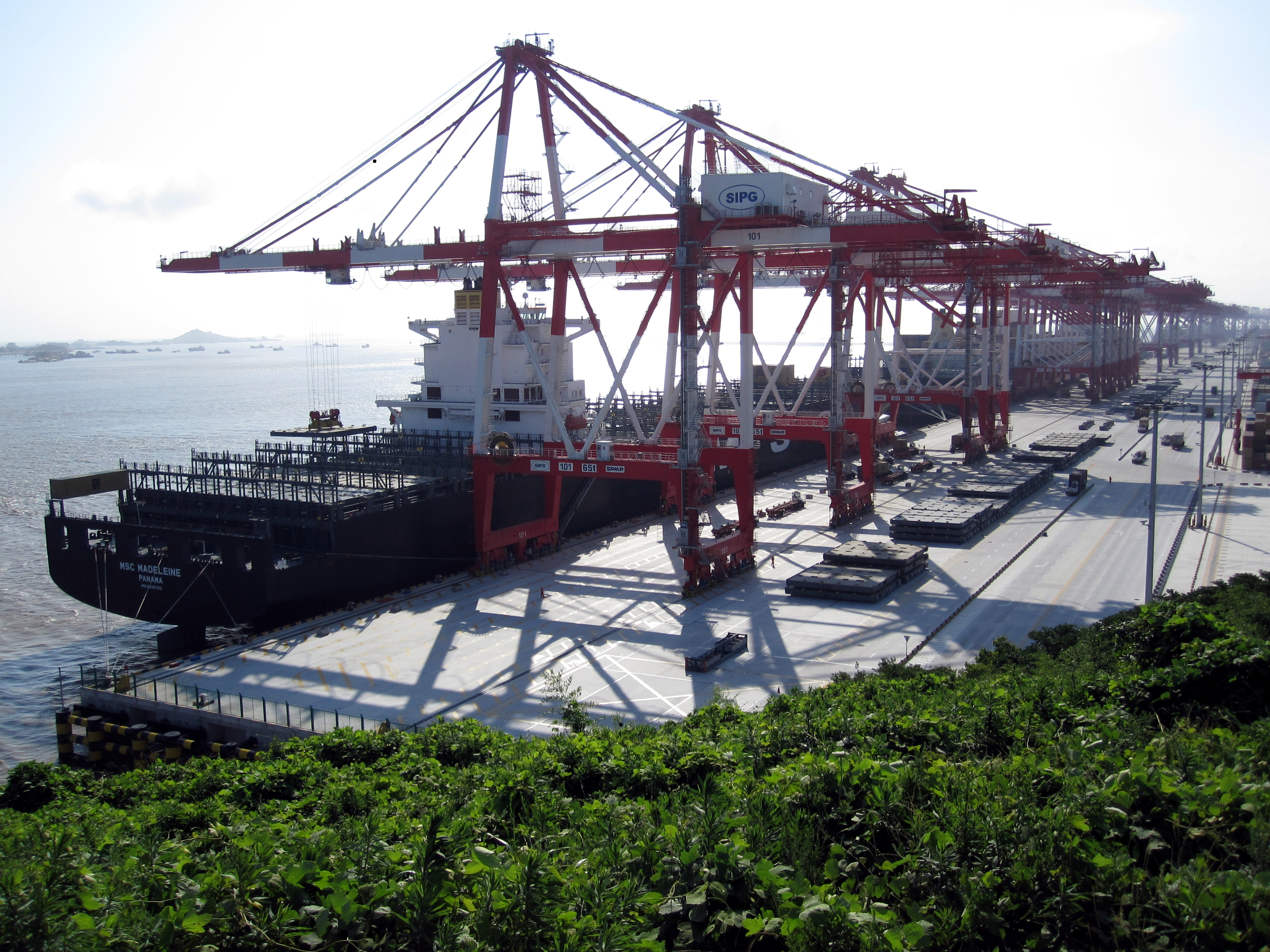
Due to Yangshan Port, Shanghai has become the world's busiest container port.

Since its opening, the Port of Shanghai has become the largest port in China. Yangshan Port was built in 2005 because the river was unsuitable for docking large container ships. The port is connected with the mainland through the 32-kilometer (20 mi) long Donghai Bridge. In 2010, it became world's busiest container port with an annual TEU transportation of 42 million in 2018. The Port of Shanghai also handled 259 cruises and 1.89 million passengers in 2019. Although the port is run by the Shanghai International Port Group under the government of Shanghai, it administratively belongs to Shengsi County, Zhejiang. Shanghai is part of the 21st Century Maritime Silk Road that runs from the Chinese coast to the northern Italian hub of Trieste.

== Culture ==
The culture of Shanghai was formed by a combination of the Wuyue culture and the "East Meets West" Haipai culture. Wuyue culture's influence is manifested in Shanghainese language—which comprises dialectal elements from Jiaxing, Suzhou, and Ningbo—and Shanghai cuisine, which was influenced by those of Jiangsu and Zhejiang. Haipai culture emerged after Shanghai became a prosperous port in the early 20th century, with foreigners from Europe, America, Japan, and India moving into the city. The culture fuses elements of Western cultures with the local Wuyue culture, and its influence extends to the city's literature, fashion, architecture, music, and cuisine. The term Haipai was coined by Beijing writers in 1920 to criticize Shanghai scholars for admiring capitalism and Western culture. In the early 21st century, Shanghai has been recognized as a new influence and inspiration for cyberpunk culture. The city is recognized by UNESCO as a "City of Design" since February 2010.

=== Museums ===
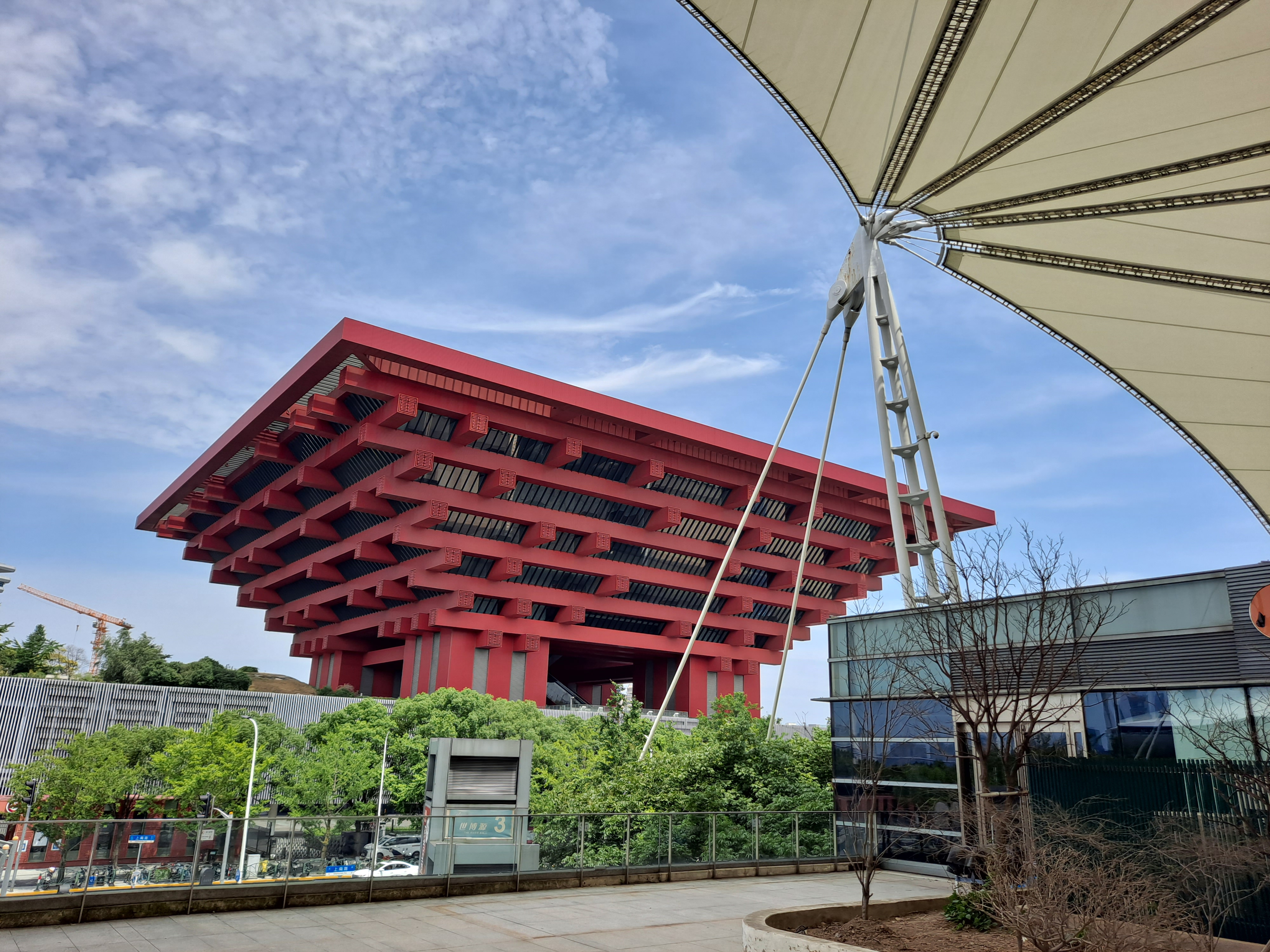
The China Art Museum, located in Pudong

Cultural curation in Shanghai has grown since 2013, with several new museums having been opened in the city. This is in part due to the city's 2018 development plans, which aim to make Shanghai "an excellent global city". The Shanghai Museum has one of the largest collections of Chinese artifacts in the world, including a large collection of ancient Chinese bronzes and ceramics. The China Art Museum is one of the largest museums in Asia and displays an animated replica of the 12th century painting Along the River During the Qingming Festival. The Shanghai Natural History Museum and the Shanghai Science and Technology Museum are natural history and science museums. There are numerous smaller, specialist museums housed in archeological and historical sites, such as the Songze Museum, the Site of the First National Congress of the Chinese Communist Party, the site of the former Provisional Government of the Republic of Korea, the Shanghai Jewish Refugees Museum, and the Shanghai Post Office Museum (located in the General Post Office Building).

=== Cuisine ===
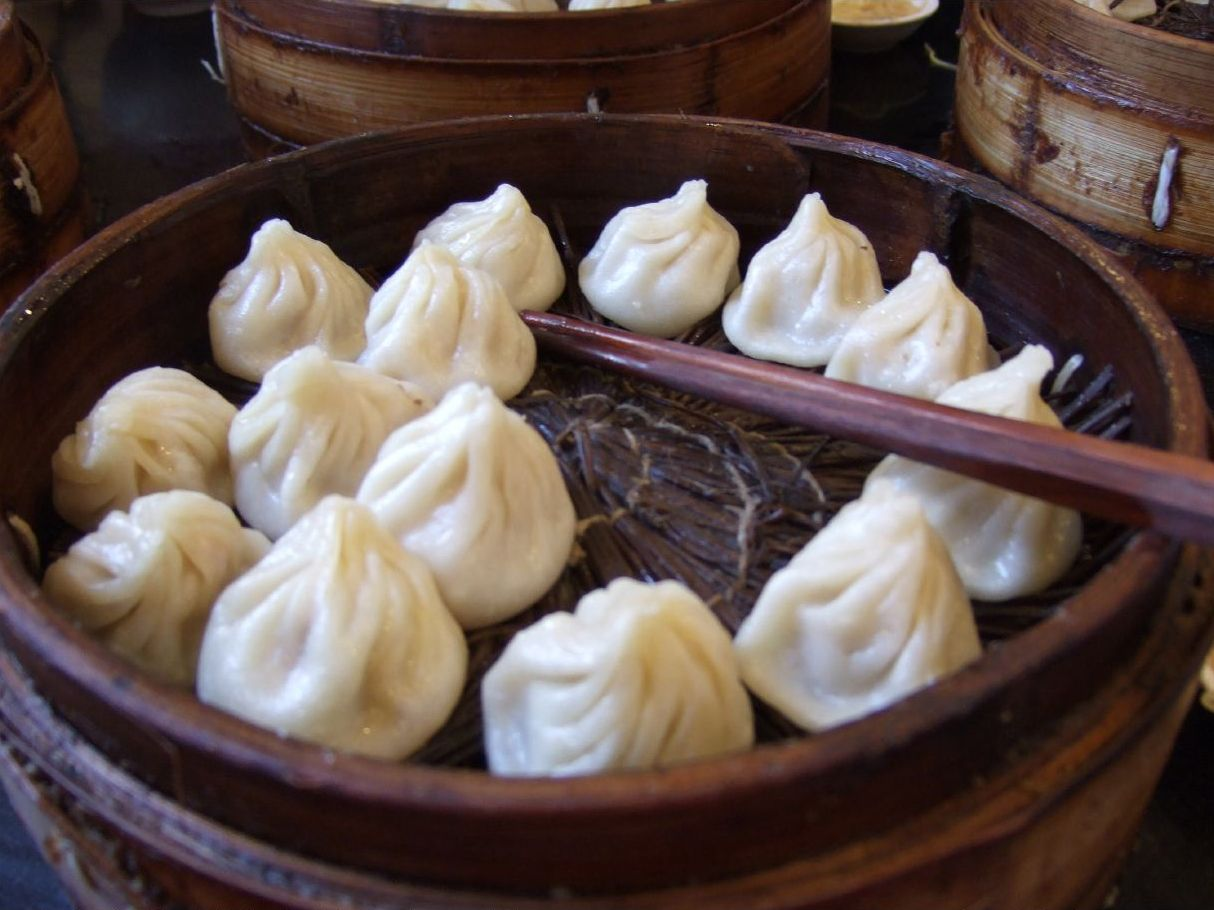
Xiaolongbao in Shanghai

Benbang cuisine (本帮菜) is cooking style that originated in the 1600s, with influences from surrounding provinces. It emphasizes the use of condiments while retaining the original flavors of the raw ingredients. Sugar is an important ingredient in Benbang cuisine, especially in combination with soy sauce. Signature dishes of Benbang cuisine include Xiaolongbao, Red braised pork belly, and Shanghai hairy crab.

Haipai cuisine is a Western-influenced cooking style that originated in Shanghai. It uses elements from French, British, Russian, German, and Italian cuisines and adapted them for local taste preferences and to incorporate local ingredients. Haipai cuisine dishes include Shanghai-style borscht (罗宋汤, "Russian soup"), crispy pork cutlets, and Shanghai salad, derived from Olivier salad. Both Benbang and Haipai cuisine use various seafoods including freshwater fish, shrimp, and crab.

=== Visual arts ===
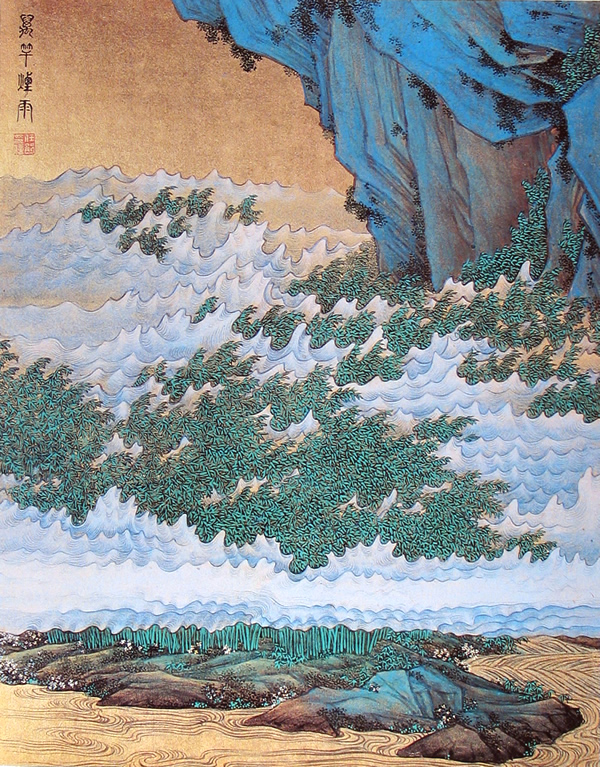
十万图之四 (No. 4 of a Hundred Thousand Scenes) by Ren Xiong, a pioneer of the Shanghai School of Chinese art, c. 1850

The Songjiang School (淞江派), containing the Huating School (华亭派) founded by Gu Zhengyi, was a small painting school in Shanghai during the Ming and Qing Dynasties. It was represented by Dong Qichang. The school was considered an expansion of the Wu School in Suzhou, the cultural centre of the Jiangnan region at the time. The Shanghai School commenced in the 19th century, focusing on the visual content of painting through the use of bright colours, using secular objects like flowers and birds as themes. Western art was introduced to Shanghai in 1847 by Spanish missionary Joannes Ferrer (范廷佐), and the city's first Western atelier was established in 1864 inside the Tushanwan orphanage (土山湾孤儿院). During the Republic of China, artists including Zhang Daqian, Liu Haisu, Xu Beihong, Feng Zikai, and Yan Wenliang settled in Shanghai, allowing it to become the art centre of China. Art forms such as photography, wood carving, sculpture, comics (Manhua), and Lianhuanhua—thrived. Sanmao was created to dramatize the chaos created by the Second Sino-Japanese War. The most comprehensive art and cultural facility in Shanghai is the China Art Museum, with 64,000 square metres (690,000 sq ft) of exhibition space.

Since 2001, Shanghai has held Shanghai Fashion Week each April and October. The main venue is in Fuxing Park, and the opening and closing ceremonies are held in the Shanghai Fashion Center. The April session is also part of the one-month Shanghai International Fashion Culture Festival.

=== Performance arts ===
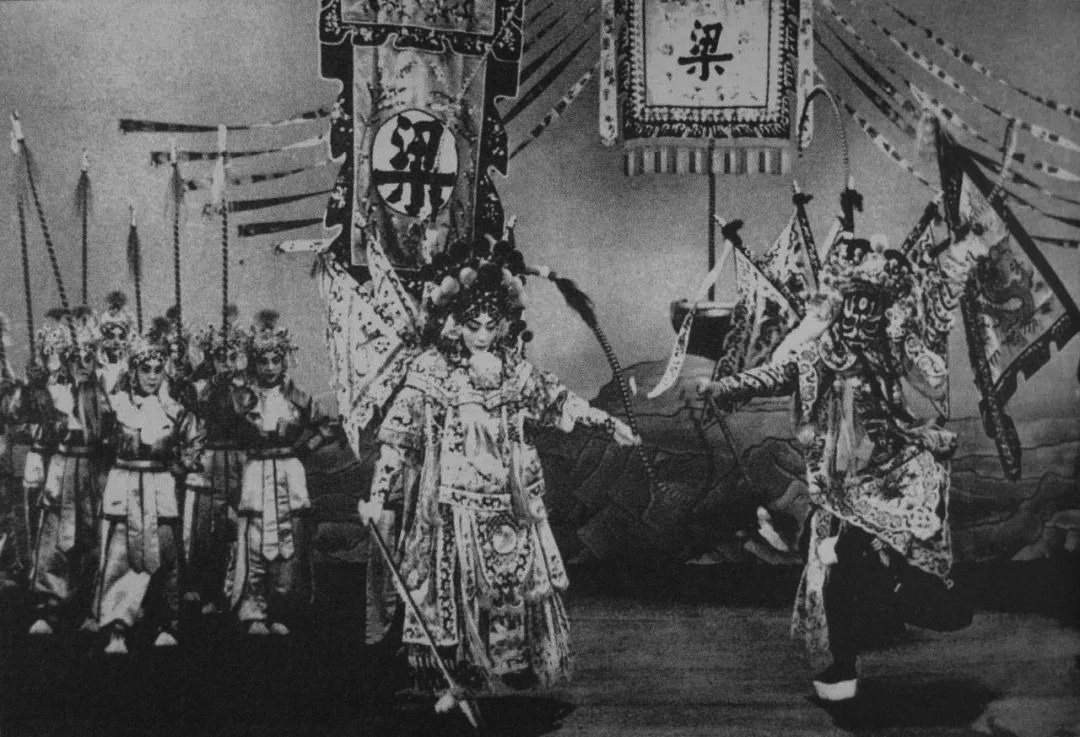
Mei Lanfang performing the Peking opera "Resisting the Jin Army" at Tianchan Theatre

Traditional Chinese opera became a popular source of public entertainment in the late 19th century. In the early 20th century, monologue and burlesque in Shanghainese appeared, absorbing elements from traditional dramas. In the 1920s, Pingtan performance art expanded from Suzhou to Shanghai; commercial radio stations expanded its popularity in the 1930s, with 103 programs every day. A Shanghai-style Beijing Opera was formed in the 1930s, led by Zhou Xinfang and Gai Jiaotian. A small troupe from Shengxian (now Shengzhou) promoted Yue opera on the Shanghainese stage. Shanghai opera was formed when local folksongs were fused with modern operas.

Drama appeared in missionary schools in Shanghai in the late 19th century, mainly performed in English. Scandals in Officialdom (官场丑史), staged in 1899, was one of the earliest-recorded plays. In 1907, Uncle Tom's Cabin; or, Life Among the Lowly (黑奴吁天录) was performed at the Lyceum Theatre.

Shanghai is the birthplace of Chinese cinema; China's first short film, The Difficult Couple (1913), and the country's first fictional feature film, An Orphan Rescues His Grandfather (孤儿救祖记, 1923) were both produced in the city. Shanghai's film industry grew during the early 1930s, generating stars such as Hu Die, Ruan Lingyu, Zhou Xuan, Jin Yan, and Zhao Dan. The exile of Shanghainese filmmakers and actors during the Second Sino-Japanese War and the Communist revolution contributed to the development of the Hong Kong film industry. Shanghai Television Festival, founded in 1986, is the earliest international TV festival founded in China. The Shanghai International Film Festival was founded in 1993 and is one of the nine major international film festivals in the A category.

== Sports ==
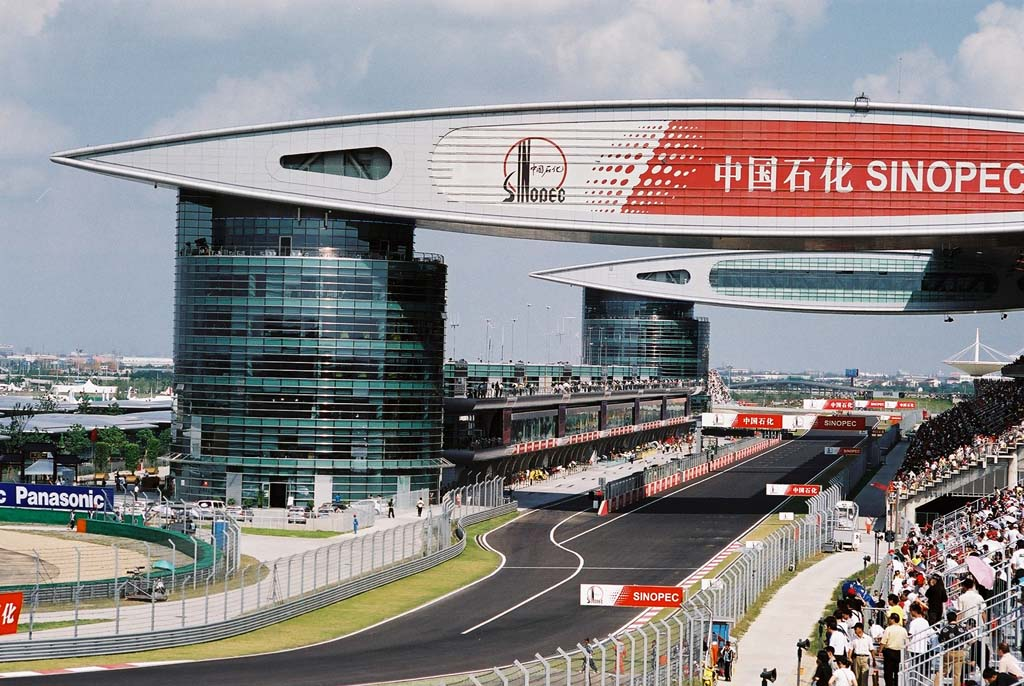
F1 Chinese Grand Prix in Shanghai

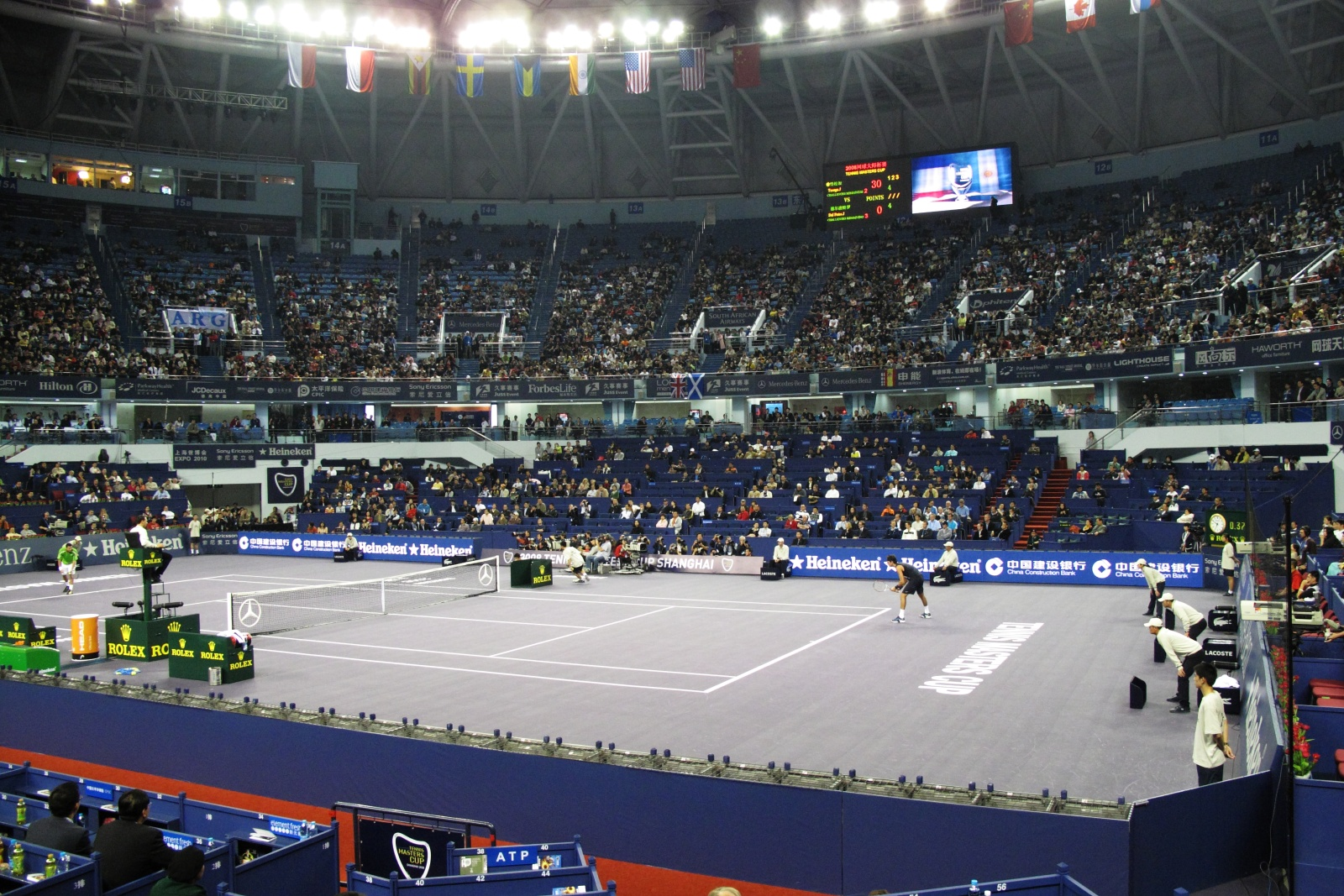
Shanghai Masters in Qizhong Forest Sports City Arena

Shanghai has several football teams, including two in the Chinese Super League: Shanghai Shenhua and Shanghai Port. Shanghai's top-tier basketball team, the Shanghai Sharks of the Chinese Basketball Association, developed Yao Ming before he entered the NBA. Shanghai's baseball team, the Shanghai Golden Eagles, plays in the China Baseball League. Professional athletes from Shanghai include 110 metres hurdles runner Liu Xiang, table tennis player Wang Liqin, and badminton player Wang Yihan.

The Shanghai Cricket Club dates back to 1858, when the first recorded cricket match was played between a team of British Naval officers and a Shanghai 11. The Shanghai cricket team played various international matches between 1866 and 1948 as China's de facto China national cricket team. After going dormant in 1949 after the founding of the PRC, the club was re-established in 1994 by expatriates living in the city and has since grown to over 300 members.

Shanghai hosts several international sports events. Since 2004, it has hosted the Chinese Grand Prix, a round of the Formula One World Championship, at the Shanghai International Circuit. The city also hosts the Shanghai Masters tennis tournament, which is part of ATP World Tour Masters 1000, as well as golf tournaments including the BMW Masters and WGC-HSBC Champions. In 2023, Shanghai hosted 118 sports events, with 190,000 participants and 1.29 million spectators, driving a consumption of CN¥3.713 billion (US$510.83 million).

== Environment ==
=== Parks and resorts ===
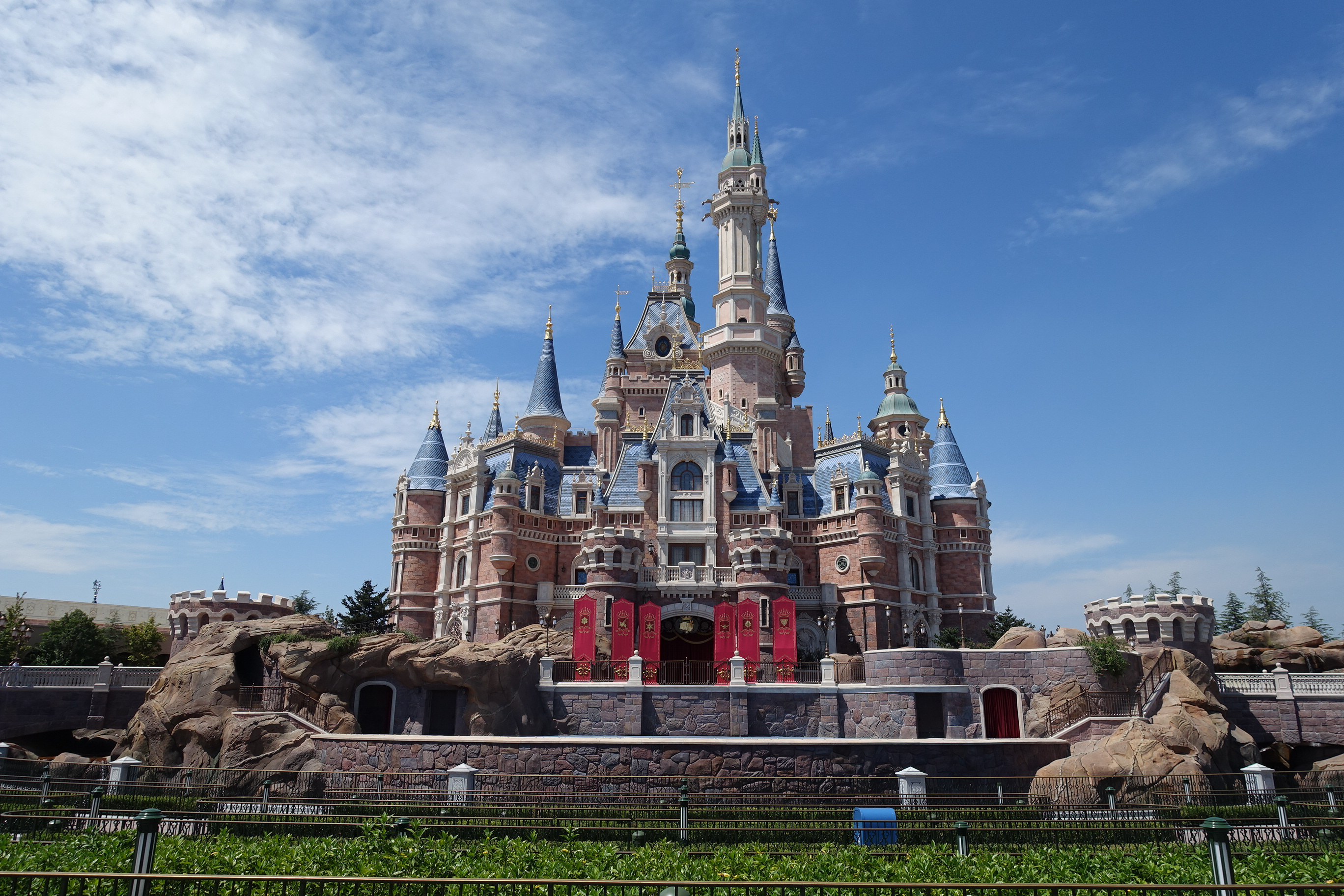
Enchanted Storybook Castle of Shanghai Disneyland

Shanghai has an extensive public park system; by 2022, the city had 670 parks, of which 281 had free admission, and the per capita park area was 9 square metres (97 sq ft). The largest park in Shanghai is Century Park in Pudong.

The People's Square park, located in the heart of downtown Shanghai, is known for its proximity to other major landmarks in the city. Fuxing Park, located in the former French Concession, features formal French-style gardens and is surrounded by high-end bars and cafes. Lu Xun Park in Hongkou is named after writer Lu Xun, whose tomb is located within the park. Zhongshan Park, in western central Shanghai, contains a monument of Chopin, the tallest statue dedicated to the composer in the world. The park features sakura and peony gardens and a 150-year-old platanus.

Shanghai Botanical Garden is located 12 kilometres (7.5 mi) southwest of the city centre and established in 1978. In 2011, the largest botanical garden in Shanghai—Shanghai Chen Shan Botanical Garden—opened in Songjiang District. The Shanghai Disney Resort opened in 2016, featuring a castle that is the biggest among Disney's resorts.

=== Air pollution ===
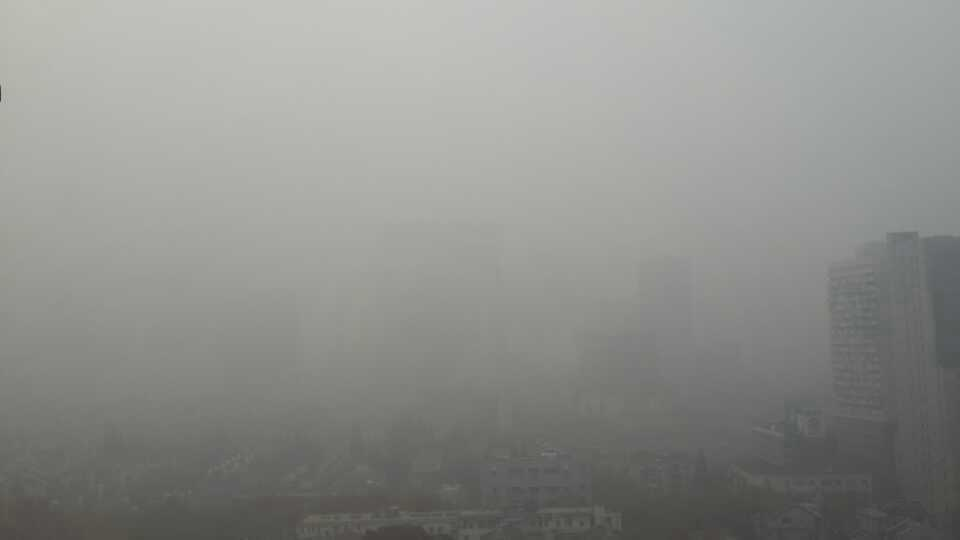
Huangpu District during the 2013 Eastern China smog

Air pollution in Shanghai is not as severe as in many other Chinese cities, but is still considered substantial by world standards. During the 2013 Eastern China smog, air pollution rates reached between 23 and 31 times the international standard. On 6 December 2013, levels of PM_{2.5} particulate matter in Shanghai rose above 600 micrograms per cubic meter and in the surrounding area, above 700 micrograms per cubic meter. Levels of PM_{2.5} in Putuo District reached 726 micrograms per cubic meter. The following month, Yang Xiong, the mayor of Shanghai, announced three measures to manage the air pollution in Shanghai: implementing the 2013 air-cleaning program, establishing a linkage mechanism with the three surrounding provinces, and improving the city's early-warning systems. That year, China's cabinet announced that a CN¥10 billion (US$1.7 billion) fund will be set up to help companies meet the new environmental standards. From 2013 to 2018, more than 3,000 treatment facilities for industrial waste gases were installed, and the city's annual smoke, nitrogen oxide, and sulfur dioxide emissions decreased by 65%, 54%, and 95%, respectively.

In 2023, the Air Quality Index (AQI) of Shanghai reached a rate of 87.7%, a 0.6% increase compared to the previous year. The annual average concentration of inhalable particulate matter (PM10) was 48 microgrammes per cubic meter, while the annual average concentration of fine particulate matter was 28 microgrammes per cubic meter.

=== Environmental protection ===
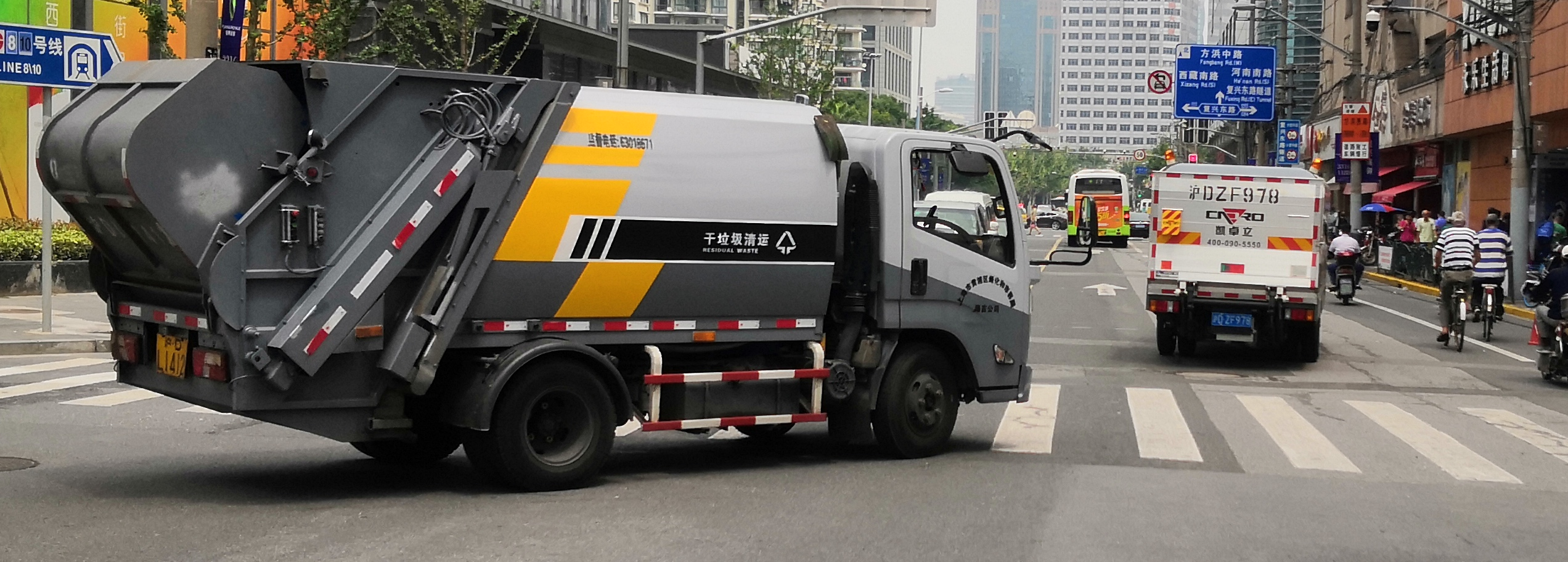
A residual waste truck and a kitchen waste truck in Huangpu

A 16-year rehabilitation of Suzhou Creek, which runs through the city, was finished in 2012, clearing the creek of barges and factories and removing 1.3 million cubic meters of sludge. The government has moved almost all the factories within the city centre to either the outskirts or other provinces. Shanghai once promoted the usage of liquefied petroleum gas vehicles, such as scooters and taxis, in the early 2000s; due to safety risks and lack of refuelling stations, these vehicles met limited success in the city.

On 1 July 2019, Shanghai adopted a new garbage-classification system that sorts waste into categories such as residual, kitchen, recyclable, and hazardous. The wastes are collected by separate vehicles and sent to incineration plants, landfills, recycling centres, and hazardous-waste-disposal facilities, respectively.

== Media ==
Cover of New Shanghai (新上海), a weekly periodical, issues 23–34 (May–September 1946).

Media in Shanghai covers newspapers, publishers, broadcast, television, and the Internet, with some media having influence over the country. Concerning foreign publications in Shanghai, Hartmut Walravens of the IFLA Newspapers Section said that when the Japanese controlled Shanghai in the 1940s "it was very difficult to publish good papers – one either had to concentrate on emigration problems, or cooperate like the Chronicle."

As of March 2020, newspapers publishing in Shanghai include:

- Jiefang Daily
- Oriental Sports Daily
- Shanghai Review of Books
- Shanghai Daily
- Shanghai Star
- Xinmin Evening News
- Wen Hui Bao
- Wenhui Book Review

Newspapers formerly published in Shanghai include:

- Der Ostasiatische Lloyd
- Deutsche Shanghai Zeitung
- Gelbe Post
- North China Daily News
- Shanghai Evening Post & Mercury
- The Shanghai Gazette
- Shanghai Jewish Chronicle
- Shanghai Herald
- The Shanghai Mercury
- The Shanghai Post
- Shanghai Times
- Shen Bao
- Israel's Messenger

The city's main broadcaster is Shanghai Media Group.

== International relations ==
The city is the seat of the New Development Bank, a multilateral development bank established by the BRICS states.

=== Twin towns – sister cities ===
Shanghai is twinned with 68 cities from the following 57 countries:

- Aden, Yemen (1995)
- Alexandria, Egypt (1992)
- Antwerp, Belgium (1984)
- Auvergne-Rhône-Alpes, France (2008)
- Bangkok, Thailand (2016)
- Barcelona, Spain (2001)
- Basel-Stadt, Switzerland (2007)
- Belgrade, Serbia (2018)
- Bratislava Region, Slovakia (2003)
- Budapest, Hungary (2013)
- Busan, South Korea (1993)
- Casablanca, Morocco (1986)
- Central Denmark Region, Denmark (2003)
- Chiang Mai, Thailand (2000)
- Chicago, United States (1985)
- Colombo, Sri Lanka (2003)
- Constanța, Romania (2002)
- (Republic of Ireland) Cork, Ireland (2005)
- Dubai, United Arab Emirates (2000)
- Dunedin, New Zealand (1994)
- East Java, Indonesia (2006)
- Espoo, Finland (1998)
- Guayaquil, Ecuador (2001)
- Haifa, Israel (1993)
- Hamburg, Germany (1986)
- Hamhung, North Korea (1982)
- Ho Chi Minh City, Vietnam (1994)
- Houston, United States (2015)
- Istanbul, Turkey (1989)
- Jakarta, Indonesia (2020)
- Jalisco, Mexico (1998)
- Karachi, Pakistan (1984)
- KwaZulu-Natal, South Africa (2001)
- Lima, Peru (2018)
- Liverpool, United Kingdom (1999)
- London, United Kingdom (2009)
- Maputo, Mozambique (1999)
- Marseille, France (1987)
- Melbourne, Australia
- Metro Manila, Philippines (1983)
- Milan, Italy (1979)
- Minsk, Belarus (2019)
- Montreal, Canada (2011)
- Mumbai, India (2014)
- New York City, United States (2013)
- Osaka, Japan (1974)
- Osaka Prefecture, Japan (1980)
- Oslo, Norway (2001)
- Phnom Penh, Cambodia (2008)
- Piraeus, Greece (1985)
- Pomeranian Voivodeship, Poland (1985)
- Port Vila, Vanuatu (1994)
- Porto, Portugal (1995)
- Queensland, Australia (1989)
- Rosario, Argentina (1997)
- Rotterdam, Netherlands (1979)
- Saint Petersburg, Russia (1988)
- Salzburg, Austria (2009)
- San Francisco, United States (1979)
- Santiago de Cuba, Cuba (1996)
- São Paulo, Brazil (1988)
- Sofia, Bulgaria (2016)
- Tabriz, Iran (2019)
- Tashkent, Uzbekistan (1994)
- Toronto, Canada (1985)
- Valparaíso, Chile (2001)
- Windhoek, Namibia (1995)
- Yokohama, Japan (1973)
- Zagreb, Croatia (1980)

=== Consulates and consulates general ===
As of September 2020, Shanghai hosts 71 consulates general and 5 consulates, excluding Hong Kong and Macao trade offices.

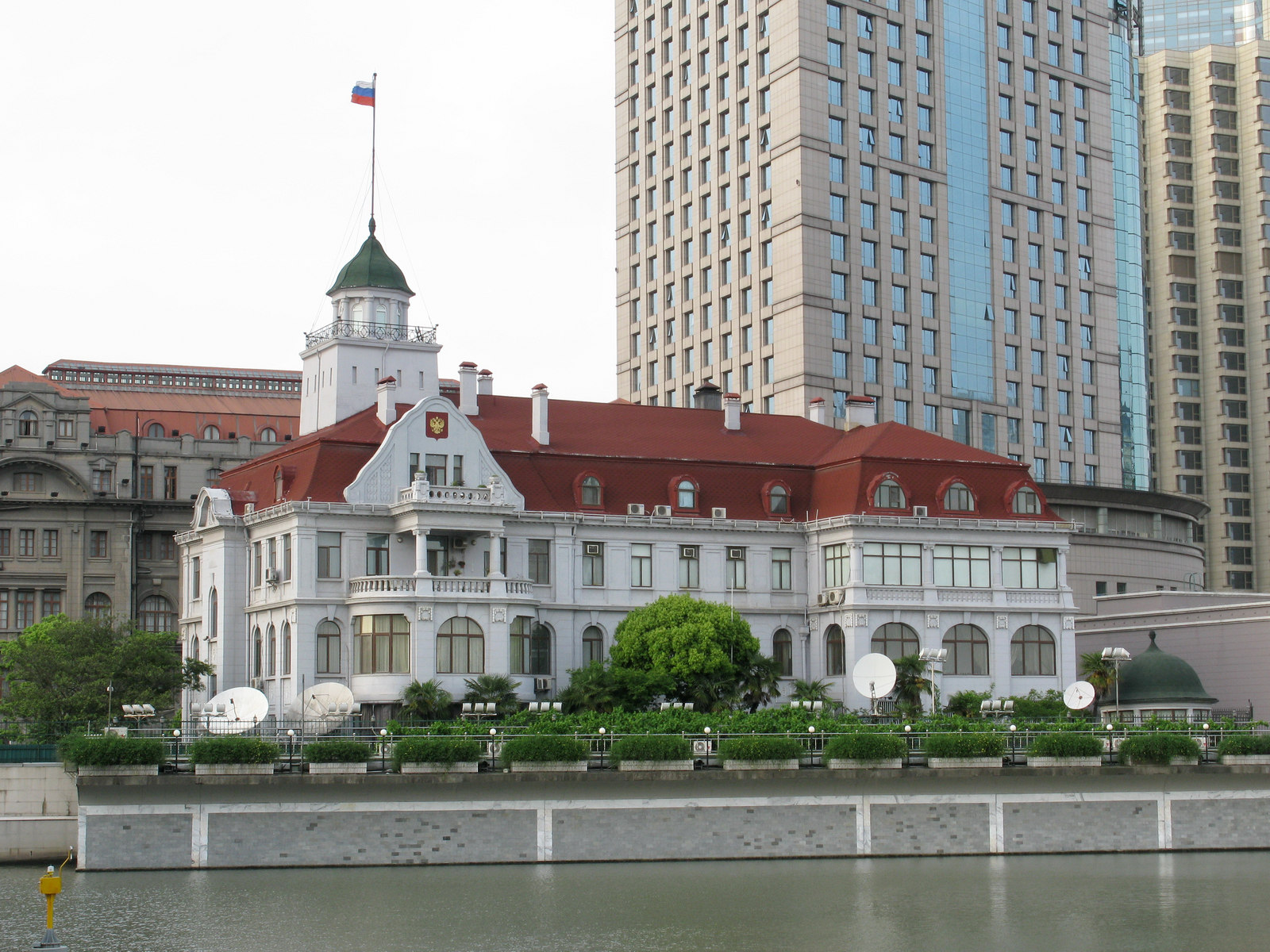
The Russian Consulate General in Shanghai, located on the banks of the Suzhou River

- Argentina
- Australia
- Austria
- Belarus
- Belgium
- Brazil
- Bulgaria
- Cambodia
- Canada
- Chile
- Colombia
- Costa Rica
- Cuba
- Czech Republic
- Denmark
- Ecuador
- Egypt
- Ethiopia
- Fiji
- Finland
- France
- Germany
- Greece
- Hungary
- India
- Indonesia
- Iran
- Ireland
- Israel
- Italy
- Japan
- Kazakhstan
- Laos
- Luxembourg
- Malaysia
- Maldives (Consulate)
- Malta
- Mexico
- Monaco (Consulate)
- Mongolia
- Nepal (Consulate)
- Netherlands
- New Zealand
- Nigeria
- Norway
- Pakistan
- Panama
- Papua New Guinea (Consulate)
- Peru
- Philippines
- Poland
- Portugal
- Romania
- Russia
- Serbia
- Seychelles
- Singapore
- Slovakia
- Slovenia (Consulate)
- South Africa
- South Korea
- Spain
- Sri Lanka
- Sweden
- Switzerland
- Thailand
- Turkey
- Ukraine
- United Arab Emirates
- United Kingdom
- United States
- Uruguay
- Uzbekistan
- Vanuatu
- Venezuela
- Vietnam

== See also ==
- List of economic and technological development zones in Shanghai
- List of administrative divisions of Shanghai
- List of fiction set in Shanghai
- List of films set in Shanghai
- List of people from Shanghai
- Shanghai Detention Center
- Shanghai International Football Tournament
- Shanghai Scientific and Technical Publishers
- Shuping Scholarship
- Urban planning in Shanghai
