= List of newspapers in China =

This is a list of newspapers in China. The number of newspapers in mainland China has increased from 42—virtually all Communist Party papers—in 1968 to 382 in 1980 and more than 2,200 today. In 2006, China was the largest market for daily newspapers, with 96.6m copies sold daily, followed by India with 78.7m, Japan with 69.7m, the US with 53.3m, and Germany with 21.5m. China newspaper advertisement revenues increased by 128% from 2001 to 2006.

Between 1950 and 2000, the number of Chinese newspapers increased nearly ten-fold. In 2004, over 400 kinds of daily newspapers were published in China, their circulation reaching 80 million, the highest figure of any country in the world. Targeted at different reader groups, newspaper formats are becoming increasingly diverse. Recent years have seen an important trend of newspaper reorganization in China. To date, 39 newspaper groups have been established in the country, such as Beijing Daily Newspaper Group, Wenhui Xinmin Associated Newspaper Group and Guangzhou Daily Newspaper Group.

In 2003, trans-regional cooperation among the print media became a new trend. The Beijing News, invested and run by Guangming Daily newspaper group and Nanfang Media Group, was the first to receive formal approval from the Chinese government to publish trans-regionally. Also Orient-Observation Weekly came out in Shanghai, its largest shareholder being the Beijing-based Xinhua News Agency.

== History ==
In 1987 China had three news agencies serving two regimes, the Central News Agency in Taiwan and the Xinhua News Agency along with China News Service (Zhongguo Xinwenshe) in the mainland. Central News Agency is the country's oldest news agency founded in 1928 in Guangzhou by the Nationalist government led by the Kuomintang which remains in existence in Taiwan. On the mainland, controlled by the Chinese Communist Party (CCP), Xinhua was the major source of news and photographs for central and local newspapers. The CCP's newspapers People's Daily and Enlightenment Daily (or Guangming Daily), and the People's Liberation Army's PLA Daily continued to have the largest circulation.

In addition to these major party and army organs, most professional and scientific organizations published newspapers or journals containing specialized information in fields as varied as astronomy and entomology.

Local morning and evening newspapers concentrating on news and feature stories about local people and events were extremely popular, selling out each day shortly after they arrived at the newsstands. In June 1981 the English-language China Daily began publication. This newspaper, which was provided for foreigners living or traveling in China but which also was read by a large number of Chinese literate in English, offered international news and sports from the major foreign wire services as well as interesting domestic news and feature articles.

Reference News, an official news organ that carried foreign news items in Chinese translation, was available to cadres and their families. In 1980 it enjoyed a circulation of 11 million, but, with the subsequent proliferation of other news sources, its circulation dropped to 4 million in 1985, causing the subscription policy to be changed to make it available to all Chinese. Another source of foreign reporting was Reference Information (Cankao Ziliao), a more restricted Chinese reprint of foreign reportage available only to middle- and upper-level cadres. Both of these publications often included foreign reports critical of China.

== List ==
=== National newspapers ===
- China Daily - English language national daily
- China Economic Daily - daily
- China Education Daily (Zhongguo Jiaoyu Bao)
- China News Digest (Hua Xia Wen Zhai) - independent online media run abroad
- China Public Security Daily - official public security bureau paper
- China Youth Daily (Zhongguo Qingnian Bao) - quasi-liberal daily; state-run, associated with the Communist Youth League of China
- Economic Information Daily
- The Economic Observer - classical liberal weekly; English edition website of the privately owned weekly newspaper
- Global Times - Chinese Communist Party aligned, tabloid with two language editions, - Chinese and English
- Gongren Ribao (Workers' Daily)
- Guangming Daily - conservative daily, close to the CCP
- Legal Daily (Fazhi Ribao) - supervised by the Ministry of Justice
- Nongmin Ribao (Farmers' Daily) - agricultural and rural issues
- People's Court Daily
- People's Daily (Renmin Ribao) - official daily of the CCP Central Committee
- PLA Daily (Jiefangjun Bao) - official daily of the People's Liberation Army
- Reference News - has the largest circulation in mainland China, published by Xinhua News Agency

=== Regional newspapers ===
==== Anhui ====
- Anhui Daily
- Hefei Wanbao

==== Beijing ====
- Beijing Daily
- Beijing Daily Messenger - prints 180,000 to 200,000 — 60,000 for subscribers; of the 120,000 retail copies, at least one-third is unsold
- Beijing Entertainment News
- Beijing Evening News - prints 700,000 copies — 450,000 for retail and 250,000 for subscribers; of the retail copies, 50,000 to 100,000 are unsold
- Beijing Globe
- Beijing Morning News - prints 180,000 — 130,000 are for subscribers; of the 50,000 retail copies, at least 20,000 are sold by the distribution center director as waste paper
- The Beijing News (Xin Jing Bao) - third best-selling daily in Beijing; newly launched daily with reformist ambitions, very liberal
- Beijing Portal
- Beijing Ribao
- Beijing Suburbs Daily
- Beijing Times (Jing Hua Shi Bao) - People's Daily-affiliated tabloid, centrist/liberal, second best-selling tabloid in the capital
- Beijing Today - an English weekly covering cultural events and embassy news published by the Beijing Youth Daily
- Beijing Youth Daily - fourth best-selling daily in the capital
- China Newsday - an English China news aggregation which covers political, environmental and economic discussion
- Freezing Point
- Legal Mirror (Fazhi Ribao)
- A Liar's Digest - a Beijing-based underground newspaper in mainland China, which pokes fun at the state-controlled media

==== Chongqing ====
- Chongqing Daily
- China High Tech
- Chongqing Evening News
- Chongqing Globe
- Chongqing News - Chinese, English
- Chongqing Today

==== Fujian ====
- Common Talk
- Fujian Ribao

==== Gansu ====
- Gansu Daily

==== Guangdong ====
- 21st Century Business Herald
- Dongguan Times
- Guangzhou Daily
- Guangzhou Metro Daily
- Guangzhou Morning Post
- Information Times
- Panyu Daily
- Shenzhen Daily - one of China's three English-language daily newspapers
- Shenzhen Dushi News
- Shenzhen Economic Daily
- Shenzhen Evening News
- Shenzhen Special Zone Daily
- Shenzhen Youth News
- Southern Daily
- Southern Metropolis Daily
- Southern Weekly
- Xin Kuai Bao
- Yangcheng Evening News
- Zhongshan Daily

==== Guangxi ====
- Guangxi Daily

==== Guizhou ====
- Guizhou Business Daily
- Guizhou Daily
- Guizhou Provincial
- Huaxi City Daily

==== Hainan ====
- Haikou Evening News
- Hainan Daily
- Nanguo Metropolis Daily

==== Hebei ====
- Hebei Daily - CCP official paper
- Hebei Youth Daily - tabloid covering Shijiazhuang, operated by Beijing Youth Daily
- Shijiazhuang Daily - CCP official paper
- Yanzhao Evening Post - tabloid covering Shijiazhuang, the capital of Hebei
- Yanzhao Metropolis Daily - tabloid covering Hebei and sold in 11 cities around Hebei Province

==== Heilongjiang ====
- Harbin Daily
- Heilongjiang Morning Post

==== Henan ====
- Henan Daily
- Dahe Newspaper
- Henan Business Daily
- Central Railway News
- Luoyang Daily

==== Hubei ====
- Changjiang Daily
- Chutian Metro Daily
- Hubei News
- Wuhan Evening News
- Wuhan Morning News
- Xianning Daily

==== Hunan ====
- Changsha Evening News - Chinese, English
- Hunan Daily
- Sanxiang Metro News
- Xiaoxiang Morning News

==== Inner Mongolia ====
- Hohhot Evening Post
- Hohhot Morning Post
- Hulunbeir Daily
- Inner Mongolia Daily
- Northern News Daily
- Northern Family Daily

==== Jiangsu ====
- Wuxi Daily - Wuxi
- Xinhua Daily
- Yangtse Evening Post - Nanjing
- Yangzhou Ribao
- Nanjing Morning Post

==== Jiangxi ====
- Information Daily
- Jiangnan newspaper
- Jiangxi Daily

==== Jilin ====
- China Jilin
- Jilin News
- Today New

==== Liaoning ====
- Dalian Daily
- Dalian Evening News
- Liaoning Daily
- Liaoning Farmer
- North Morning News
- Peninsula City News
- Peninsula Morning News
- Shenyang Wanbao
- Times Business Daily

==== Shaanxi ====
- Shaanxi Daily
- Sanqin Daily
- Chinese Business View
- Xi'an Daily
- Xi'an Evening News
- Sunshine Daily
- Tongchuan Daily
- Baoji Daily
- Xianyang Daily
- Weinan Daily

==== Shandong ====
- Dazhong Daily
- Jinan Daily
- Jinan Times - daily
- Life Daily - published by Shandong Dazhong Daily News Group
- Qilu Evening News - 1.2 million circulation; published by Shandong Dazhong Daily News Group
- Qingdao Daily
- Qingdao Globe
- Qingdao News

==== Shanghai ====
Newspaper	Location	First issued	Publisher	Languages	Website	Notes
Jiefang Daily (Liberation Daily)	Shanghai	1949	Shanghai United Media Group			Official daily of Shanghai Committee of the Chinese Communist Party
Shanghai Daily	Shanghai	1999	Shanghai United Media Group			Voice of the Shanghai People's Government
Shanghai Evening Post & Mercury	Shanghai	1929	Shanghai United Media Group			
Shanghai Morning Post	Shanghai	1999	Shanghai United Media Group			
Shanghai Post	Shanghai		Shanghai United Media Group			
Shanghai Star	Shanghai	1992-2006	China Daily			Weekly tabloid providing reports on people and issues in Shanghai and neighbouring regions
Oriental Morning Post	Shanghai		Shanghai United Media Group			
Wen Hui Bao	Shanghai	1938	Shanghai United Media Group			Not to be confused with Wen Wei Po, a newspaper with the same Chinese name published in Hong Kong
Wenhui Book Review	Shanghai	1985	Shanghai United Media Group			
Xinmin Evening News (Xinmin Wanbao)	Shanghai	1929	Shanghai United Media Group			
Youth Daily	Shanghai	1951	the Shanghai Committee of Communist Youth League of China			Not to be confused with China Youth Daily, a newspaper with a similar Chinese name published in Beijing by the Central Committee of the Communist Youth League of China

==== Shanxi ====
- Shanxi Daily

==== Sichuan ====
- Chengdu Economic Daily
- Sichuan Daily
- Trust Post

==== Tianjin ====
- Jin Wanbao
- Tianjin Ribao

==== Tibet ====
- Lasa Evening News
- Tibet Broadcast
- Tibet Daily

==== Xinjiang ====
- Qapqal News, the world's only Xibe-language newspaper
- Xinjiang Daily
- Xinjiang Economic Daily
- Xinjiang Newspaper

==== Yunnan ====
Name	Name in Chinese	Language	Location	Publisher	First issued	Website
Yunnan Daily	云南日报	Chinese	Kunming	Yunnan Daily Group	1950	yndaily.yunnan.cn
Chuncheng Evening News	春城晚报	Chinese	Kunming	Yunnan Daily Group	1980	ccwb.yunnan.cn
Yunnan Economic Daily	云南经济日报	Chinese	Kunming	Yunnan Daily Group	1984	jjrbpaper.yunnan.cn
Nations Times	民族时报	Chinese	Kunming	Yunnan Daily Group	1992	mzsb.yunnan.cn
Dianchi Morning News	滇池晨报	Chinese	Kunming	Yunnan Daily Group	1998	
Dianzhong New Area News	滇中新区报	Chinese	Kunming	Yunnan Daily Group	2015	www.cnepaper.com
Yunnan Tourism & Culture Times	云南旅游文化时报	Chinese; English	Kunming	Yunnan Daily Group	2016	
Yunnan Information	云南信息报	Chinese	Kunming	Yunnan Publishing Group; Nanfang Media Group	1985	www.ynxxb.com
Yunnan Legal System	云南法制报	Chinese	Kunming	Yunnan Legal System	1982	www.ynfzb.cn
Kunming Daily	昆明日报	Chinese	Kunming	Kunming Daily	1985	daily.clzg.cn
City Times	都市时报	Chinese	Kunming	City Times	1999	times.clzg.cn
~~Life News~~	~~生活新报~~	Chinese	Kunming	Life News	1989-2015	
Qujing Daily	曲靖日报	Chinese	Qujing	Qujing Daily	1985	epaper.qjrb.cn
Yuxi Daily	玉溪日报	Chinese	Yuxi	Yuxi Daily	1989	www.yxdaily.com
Baoshan Daily	保山日报	Chinese	Baoshan	Baoshan Daily	1985	paper.baoshandaily.com
Zhaotong Daily	昭通日报	Chinese	Zhaotong	Zhaotong Daily	1984	dubao.ztnews.net
Lijiang Daily	丽江日报	Chinese	Lijiang	Lijiang Daily	1989	www.ljrbw.com
Pu'er Daily	普洱日报	Chinese	Pu'er	Pu'er Daily	1979	www.perb.cn
Lincang Daily	临沧日报	Chinese	Lincang	Lincang Daily	1987	www.lcdaily.cn
Chuxiong Daily	楚雄日报	Chinese	Chuxiong	Chuxiong Daily	1976	www.cxdaily.com
Honghe Daily	红河日报	Chinese	Mengzi	Honghe Daily	1980	cnepaper.com/hhrb
Wenshan Daily	文山日报	Chinese	Wenshan	Wenshan Daily	1983	szb.wsnews.com.cn/wsrb
Qidu Evening Post	七都晚刊	Chinese	Wenshan	Wenshan Daily	2000	szb.wsnews.com.cn/qdwk
Xishuangbanna News	西双版纳报	Chinese; Tai Tham	Jinghong	Xishuangbanna News	1956	cnepaper.com/xsbnb
Dali Daily	大理日报	Chinese	Dali	Dali Daily	1981	www.dalidaily.com
Dehong Unity News	德宏团结报	Chinese; Tai Le; Jingpho (Latin); Lisu (Fraser); Zaiwa (Latin)	Mangshi	Dehong Unity News	1955	www.cnepaper.com/dhtjb
Pauk-Phaw	胞波	Burmese	Mangshi	Dehong Unity News	2015	www.dhtjb.com
Nujiang News	怒江报	Chinese; Lisu (Fraser)	Lushui	Nujiang News	1983	dzb.nujiang.cn
Diqing Daily	迪庆日报	Chinese; Tibetan	Shangri-La	Diqing Daily	1989	www.xgll.com.cn

==== Zhejiang ====
- Qianjiang Evening News
- Zhejiang Daily

=== Special administrative regions ===
==== Hong Kong ====
See Newspapers of Hong Kong

==== Macau ====
See Media of Macau

=== Business news ===
- 21st Century Business Herald - Southern Media Group publishes this paper Monday to Friday
- China Business - business weekly, published by the Chinese Academy of Social Sciences
- China Business News - first Chinese business daily, aims "to be the most influential, authoritative and respected financial daily newspaper in China
- China Economic Times (Zhongguo Jingji Shibao) - Chinese financial and economic information
- China Financial News - published in 1987, official newspaper of all Chinese major banks
- China Stock News - China's leading newspaper for stock market, provides much data for access
- Chinese Business View
- The Economic Observer - China's leading weekly for economy, politics, and culture; English edition of the privately owned weekly newspaper
- International Business Times (HK English)
- National Business Daily - publishes eight pages apiece on domestic and international business news
- Xinhua Business Weekly - an English newsletter published weekly by Xinhua News Agency

=== Information technology news ===
- China Information World - published for 20 years; offers all IT information
- China PC News - covers Chinese IT news, consumer news, PC services, software and hardware
- IT Business Information - mainly provides software solutions to both buyers and sellers
- IT Management - news centre for IT manager, project manager, CIO etc.
- PC Professional China - computer technical discussion zone newspaper, also offers a buyers' guide
- PC World - provides IT resources to enterprise, downloads, IT blog, and other technical journals
- Programming and Maintenance - covers topics from programming to PC maintenance

=== Sports news ===
- Oriental Sports Daily - a city newspaper from Shanghai, which focuses on Shanghai and surrounding cities's football events
- Soccer News - dedicated to Chinese soccer fans, reports national and international soccer news
- Sports China - covers sports news for every sports events, includes Chinese martial arts
- Titan Sports - China's most successful sports bi-weekly newspaper; it started as a weekly newspaper with focus on world soccer news, then expanded to Chinese soccer news, especially with China's first participation in the final phase of World Cup (2002). It has conquered and kept more than 80% of printed sports media market-share with its filial magazines such as Soccer Weekly, Golf Digest China, Slam China, Runners' World China, etc.

=== Defunct newspapers ===
- Wan guo gong bao - monthly newspaper published by Methodist missionaries from 1868 to 1907
- Central Daily News – published by the Kuomintang from 1928 to 2006.
- The Crystal, two-page tabloid published in Shanghai from 1919 to 1940
- Xinwen Bao, published in Shanghai from 1893 to 1949

== See also ==
- List of magazines in China
- History of newspapers and magazines § China
- Chinese tabloid
- Media in the People's Republic of China
- Communications in the People's Republic of China
- List of non-English-language newspapers in New South Wales#Chinese language newspapers
