= Newspapers and journals of the Chinese Communist Party =

The Chinese Communist Party (CCP) and its bodies publish a variety of newspapers and periodicals. The main party newspaper of the Central Committee of the Chinese Communist Party is the People's Daily, and the party's theoretical periodical is Qiushi. In addition, the provincial, prefectural and county party committees of the CCP all publish party newspapers.

== Party newspapers ==
=== Central level ===
Name	Level	Notes
People's Daily	Ministerial level	The official newspaper of the Central Committee of the Chinese Communist Party
Guangming Daily	Vice Minister	Sponsored by the CCP Central Committee, formerly the official newspaper of the democratic parties
Economic Daily	Vice Minister	Directed by the Publicity Department
People's Liberation Army Daily		The official newspaper of the Central Military Commission of the Chinese Communist Party

=== Provincial level ===
Except for Shanghai, Guangdong, Jiangsu and Shandong, the newspapers are named in the form of "place name + daily newspaper".

Name	Location	Owner	Notes
Beijing Daily	Beijing	Beijing Municipal Committee of the Chinese Communist Party	
Jiefang Daily	Shanghai	Shanghai Municipal Committee of the Chinese Communist Party	Reorganized from the former party newspaper New China Daily.
Tianjin Daily	Tianjin	Tianjin Municipal Committee of the Chinese Communist Party	
Chongqing Daily	Chongqing	Chongqing Municipal Committee of the Chinese Communist Party	
Anhui Daily	Anhui	Anhui Provincial Committee of the Chinese Communist Party	
Fujian Daily	Fujian	Fujian Provincial Committee of the Chinese Communist Party	
Gansu Daily	Gansu	Gansu Provincial Committee of the Chinese Communist Party	
Nanfang Daily	Guangdong	Guangdong Provincial Committee of the Chinese Communist Party	The provincial party newspaper with the largest circulation
Guangxi Daily	Guangxi	Guangxi Zhuang Autonomous Regional Committee of the Chinese Communist Party	
Guizhou Daily	Guizhou	Guizhou Provincial Committee of the Chinese Communist Party	
Hainan Daily	Hainan	Hainan Provincial Committee of the Chinese Communist Party	
Hebei Daily	Hebei	Hebei Provincial Committee of the Chinese Communist Party	
Henan Daily	Henan	Henan Provincial Committee of the Chinese Communist Party	
Heilongjiang Daily	Heilongjiang	Heilongjiang Provincial Committee of the Chinese Communist Party	
Hubei Daily	Hubei	Hubei Provincial Committee of the Chinese Communist Party	
Hunan Daily	Hunan	Hunan Provincial Committee of the Chinese Communist Party	
Jilin Daily	Jilin	Jilin Provincial Committee of the Chinese Communist Party	
Xinhua Daily	Jiangsu	Jiangsu Provincial Committee of the Chinese Communist Party	The only party newspaper published in the Kuomintang-controlled areas during the Nationalist government period, it was once the official newspaper of the Sichuan Provincial Committee and the North China Bureau of the Chinese Communist Party.
Jiangxi Daily	Jiangxi	Jiangxi Provincial Committee of the Chinese Communist Party	
Liaoning Daily	Liaoning	Liaoning Provincial Committee of the Chinese Communist Party	
Inner Mongolia Daily	Inner Mongolia	Inner Mongolia Autonomous Regional Committee of the Chinese Communist Party	
Ningxia Daily	Ningxia	Ningxia Hui Autonomous Regional Committee of the Chinese Communist Party	
Qinghai Daily	Qinghai	Qinghai Provincial Committee of the Chinese Communist Party	
Dazhong Daily	Shandong	Shandong Provincial Committee of the Chinese Communist Party	The oldest CCP newspaper
Shanxi Daily	Shanxi	Shanxi Provincial Committee of the Chinese Communist Party	
Shaanxi Daily	Shaanxi	Shaanxi Provincial Committee of the Chinese Communist Party	
Sichuan Daily	Sichuan	Sichuan Provincial Committee of the Chinese Communist Party	
Tibet Daily	Tibet	Tibet Autonomous Regional Committee of the Chinese Communist Party	
Xinjiang Daily	Xinjiang	Xinjiang Uyghur Autonomous Regional Committee of the Chinese Communist Party	
Yunnan Daily	Yunnan	Yunnan Provincial Committee of the Chinese Communist Party	
Zhejiang Daily	Zhejiang	Zhejiang Provincial Committee of the Chinese Communist Party	

== Party journals ==
=== Theory ===
- Qiushi: the official publication of the Central Committee of the Chinese Communist Party.

=== Political news ===
- Party Building: supervised and hosted by the Publicity Department of the CCP Central Committee.
- Party Building Research: supervised and hosted by the Organization Department of the CCP Central Committee.
- China News Release: Sponsored by the Publicity Department of the CCP Central Committee.
- Global People: supervised and hosted by People's Daily.

=== Party history ===
- Party Documents: supervised and hosted by the Institute of Party History and Literature.
- Research on the History of the Chinese Communist Party: supervised and hosted by the Institute of Party History and Literature.
- A Century Tide: Under the supervision of the Institute of Party History and Literature, and hosted by the Chinese Communist Party History Society and the Communist Party History Press.

== Former ==
- New Youth was originally an enlightenment magazine, but with the development of the New Culture Movement, it gradually became the party publication of the Chinese Communist Party.
- Red Flag was the official publication of the Central Committee of the Chinese Communist Party from 1958 to 1988.
