= Dahe =

Dahe may refer to:

- Dahé, arrondissement in the Mono department of Benin
- Dahe Glacier, a glacier in the Saint Johns Range, Victoria Land, Antarctica
- Dahe Daily, newspaper based in Henan, China

== Places in China ==
=== Towns ===
- Dahe, Liupanshui (大河), town in Liupanshui, Guizhou
- Dahe, Sandu County (大河), town in Sandu Shui Autonomous County, Guizhou
- Dahe, Tongzi County (大河), town in Tongzi County, Guizhou
- Dahe, Shijiazhuang, town in Shijiazhuang, Hebei
- Dahe, Rongcheng County (大河), town in Rongcheng County, Hebei
- Dahe, Henan (大河), town in Tongbai County, Henan
- Dahe, Huangmei County (大河), town in Huangmei County, Hubei
- Dahe, Laifeng County (大河), town in Laifeng County, Hubei
- Dahe, Ankang (大河), town in Ankang, Shaanxi
- Dahe, Xixiang County (大河), town in Xixiang County, Shaanxi
- Dahe, Nanbu County (大河), town in Nanbu County, Sichuan
- Dahe, Nanjiang County (大河), town in Nanjiang County, Sichuan
- Dahe, Xinjiang (大河), town in Barköl Kazakh Autonomous County, Xinjiang
- Dahe, Yunnan (大河), town in Fuyuan County, Yunnan

=== Townships ===
- Dahe Township, Chongqing (大河乡), township in Wuxi County, Chongqing
- Dahe Township, Gansu (大河乡), township in Sunan Yugur Autonomous County, Gansu
- Dahe Township, Guangxi (大河乡), township in Guilin, Guangxi
- Dahe Township, Bijie (大河乡), township in Bijie, Guizhou
- Dahe Township, Zhangbei County (大河乡), township in Zhangbei County, Hebei
- Dahe Township, Bazhong (大和乡), township in Bazhong, Sichuan
- Dahe Township, Wangcang County (大河乡), township in Wangcang County, Sichuan
- Dahe Township, Yanyuan County (大河乡), township in Yanyuan County, Sichuan

== Historical eras ==
- Dahe (大和, 827–835), era name used by Emperor Wenzong of Tang
- Dahe (大和, 929–935), era name used by Yang Pu, emperor of Wu
