= Titan Sports =

Titan Sports may refer to:

- Titan Sports, Inc., former name of WWE
- Titan Sports (newspaper), Chinese newspaper
- Titan Sports Media Group, sports media group in China
