= Wang Keqin =

Chinese journalist

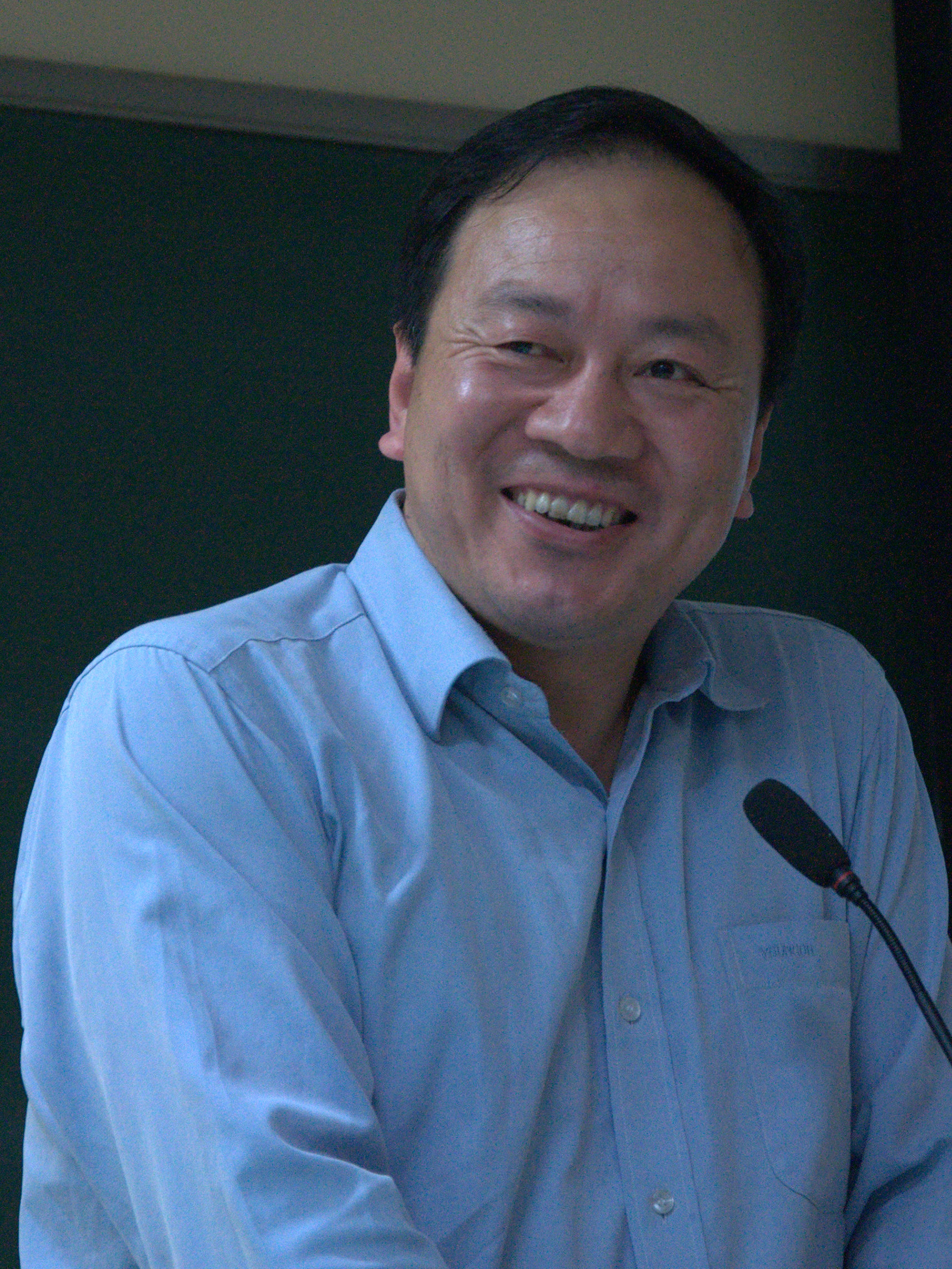
- Wang Keqin
- Born: November 14, 1964 (age 62); Yongdeng County, Gansu, China
- Occupations: Muckraking journalist and professor
- Years active: Mid-1980s–present
- Website: Blog (Chinese)

Wang Keqin (Chinese: 王克勤; pinyin: Wáng Kèqín, born November 14, 1964) is a Chinese muckraking reporter, founder of charity Da Ai Qing Chen or Love Save Pneumoconiosis and blogger. He is also a professor at Peking University in Beijing.

== Early life ==
Wang was born in the Yongdeng County in the Gansu Province of the People's Republic of China. Before becoming a reporter, Wang was a farmer in Gansu. It was here where he discovered journalism in the mid-80s. He received about CN¥2.6 (€.3, or approximately US$.39) for each article he wrote, or as he said, enough for six bowls of noodles. He began by writing propaganda stories for the local media. In 1989 he began working for the Gansu Economics Daily. After publishing his story that uncovered a fraudulent securities company, he was hired by the Beijing-based China Economic Times, where he worked as chief reporter until forced to resign in 2011 following the vaccines story.

== Journalism ==
Wang is known for carrying a small box containing a sponge soaked in red ink, which he uses to collect fingerprints from witnesses to confirm their agreement on the witness statements he compiles. "You have to make the evidence iron-cast," he explains. In 2002, Wang published a story exposing the "stranglehold" that Chinese taxi companies have on their drivers. This influenced Premier Wen Jiabao to order a cleanup of the taxi industry. On November 30, 2005, Wang published a story about an AIDS epidemic in the Henan province caused by poor sterilization of needles when collecting paid blood donations. On March 8, 2010, he and a student were physically and verbally attacked while trying to visit Yuan Weijing, wife of imprisoned civil and political rights activist Chen Guangcheng. As a result, Reporters Without Borders urged the Shandong provincial government to investigate the incident and stop it from reoccurring with other visitors.

=== Securities fraud story ===
On February 3, 2001, Wang published in the Gansu Economics Daily a "groundbreaking" report uncovering a huckster securities company that had defrauded customers of millions of dollars. The company had committed securities fraud by displaying stock tickers and computer screens with the names of real companies but with fake investment returns. On April 29 of the same year, the paper was closed down by the provincial publicity department because of this story. When the paper was allowed to reopen four months later, local officials told Wang that he was no longer allowed to work there. However, China Economic Times picked up the story and subsequently offered Wang a job as a senior reporter in January 2002. Publishing this story resulted in threats to both Wang and his family from the local mafia running the scam; he is sometimes referred to as "China's most expensive reporter" because of the $600,000 price put on his head. An internal report on his work from the Xinhua News Agency reached the Premier of the People's Republic of China at the time, Zhu Rongji, who ordered police protection for Wang and his family and brought Wang to Beijing so he could continue his journalism.

=== Vaccines story ===
On March 17, 2010, after six months of investigation, Wang published a story in China Economic Times exposing how a "gross failure" to refrigerate vaccines in the Shanxi province caused four children to die and 74 others to become ill. He reported that the vaccines were deliberately left unrefrigerated in order to stop the labels from peeling off. Shanxi officials claimed that Wang's story was incorrect, and within hours of publication, the report had been downplayed on other media outlets following orders from the Propaganda Department of the Chinese Communist Party. The chief editor, publisher, and Chinese Communist Party Committee Secretary of China Economic Times, Bao Yueyang, was fired after defending the report, and moved to a minor sister company. Wang was later warned that his life may be in danger if he returned to the Shanxi province.

== Suppression ==
Wang has been forced to resign twice from major Chinese newspapers, from China Economic Times in 2011 and from The Economic Observer in February 2013.
