= Shanghai Star (disambiguation) =

The Shanghai Star was a weekly English-language newspaper published in Shanghai, China between 1992 and 2006.

Shanghai Star may also refer to:

- Shanghai Star, a proposed Ferris wheel project that was cancelled in 2006
- Shanghai Star, a Casula Powerhouse Arts Centre project
