= Henan Daily =

Chinese Communist Party newspaper

- Native name: 河南日报
- Type: Daily newspaper
- Owner: Henan Daily Press Group
- Founded: 1949-6-1
- Political alignment: Chinese Communist Party
- Language: Simplified Chinese
- Headquarters: No. 28, East Section of Nongye Road, Zhengzhou City, Henan Province
- Website: newpaper.dahe.cn/hnrb/

The Henan Daily (simplified Chinese: 河南日报; traditional Chinese: 河南日報; pinyin: Hénán Rìbào), or Henan Ribao in Pinyin, is the official newspaper of the Henan Provincial Committee of the Chinese Communist Party. It was founded on June 1, 1949, with the title written by Mao Zedong. Henan Daily is the most authoritative daily newspaper in Henan, China. It is a member of the Henan Daily Press Group.

== History ==
On June 1, 1949, Henan Daily was established by merging Yuxi Daily to the Kaifeng Daily in Kaifeng, as the official newspaper of the Henan Provincial Committee of the Chinese Communist Party, with the Chinese title written by Mao Zedong.

In 1954, the Henan Daily editorial office moved from Kaifeng to Zhengzhou, the new provincial capital.

In 1963, the first subsidiary newspaper of Henan Daily, the Henan Daily Farmers' Edition, was officially launched.

In 1985, the first issue of the "Cartoon Monthly" sponsored by Henan Daily was published.

In 1995, Dahe Daily, a comprehensive urban lifestyle daily newspaper, was founded by Henan Daily.

In 2000, the Henan Daily Press Group was established. And Henan Daily became a member of it.

In 2018, Henan Daily was selected for the 2017 list of the top 100 newspapers in China.

== Present situation ==
Currently Henan Daily is a member of the Henan Daily Press Group. It is the most authoritative and guiding newspaper in Henan Province. Henan Daily has twelve pages with a daily circulation of 540,000 copies. The newspaper has formed a comprehensive media system covering print media, online media, mobile media, and outdoor media.

Henan Daily has been in the top ten provincial dailies in China for years running.

== See also ==
- List of newspapers in China
- Dahe Newspaper
- Henan Business Daily
