= Americans Are Robbers =

Chinese children's song

"美国佬是强盗"

Song
- Language: Mandarin Chinese
- English title: Americans Are Robbers
- Genre: Children's music, revolutionary song

"Americans Are Robbers" (Chinese: 美国佬是强盗; pinyin: měiguó lǎo shì qiángdào), also translated as "Yankees Are Robbers" or "The Americans Are Bandits", is an anti-American children's song from the People's Republic of China in the 1960s. The full title of the song is "Down with the Imperialist American Robber King" (Chinese: 打倒美帝國主義強盜王; pinyin: dǎdǎo měi dìguó zhǔyì qiángdào wáng).

== History ==
During the second half of the 20th century, the PRC government promoted anti-American sentiment among children amid Cold War tensions and ideological differences between the People's Republic of China and the United States. According to the Economic Daily, the song was created in mainland China during the 1960s, and was commonly used in schools and in the Young Pioneers. It was first performed by the Red Youth Choir of the Beijing Chongwen District Youth Center, after which similar performances and dances spread nationwide. In the 1970s, following the easing of relations between China and the United States and the Sino-American rapprochement, the song gradually disappeared from public use.

In early 2026, following the US attack on Venezuela in January 2026 and the US–Israeli airstrikes on Iran in February 2026, the song resurfaced on Chinese online platforms and social media. It also spread internationally, with some internet users producing versions in different languages as a form of satire directed at the United States.

On March 4, 2026, the official Weibo account of the embassy of Iran in China posted the song as a form of protest against the U.S. airstrikes on Iran.

== Lyrics ==
Simplified Chinese
Pinyin above characters

美国佬(Měiguó lǎo)是(shì)强盗(qiángdào)。

脸上(Liǎn shàng)笑嘻嘻(xiàoxīxī)，
背后(bèihòu)挂(guà)大刀(dàdāo)。

见了(Jiànle)好东西(hǎo dōngxī)，
什么(shénme)都(dōu)想要(xiǎng yào)。

要不到(Yào bù dào)他(tā)就(jiù)抢(qiǎng)，
霸了(bàle)土地(tǔdì)占了(zhànle)房子(fángzi)。

杀人(Shārén)放火(fànghuǒ)样样(yàngyàng)干(gàn)，
他的(tā de)野心(yěxīn)比(bǐ)天(tiān)大(dà)，
想(xiǎng)拖住(tuō zhù)那(nà)地球(dìqiú)往(wǎng)家里(jiālǐ)搬(bān)。

全世界(Quán shìjiè)的(de)小朋友(xiǎopéngyǒu)，
要(yào)勇敢(yǒnggǎn)，
不管(bùguǎn)他(tā)有(yǒu)多么(duōme)凶(xiōng)，
我们(wǒmen)的(de)力量(lìliàng)比(bǐ)他(tā)强(qiáng)。

大家(Dàjiā)齐心(qíxīn)团结(tuánjié)紧(jǐn)，
打倒(dǎdǎo)美帝国主义(měi dìguó zhǔyì)强盗王(qiángdào wáng)。

English translation

Americans are robbers.

With smiling faces,
They carry knives behind their backs.

When they see good things,
They want them all.

If they cannot get them, they snatch them,
Seizing the land and taking the houses.

They commit every atrocity from murder to arson,
Their ambition is boundless,
Wanting to drag the Earth itself into their homes.

Children of the world,
Be brave,
No matter how fierce they are,
Our strength is greater than theirs.

Let us unite together,
To defeat the imperialist American bandit king.
