= Study Press =

Chinese state-owned publisher

Study Press (Chinese: 学习出版社) is a Chinese publisher. It was founded in 1993. The publisher was listed as among the National Top 100 Publications.
