= Changsha Evening News =

Newspaper in Changsha, Hunan, China

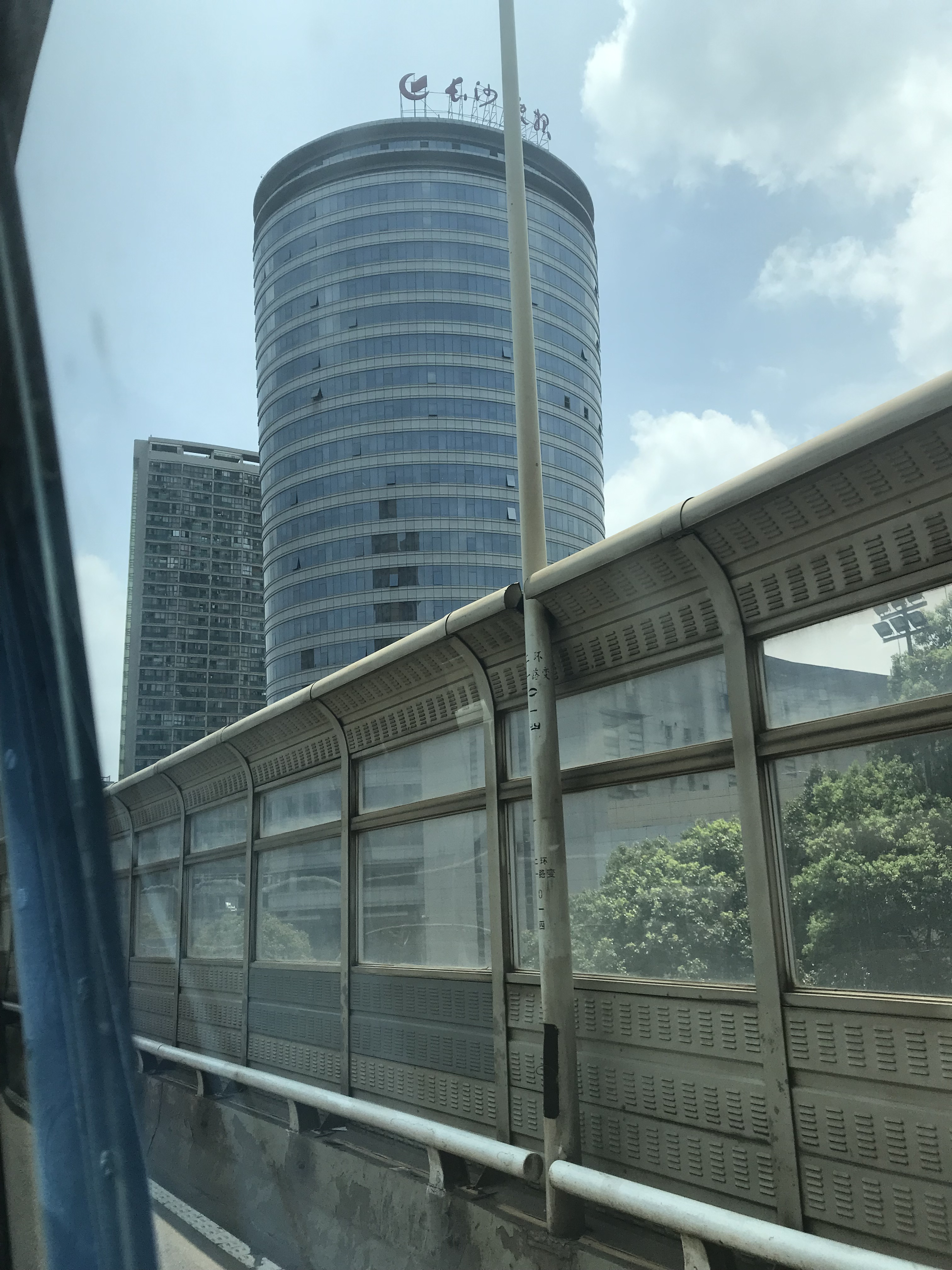
- Changsha Evening News Newspaper Building in 2019
- Type: Daily
- Format: Broadsheet
- Owner: Changsha Evening Newspaper Group
- Publisher: Changsha Evening Newspaper Group
- Founded: 1 July, 1956; 70 years ago
- Language: Simplified Chinese
- Headquarters: No. 267, Wanbao Avenue, Furong District, Changsha.
- Circulation: 5 million copies
- OCLC number: 947815390
- Website: www.icswb.com

Changsha Evening News (Chinese: 长沙晚报 pinyin:Zhǎngshā wǎnbào) is a municipal newspaper based in Changsha, Hunan, China. It was founded by Changsha Evening News Press Group on July 1, 1956. It is a 24-page broadsheet newspaper. It became the first newspaper in Hunan Province to use double-sided color printing in August 2004. To promote media integration, it has become a "resource sharing" for media creative products and technological innovation and upgrading.

== History ==
On April 25, 1956, the Changsha Evening News published its first photo of Changsha. It was founded on July 1, 1956, originally called Changsha Daily. In January 1961, "Changsha Daily" was changed to "Changsha Evening News". It was interrupted during the Cultural Revolution. In 1978, "Changsha Evening News" was republished as "Changsha Daily", and on October 1, 1981, the name of "Changsha Evening News" was restored again. On June 30, 2003, the newspaper named the K517/518 train from Changsha to Shenzhen (now the K9017/9018 train) as the "Changsha Evening News". This is the first time that Hunan Media has named a transportation vehicle.

== See also ==
- List of magazines in China
- List of newspapers in China
- History of newspapers and magazines#China
- Chinese tabloid
- Media in the People's Republic of China
