= Strait Metropolitan Post =

Chinese Communist Party newspaper

- Type: Daily newspaper
- Owner(s): Fujian Daily Press Group
- Founded: October 1, 1997
- Political alignment: Chinese Communist Party
- Headquarters: Fuzhou
- OCLC number: 123255810
- Website: www.hxnews.com

Strait Metropolitan Post (海峡都市报; 海峽都市報), or Strait Metropolis Daily, officially transliterated as Strait News, is a Fuzhou-based daily newspaper, officially launched on October 1, 1997. It is published by the Fujian Daily Office (福建日报社), and owned by Fujian Daily Press Group, an organization under the control of the Fujian Provincial Committee of the Chinese Communist Party.

In 1998, Strait Metropolitan Post - Southern Fujian Version was launched.

== See also ==
- List of newspapers in China
