= Hangzhou Cultural Radio and Television Group =

Chinese media organisation

- Company type: Institutions, state-owned enterprises
- Industry: Culture, media
- Predecessor: Hangzhou Radio and Television Group; Hangzhou Cultural Development Investment Company Limited
- Founded: January 2005
- Headquarters: Broadcasting Center Building, No. 888 Zhijiang Road, Shangcheng District, Hangzhou, Zhejiang Province, People's Republic of China
- Products: Radio and television, cultural performances, cable networks
- Website: www.hcrt.cn

Hangzhou Cultural Radio and Television Group (also known as Hangzhou Radio and Television Station under the model of one institution, two brands), referred to as the Hangzhou Culture and Broadcasting Group, was established in January 2005 through the merger of the former Hangzhou Radio and Television Group and Hangzhou Cultural Development Investment Company Limited. It is a comprehensive cultural media organisation under the People's Government of Hangzhou Municipal, integrating broadcasting, television, cultural and performing arts, cable network operations, and other services.

The group is headquartered in Hangzhou, Zhejiang, at No. 888, Zhijiang Road. It employs more than 3,000 people and holds fixed assets valued in the billions of RMB.

== General situation ==
On September 28, 2002, the Hangzhou Radio and Television Group was established, becoming the first radio and television group in a sub-provincial city in mainland China. It operated under the one institution, two brands model together with the Hangzhou Radio and Television Bureau.

In January 2005, as part of the national pilot programme for cultural system reform, the Hangzhou Municipal Committee of the Chinese Communist Party and the People's Government of Hangzhou Municipal implemented the principle of separating government administration from management and operations. Under this reform, the Hangzhou Municipal Radio and Television Bureau was separated from the Hangzhou Radio and Television Group. At the same time, the Hangzhou Radio and Television Group merged with Hangzhou Cultural Development Investment Company Limited, resulting in the establishment of the Hangzhou Cultural Radio and Television Group and its corporate entity, Hangzhou Cultural Radio and Television Group Co.

The Hangzhou Cultural Radio and Television Group is a public institution operating under enterprise-style management. It manages five television channels, three radio frequencies, ten media outlets (including Radio & TV Weekly), eight art troupes, and around 30 holding, shareholding, and wholly owned companies. It also oversees cultural institutions such as the Hangzhou Grand Theatre, Xiling Calligraphy and Painting Institute, and the Hangzhou Cultural Center.

The group broadcasts 8 1/2 hours of prime time television news and 15 hours of radio news daily.

== TV service ==
Hangzhou TV is the unified call sign of the television channels operated by Hangzhou Media Group. It began broadcasting on February 1, 1984. In June 2001, Hangzhou Cable TV and Hangzhou TV merged to form Hangzhou TV. Following the establishment of the Hangzhou Broadcasting and Television Group on September 28, 2002, the organisation was restructured, but the original "Hangzhou TV" call sign was retained.

=== History ===
In May 1983, the CPC Hangzhou Municipal Committee and the People's Government of Hangzhou Municipal decided to establish Hangzhou TV. Approval was granted in July of the same year by the Ministry of Radio, Film and Television of the People's Republic of China. Broadcasting began on Channel 11 using a temporary transmitter built on the eastern slope of Wushan, with a tower 48 metres high at an altitude of 40 metres.

Hangzhou TV officially launched on January 31, 1984. Initially limited by personnel and technology, it mainly rebroadcast programmes from Shanghai TV. By December 1984, it began relaying Channel 8 of Shanghai TV through a microwave link and gradually started its own programming. In September 1986, Hangzhou TV ended the rebroadcasting of Shanghai TV and launched five and a half hours of original daily programming. It was originally co-located with the Hangzhou Radio and Television Bureau and became independent in 1985.

On November 12, 1990, Hangzhou TV launched a second channel on Channel 41, initially relaying China Central Television (CCTV) content. On April 24, 1993, this channel was rebranded as "Xihu Mingzhu Television" (now the Westlake Pearl Channel).

Hangzhou Cable TV was established on June 28, 1991, and trial broadcasts began on December 31, 1991, covering five districts of Chaohui. It officially launched on May 22, 1993. It was the first cable television station in a provincial capital city approved by the Ministry of Broadcasting, Film and Television, and the first in mainland China to broadcast 24 hours a day. By 1994, it offered 22 channels and 23 sets of programmes. In June 1995, Hangzhou Cable TV and Hangzhou TV were formally separated under a "one institution, two brands" model.

On August 18, 1999, the CPC Hangzhou Municipal Committee and the General Office of the Hangzhou Municipal People's Government created the Hangzhou Cable Broadcasting and Television Network Center (the predecessor of WASU), which unified cable network planning, construction, operation, and transmission. Hangzhou Cable TV was thereafter limited to programme production and broadcasting. The Hangzhou Municipal Radio and Television Bureau abolished the institutional identities of Hangzhou TV and Hangzhou Cable TV but retained the broadcasting call sign.

In June 2001, with approval from the State Administration of Radio, Film and Television and the Zhejiang Provincial Bureau of Radio, Film and Television, Hangzhou Cable TV and Hangzhou TV formally merged. On July 1, 2001, Hangzhou TV launched a new logo, "Three Pools and the Indian Moon", and retired the previous logos of both stations.

=== Channel list ===
==== Available channels ====
Channel	Language	Broadcast format	Launch date	Slogan	Predecessor	Notes
General Channel	Mandarin, English	SD: PAL 576i 4:3; HD: 1080i 16:9	1984	–	Hangzhou TV (main frequency), Hangzhou TV Channel 11	First Hangzhou TV channel, launched in June 1984. Focuses on news and current affairs with supplementary dramas and information programmes.
Westlake Pearl Channel	Mandarin, Hangzhou dialect	SD: PAL 576i 4:3; HD: 1080i 16:9	April 24, 1993	"The most beautiful is the West Lake, the best-looking is in the Pearl"	Westlake Pearl TV	Comprehensive channel with news, variety, culture, and drama. Launched a website in 1997, the first for a city TV station in China.
Life Channel	Mandarin, Hangzhou dialect	SD: PAL 576i 4:3; HD: 1080i 16:9	1993	"The Life Channel, the most flavorful"	Hangzhou Cable TV, Hangzhou Cable Variety Channel	Lifestyle-focused channel with daily programming.
Movie Channel	Mandarin	SD: PAL 576i 4:3; HD: 1080i 16:9	1994	"Youthful creativity"	Hangzhou Cable Movie and Sports Channel; Hangzhou Women's Channel; Hangzhou Cable Movie Channel	Primarily films and dramas, with additional content on entrepreneurship, health, and news.
Youth–Sports Channel	Mandarin	SD: PAL 576i 4:3; HD: 1080i 16:9	2002	–	Hangzhou TV Entertainment Channel; Hangzhou TV Children's Channel	Renamed Youth–Sports Channel in 2004. Airs children's, family, and sports content. Temporarily rebranded as the "Asian Games Channel" in 2020.
Culture Channel	Mandarin	SD: PAL 576i 4:3; HD: 1080i 16:9	1998	–	Xihu Cable TV; Hangzhou Cable TV; Hangzhou TV Guide–Record Channel	Renamed multiple times; current name adopted in 2016. Specialises in cultural programming.
Real Estate Channel	Mandarin	SD: PAL 576i 4:3	2008	–	–	Broadcasts real estate-related programming on Hangzhou Huazhou Channel 66.
Seekers Records Channel	Mandarin	UHDTV (4K 16:9)	2014	–	–	Operated jointly by China Digital Group and Discovery Communications. Broadcasts HD documentaries, and became mainland China's first 4K pay channel in 2020.

==== Discontinued channels ====
- Stereo HD Trial Channel
- Xihu TV: Co-organised with Tibet TV. Trial broadcasts began on March 1, 1998, with an official launch on June 15, 1998. It mainly aired news, features, self-produced columns, and dramas from Hangzhou TV Channel 11, Westlake Pearl, and Hangzhou Cable TV. The channel has since ceased broadcasting.

=== Main programmes ===
==== Comprehensive Channel ====
- Hangzhou News Broadcast: the channel's main news programme, covering current affairs in Hangzhou.
- News 60: primarily focused on livelihood news in Hangzhou.
  - Public Sentiment Observation Room: a public opinion monitoring programme jointly produced by the Hangzhou Corrective Mechanism Office, Hangzhou Examination and Evaluation Office, Hangzhou Efficiency Office, and Hangzhou Radio and Television Group. It aimed to improve the political conduct of government departments and public service sectors. It is now part of News 60.
- Today's Concern: an opinion monitoring and commentary programme, formerly known as Very Concern.
- Our Roundtable: a weekly discussion programme on social issues, similar in format to RTHK's City Forum.
- Caijing First Line: a financial news programme.
- News at Night (discontinued): an evening news programme, formerly known as News Night Train.
- Around Hangzhou: a bilingual programme aimed at expatriates and bilingual audiences in Hangzhou.
- Live 12345: a midday live news programme.
- We're Retired: a purchased programme from the Shanghai Radio and Television City Channel.
- China City Report: a purchased programme from the Guangzhou Radio and Television General Channel.

==== West Lake Pearl Channel ====
- Pearl News: the channel's main Mandarin-language news programme, focusing on social news with additional coverage of economic and current affairs. Known for its fast-paced editing and strong timeliness, it features on-site reporting and interviews, as well as commentary and audience interaction. It received the "Innovation Award" in 1993 in a provincial and municipal television news evaluation organised by the Propaganda Department of the Chinese Communist Party Zhejiang Provincial Committee and the Zhejiang Department of Radio, Film and Television.
- A Liutou Speaks News: the channel's main Hangzhou dialect news programme and the first dialect livelihood news programme in China. Launched on January 1, 2004, it has consistently ranked among the top-rated news programmes in Hangzhou and has received national recognition, including awards such as "China's Top Ten TV Livelihood News Columns" and "National Top Ten Brand TV Livelihood News Columns".
- The Peacemaker: a social mediation programme launched on January 1, 2010.
- Happy Teahouse: launched in 2005, a Chinese opera programme in Wu dialect focusing on social issues through everyday stories. It has been one of the most-watched programmes in the Yangtze River Delta. A version was also launched in Huzhou and Suzhou (the latter has since ended).
- Today's Biggest Cards: a chess programme.
- Police 41: a programme on law and order.
- The Financialist: a financial programme.

==== Life Channel ====
- Citizen's Supervision Group: the channel's main Mandarin-language news programme, with a focus on public opinion supervision, assistance to citizens, and information dissemination.
- I Talk to You: the channel's main Hangzhou dialect news programme, adopting a talk show format. Launched in 2004.
- Happy Player: a board game programme.
- Do It for You: a lifestyle programme in which the host conducts experiential reports, often on farms, recommending agricultural products. The programme's founder and first host, Zhu Danwen (nicknamed "Broken Pants"), died in a car accident on July 15, 2016.
- Life Reference: a programme combining practicality, reference, and interactivity, also broadcast on other municipal TV stations in mainland China.
- Life GoGoGo: a fashion and lifestyle information programme.
- Emerging Hangzhou Businessmen
- About Health: a health information programme.
- Happy Space: a home decoration-themed programme.

==== Movie Channel ====
- Today's New Points: the channel's main news programme.
- Wan You Ying Li: another news programme.
- The Key
- The League of Movie Lovers
- Healthy Uprising

==== Youth–Sports Channel ====
- Kitchen No. 5
- Baby Boom (潮宝贝)
- Mom's Early Arrival
- Hangzhou Children's News
- Famous Teachers' Open Class
- Famous Schools

== Broadcasting services ==
Hangzhou People's Radio is the unified call sign for the radio frequencies operated by the Hangzhou Cultural Radio and Television Group.

=== History ===
In May 1958, the Zhejiang Radio and Television Group provided the broadcasting equipment for a second programme on 1530 kHz to the newly established Hangzhou People's Broadcasting Station, which began broadcasting on September 29, 1958. At that time, Hangzhou Radio mainly rebroadcast programmes from the Central People's Broadcasting Station, along with a small number of self-produced programmes, special features, and lectures.

In August 1960, the editorial department of Hangzhou Radio was merged into the Hangzhou Daily, which created a radio news editing team to supply articles for broadcast. In March 1961, the station suspended operations.

On May 1, 1984, Hangzhou People's Radio officially resumed broadcasting with two sets of programmes on medium wave and FM. In June 1992, the FM stereo frequency was renamed West Lake Sound Radio and formally launched on September 20 of that year. In October 1993, Hangzhou Economic Sound Radio (later renamed Traffic and Economy Radio) began broadcasting.

In 1998, Hangzhou People's Broadcasting Station (HPRS) standardised its call signs across three programmes: HPRS, HPRS Voice of the West Lake (WLH), and HPRS Voice of the Economy (VOE). Under a reform of the Broadcasting Bureau, which implemented a "channel and frequency management system under bureau leadership", the independent establishment of Hangzhou People's Broadcasting Station was abolished.

The station was originally located at No. 86 Moganshan Road, Gongshu District, Hangzhou. In January 2010, it relocated to the Broadcasting Center Building at No. 888 Zhijiang Road, Shangcheng District.

=== Frequency list ===
Channel name	Language	Frequency	Start date	Channel slogan	Predecessor	Notes
General News Frequency	Mandarin	FM 89.0 / AM 954	September 29, 1958		Hangzhou People's Radio (main frequency)	Formerly known as the main frequency of Hangzhou People's Radio, launched on September 29, 1958, suspended in March 1961, and resumed on May 1, 1984. Currently divided into two programmes: FM89 broadcasts as Voice of Hangzhou with a focus on news, while AM954 broadcasts as Old Friend Radio, targeting middle-aged and elderly listeners.
West Lake Sound	Mandarin	FM 105.4	September 20, 1992	The sound has feelings, the heart is in the same place	FM stereo frequency	Began as a 14-hour daily music station, later expanding to 24 hours. It was the first entertainment-oriented radio station in mainland China, with all programmes hosted live and a call-in hotline. Its popularity was dubbed the "West Lake Sound Phenomenon". On January 1, 2007, it was renamed West Lake Sound Auto Radio. It has received multiple awards, including the Five One Project Award for Spiritual Civilization from the Central Propaganda Department, and the titles of "Top Ten Chinese Radio Stations" and "Most Influential City Radio Station in China".
Transportation and Economy Radio (Traffic 918)	Mandarin	FM 91.8	October 14, 1993		Hangzhou Economic Information Radio	Focused on traffic and economic information. Notable programmes include Fast Evening Peak, Leading the Morning Peak, My Car Has Something to Say, and Pinpoint. Hua Shao, now a host on Zhejiang Satellite Television, began his career here.
City Information Radio (MIXFM)	Mandarin	FM 90.7	December 28, 2015			
