= Xiaoli =

Xiaoli may refer to:

- Xiaoli, Hebei (小里镇), town in Rongcheng County
- Xiaoli, Shandong (孝里镇), town in Changqing District, Jinan
