= Yuan Weishi =

Chinese historian and philosopher (born 1931)

- Born: December 15, 1931 (age 94); Xingning, Guangdong, China
- Citizenship: Chinese
- Education: Sun Yat-sen University, Fudan University
- Scientific career
- Fields: History, philosophy
- Workplaces: Sun Yat-sen University

Yuan Weishi (simplified Chinese: 袁伟时; traditional Chinese: 袁偉時; pinyin: Yuán Wěishí; born December 15, 1931) is a Chinese historian and philosopher.

== Biography ==
Yuan was born in Xingning, Guangdong. He was admitted to Sun Yat-sen University Department of Economics in 1950, and then went to a master program in political economy at Fudan University. He worked as a faculty member at Sun Yat-sen University Department of Philosophy.

In the January 2006 issue of Freezing Point, Yuan published an essay titled Modernisation and History Textbooks, criticizing the official theme of government issued middle schools history textbooks, claiming that they contain numbers of distortions of the historical accounts (see for example in the article about the Boxer Rebellion). Professor Yuan said: "The public, especially the students, have the right to find out the true historical facts."

== Works ==
- A Draft History of Modern Chinese Philosophy: Chinese Philosophy during the Beiyang Warlord Period (中國現代哲學史稿: 北洋軍閥統治時期的中國哲學). Guangzhou: 中山大學出版社. 1987.
- Great Changes in the Late Qing: Tides of Thought and Figures (晚清大變局中的思潮與人物. 1992.
- Republished edition: The Sunset of the Empire: Great Changes of the Late Qing (帝國落日‧晚清大變局). 2003.
- Yesterday's China (昨天的中国). 2012.
- Late-coming Civilization (迟到的文明). 2014.
