= Information Times =

Chinese daily newspaper

- 通达民情 • 生活至上
- Native name: 信息时报
- Type: Daily newspaper
- Format: Tabloid
- Owner: Guangzhou Daily Newspaper Group
- Founded: 1985; 41 years ago
- Language: Chinese
- Headquarters: Huimei Business Center, No.83 Guangzhou Nan Boulevard, Haizhu District
- City: Guangzhou, Guangdong Province
- Country: China
- Circulation: 1,570,000 (as of 2014)
- Price: ¥ 1
- OCLC number: 144518437
- Website: epaper.xxsb.com (in Chinese)

Information Times
- Simplified Chinese: 信息时报
- Traditional Chinese: 信息時報
Transcriptions
Standard Mandarin
- Hanyu Pinyin: Xìnxī Shíbào

The Information Times (Chinese: 信息时报; pinyin: Xìnxī Shíbào) is a daily Chinese-language newspaper published under the Guangzhou Daily Newspaper Group. The Information Times was founded in 1985 and is currently published in Guangzhou in Guangdong Province, China.

== History ==
The Information Times was initially founded in 1985 as a daily financial newspaper. On May 15, 2001, The Guangzhou Daily Newspaper Group invested in an update to the paper, making it more comprehensive. Further revisions in the next few years saw the paper focus more on coverage of city news. Several events were planned to celebrate these revisions:

- June 2002: The Beijing–Guangzhou Railway was temporarily renamed the Information Times Line, and free newspapers were given to passengers.
- January 2003: A luxury river boat was renamed the Information Times Line in honor of the newspaper.

In 2006, the newspaper became the largest-selling tabloid newspaper in Guangzhou.

In 2014, the Information Times was the 33rd most circulated daily newspaper in the world and 8th in China according to WAN-IFRA's World Press Trends Report.

== Format ==
- Section A: Political News and Commentary
- Section B: Finance
- Section C: Special Features
- Section D: Entertainment and Lifestyle

== See also ==
- List of newspapers in the People's Republic of China
- Media of the People's Republic of China
