= Li Datong =

Chinese journalist (born 1952)

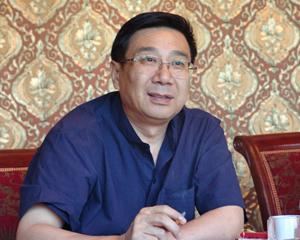
Li Datong

Li Datong (李大同, born 1952) was the Managing Editor of Freezing Point, a section of China Youth Daily. He now writes for openDemocracy, which is based in London.

Datong was openly critical of China's 2018 constitutional change that removed the term limits for the President. In an open letter to the National People's Congress he stated that the change would "sow the seeds of chaos".

== See also ==
- Media in the People's Republic of China
- 2018 amendment to the Constitution of China
