= China Youth Daily =

Chinese Communist Party newspaper

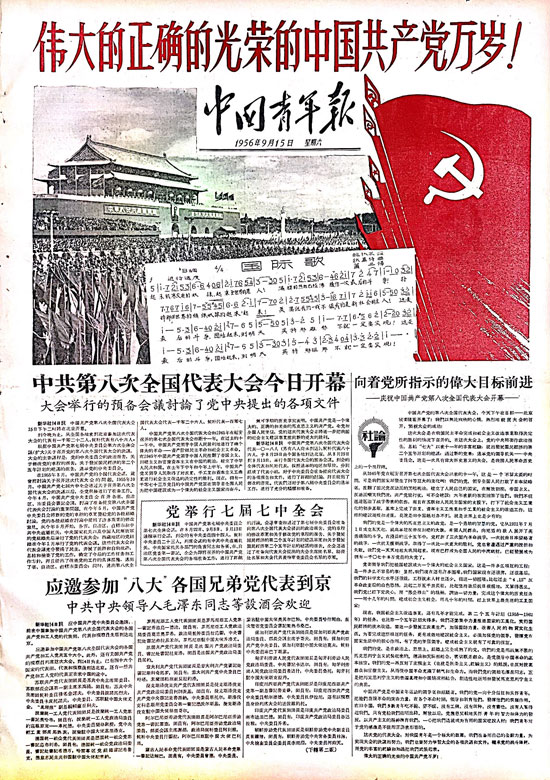
- Front page of the Daily on Sep 15, 1956
- Type: Daily newspaper
- Format: Broadsheet
- Owner: Central Committee of the Communist Youth League of China
- Founded: 1951
- Political alignment: Chinese Communist Party
- Language: Chinese
- Headquarters: Beijing, China
- Website: www.cyol.com

The China Youth Daily (Chinese: 中国青年报) is the official newspaper of the Central Committee of the Communist Youth League of China. It has been the official newspaper of the Communist Youth League of China since 1951. It has occasionally published articles critical of the Chinese government.

== History ==
The China Youth Daily was established in 1951, six years before the Chinese Socialist Youth League decided to change its name to the Communist Youth League of China (CYL).

The Pan Xiao debate (1980) refers to a published letter sent by a young female reader titled Why is the life path getting narrower and narrower which generated 60 thousand response letters in 7 months. It provoked discussion about the meaning of life in the aftermath of the Cultural Revolution.

The newspaper had a circulation of 800,000 in 2006. Freezing Point (冰点 pinyin: Bing diǎn), a four-page weekly supplement of China Youth Daily was temporarily shut down by the Chinese government in early 2006, due to an anti-censorship letter posted by columnist Li Datong. According to The Washington Post, government censors accused the section of "'viciously attacking the socialist system' and condemned a recent article in it that criticized the history textbooks used in Chinese middle schools." Pressure from retired high-level party officials with open mind and senior scholars forced the government to allow publication again, but without its former editor and top investigative reporter, according to The New York Times.

In March 2018, China Youth Daily won the Third National Top 100 Publications in China.

== See also ==
- List of newspapers in the People's Republic of China
