= People's Education =

Chinese journal of education

- Categories: Education
- Frequency: Semi-monthly
- Publisher: China Education Press Agency
- Founded: 1950, Beijing
- Language: Chinese
- ISSN: 0448-9365

People’s Education (人民教育) is a Chinese academic journal in education as well as a platform for spreading China’s education policies and teaching reforms. Founded in Beijing in May 1950, People’s Education has developed into a national comprehensive magazine in basic education, publishing articles on education policy, curriculum reform, teaching practice, and academic research. It is published by the China Education Press Agency of the Ministry of Education of the People's Republic of China.

== History ==
Journal People's Education was established on 1 May 1950, shortly after the founding of the People’s Republic of China, to serve as an official platform for disseminating educational policy and reform initiatives. Mao Zedong wrote an inscription for the inaugural issue: "Restoring and developing people's education is one of the important tasks at present."

From 1981 on, the journal focused on basic education and no longer covers higher education.

In both 1998 and 1999, People's Education was selected as one of the "Top 100 Key Social Science Journals in China."

In 2000, People's Education received five government awards from the General Administration of Press and Publication.

In 2009, People's Education was recognized as one of the "Most Influential Journals in the 60 Years of the People's Republic of China."

In April 2010, on the occasion of the 60th anniversary of the founding of People's Education, State Councilor Liu Yandong wrote a congratulatory letter, encouraging People's Education to "continue to be a pioneer in the cause of education news".

In 2015, the People's Education WeChat Official Account was created.

In 2018, People's Education was rated as one of the "Top 100 Newspapers and Periodicals" in China by the Press and Publication Administration of the State Administration of Press, Publication, Radio, Film and Television.

== Academic status ==
- People’s Education is a core journal in China, and has been indexed in the CSSCI (Chinese Social Sciences Citation Index) extended edition and listed in the Peking University Core Journals Directory.
- Composite Impact Factor: 0.499
- Comprehensive Impact Factor: 0.231

== Other information ==
Address: No. 10, Wenhuiyuan North Road, Haidian District, Beijing

People's Education is a national, comprehensive educational journal under the supervision of the Ministry of Education of the People's Republic of China.

People’s Education is more than a journal — it’s also a platform for spreading China’s education policies and teaching reforms.

People's Education has a circulation of over 200,000 copies, and has extensive influence and good reputation in primary and secondary education.

== See also ==
- Education in China
- Ministry of Education of the People's Republic of China
- China Education Daily
