= Legal Evening News =

Newspaper based in Beijing, China

Legal Evening Post
- Native name: 法制晚报
- Publisher: Legal Evening Post Agency
- Founded: May 18, 2004
- Political alignment: Communism; Socialism with Chinese characteristics
- Language: Chinese
- Headquarters: Beijing, China
- OCLC number: 60843337
- Website: www.fawan.com

Legal Evening News (Chinese: 法制晚报; pinyin: Fǎzhì wǎnbào), also known as The Mirror or Legal Evening Post, was a Beijing-based legal affairs newspaper published in the People's Republic of China in simplified Chinese. Its predecessor was the Beijing Legal News (北京法制报), which was sponsored by the Judicial and Law Enforcement Committee of Beijing Municipal Committee of the Chinese Communist Party (中国共产党北京市委员会政法委员会).

Legal Evening News was a China's state-run newspaper, which was officially inaugurated on May 18, 2004. It was published by the Legal Evening Post Agency (法制晚报社), and was shut down by the Government of China on January 1, 2019.

== History ==
At the end of 2003, Beijing Youth Daily acquired the Beijing Legal News, and relaunched it under the title of Legal Evening News on May 18, 2004. On April 29, 2005, fawan.com, the official website of Legal Evening News, was created.

Legal Evening News earned a reputation for cutting-edge investigative reporting and deep dives into crime and social issues.

On January 1, 2019, the paper was officially shut down by the Chinese government due to rising censorship and a shift to internet advertising.
