= Changjiang Daily =

Chinese Communist Party newspaper

- Native name: 长江日报
- Type: Daily newspaper
- Owner: Changjiang Daily Press Group
- Founded: May 16, 1949
- Political alignment: Chinese Communist Party
- Language: Chinese
- Headquarters: Changjiang Media Building, No. 113 Jinqiao Avenue, Jiang'an District, Wuhan City, Hubei Province, China
- Website: cjrb.cjn.cn

The Changjiang Daily (simplified Chinese: 长江日报; traditional Chinese: 長江日報), also called "Yangtze Daily" or "Changjiang Ribao" in Pinyin Romanization, is the official newspaper of the Wuhan Municipal Committee of the Chinese Communist Party (CCP). Founded in 1949, Changjiang Daily is now published and distributed by the Changjiang Daily Newspaper Group. The readers are mainly enterprises, government agencies, schools, and intellectuals.

== History ==
On May 16, 1949, the People's Liberation Army captured Wuhan, a large city on both sides of Changjiang, the longest reiver of China. On May 23, the Changjiang Daily was founded at No. 2 Taining Street, Hankou. Mao Zedong personally wrote the masthead. Subsequently, Changjiang Daily became the official newspaper of the Central China Bureau of the CCP Central Committee (later renamed the Central South Bureau of the CCP Central Committee), the Wuhan Municipal Committee of the CCP, and the Hubei Provincial Committee of the CCP.

On June 1, 1950, the Hubei Provincial Committee of the CCP adopted the Hubei Daily as its official newspaper. On January 1, 1952, the Wuhan Municipal Committee of the CCP adopted the New Wuhan Daily as its official newspaper, making Changjiang Daily merely the official newspaper of the Central South Bureau of the CCP Central Committee.

At the end of 1952, the Central South Bureau of the CCP Central Committee believed that all provinces and cities under its jurisdiction had established official newspapers, and decided that the Changjiang Daily would cease publication on December 31 of that year. The CCP Wuhan Municipal Committee then took over the name of the "Changjiang Daily", and the New Wuhan Daily was renamed "Changjiang Daily" to continue publication. Some of the original staff of the Changjiang Daily and the original staff of the New Wuhan Daily then jointly undertook the work of the new Changjiang Daily.

In 1960, Changjiang Daily merged with Hubei Daily, and closed in 1961.

In 1967, Changjiang Daily resumed publication.

In 2003, the Changjiang Daily Newspaper Group was founded based on Changjiang Daily.

In 2010, Changjiang Daily was elected into "China's Top 10 Media Groups that Influenced China in 2009-2010".

On September 23, 2015, the new media platform "Jiupai News" created by the Changjiang Daily Newspaper Group was officially launched. It published the inaugural article "Heart Tide Rises High" on the Jiupai News app, the WeChat public account "Jiupai News", and the Changjiang Daily. The name "Jiupai" (Chinese: 九派, nine rivers) is derived from Mao Zedong's poem "Bodhisattva Man: Yellow Crane Tower" which says, "The vast nine rivers flow through China, and a single line runs through the north and south."

== Honors ==
In 2018, Changjiang Daily was elected into the 2017 list of the Top 100 Newspapers in China.

== See also ==
- List of newspapers in China
- Changjiang
- Wuhan
