= Beijing Today =

Weekly English language newspaper

- Front page of Beijing Today from 3 January 2014
- Type: Weekly newspaper
- Format: Compact
- Owner(s): Beijing Education Media Co., Ltd.
- Publisher: Beijing Youth Daily Publishing Company
- Editor: Jack Wang
- Founded: May 2001
- Language: English
- Headquarters: 23 Baijiazhuang Dong Li, Chaoyang District, Beijing, China
- Circulation: 50,000 weekly (as of August 2011)
- Price: CN¥3.00
- ISSN: 2095-9591
- Website: beijingtoday.com.cn

Beijing Today (Chinese: 今日北京; pinyin: Jīnrì Běijīng) is a weekly English newspaper catering to expatriates and embassies that covers current events, art, cinema, music, dining, and shopping in Beijing.

The newspaper is run by the publisher of Beijing Youth Daily.

It is assigned the Chinese Issue Number (Chinese: 统一刊号; pinyin: tǒngyī kānhào) CN11-0120.

== History ==
Beijing Today began publication in May 2001 as a 16-page broadsheet newspaper. Its initial incarnation focused on hard news and was positioned to compete with China Daily in the Beijing market.

In May 2005, the paper was redesigned as a 32-page compact with a stronger focus on art and culture, as well as events at local embassies. The print size contracted to 24 pages in 2006 and 16 pages in January 2012.

In December 2011, Beijing Today Media became wholly owned by Beijing Education Media, another subsidiary of the Beijing Youth Daily Group. As part of its transition to Beijing Education Media, Beijing Today began publishing an 8-page edition packaged together with a new 8-page paper called Teens Post.

Teens Post ran its final issue on July 19, 2013, and Beijing Today resumed a 16-page print run. The current incarnation splits content between two sections: Beijing Today Metro and Beijing Today News.

== See also ==
- List of newspapers in the People's Republic of China
- Media of the People's Republic of China
- Global Times
- China Daily
- Shanghai Daily
- Shenzhen Daily
