= China Education Daily =

Chinese educational newspaper

- Native name: 中国教育报
- Type: Daily newspaper
- Owner: Ministry of Education (China)
- Publisher: China Education Press Agency
- Editor-in-chief: Zhou Fei (周飞)
- Founded: July 7, 1983; 43 years ago
- Language: Chinese
- Headquarters: No. 10, Wenhuiyuan North Road, Haidian District, Beijing
- Readership: Educators, students, and people from all walks of life
- Website: http://paper.jyb.cn/

The China Education Daily (simplified Chinese: 中国教育报; traditional Chinese: 中國教育報; pinyin: Zhōngguó jiàoyù bào) is an educational newspaper published by the China Education Press Agency under the supervision of the Ministry of Education of the People's Republic of China. Officially launched in 1983, China Education Daily is the only national-level education daily in China.

== Historical Development ==
In August 1982, the Ministry of Education of China began preparations for the publication of China Education Daily. Most of the editorial staff came from the editorial offices of People's Education and Higher Education Front.

On March 3, 1983, the first trial issue of the China Education Daily was published, and it was published weekly thereafter. Deng Xiaoping wrote the title in his handwriting for the newspaper. The first page of the trial issue published an article by He Dongchang, then Minister of Education, entitled "Educational Reform Should Proceed from China's Reality". The official issue was published on July 7, 1983.

On September 14, 1985, the Shanghai branch of the China Education Daily was established.

On January 1, 1993, the China Education Daily was changed to a daily newspaper.

In June 2000, the online version of the China Education Daily was officially launched.

On July 1, 2006, the online version of the China Education Daily was renamed China Education News Network and began trial operation. On August 28 of the same year, it was officially renamed and officially launched on November 8.

In 2018, the newspaper was selected for the 2017 list of the top 100 newspapers in China.

In December 2019, China Education Daily was selected as one of the TOP 10 in the "New Media Influence Index".

== Current situation ==
China Education Daily is China's only national-level daily newspaper dedicated to education, and it is the most authoritative and influential education news media in the country.

== See also ==
- Education in China
- Ministry of Education of the People's Republic of China
- People's Education
