= Haikou Evening News =

- Native name: 海口晚报
- Type: Daily newspaper
- Format: Tabloid
- Language: Chinese
- Headquarters: Haikou, Hainan
- Price: 1 RMB
- Website: http://www.hkwb.net/ (Simplified Chinese)

The Haikou Evening News (Chinese: 海口晚报; pinyin: Hǎikǒu Wǎnbào) is a daily Chinese language newspaper published in Haikou City, Hainan Province, China.

It was renamed as Haikou Daily on December 10, 2015 (海口日报).

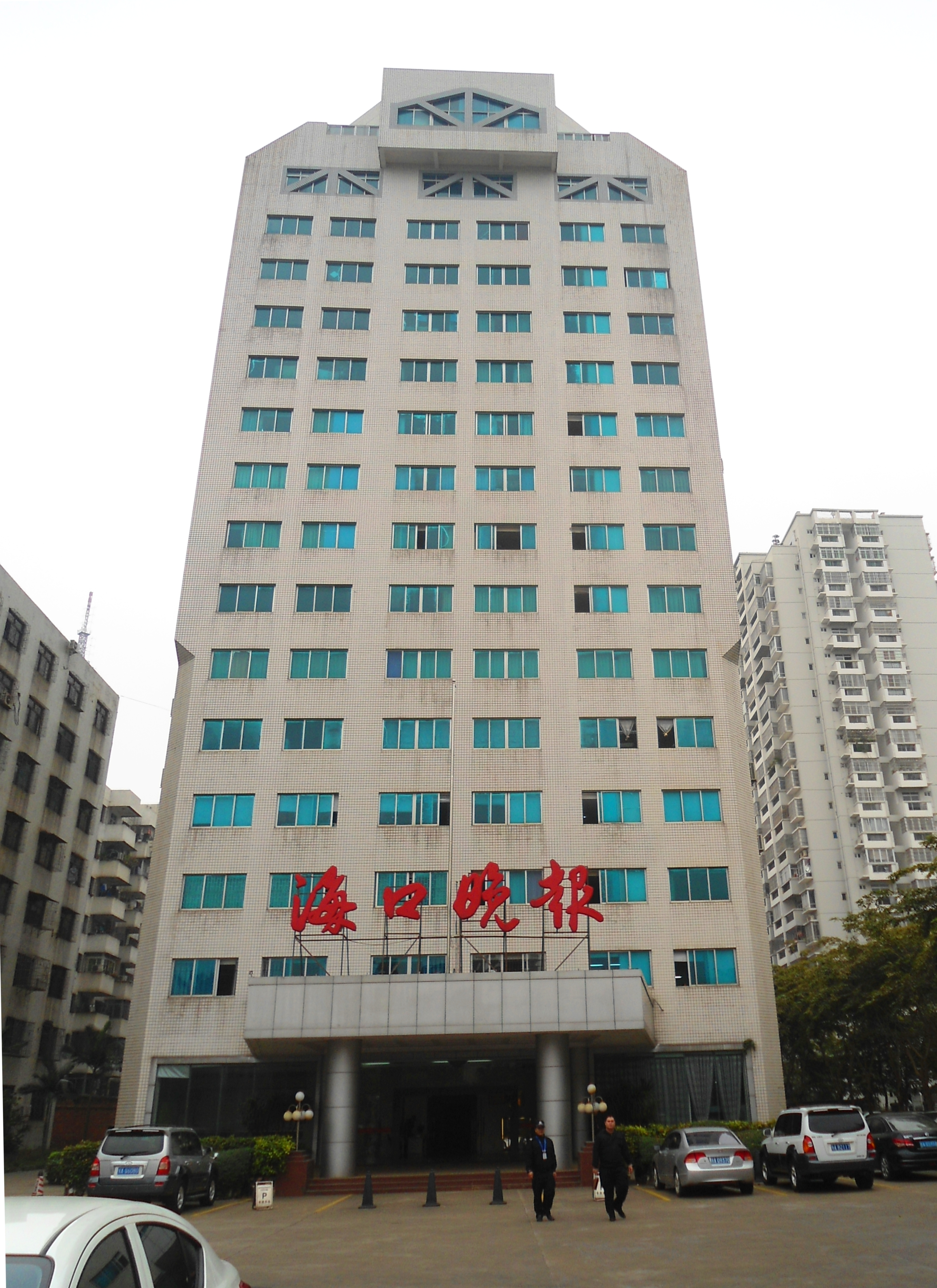
Headquarters
