= Beijing Youth Daily =

Simplified Chinese newspaper

Beijing Youth Daily 北京青年报
- Cover of Beijing Youth Daily on 16 August 2013
- Type: Daily newspaper
- Format: Broadsheet
- Owner: Beijing Municipal Committee of the Communist Youth League of China
- Publisher: Beijing Youth Daily Agency
- Editor-in-chief: Yu Haibo
- Founded: March 21, 1949
- Political alignment: Chinese Communist Party
- Language: Chinese (simplified)
- Headquarters: Beijing
- Circulation: 650,000 (2000)
- OCLC number: 144518975
- Website: bjyouth.ynet.cn

Beijing Youth Daily (Abbreviation: BYD, simplified Chinese: 北京青年报; traditional Chinese: 北京青年報; pinyin: Běijīng qīngnián bào) is the official newspaper of the Beijing Municipal Committee of the Communist Youth League of China.

Beijing Youth Daily was launched on 21 March 1949, and is now published by the Beijing Youth Daily Agency (北京青年报社). It is the most widely circulated metropolitan newspaper in Beijing.

Beijing Youth Daily has halted production three times in its history. It has been published since 1981.

It is assigned the Chinese Issue Number (统一刊号; tǒngyī kānhào) CN11-0103.

== Publication ==
The daily typically publishes about 50 broadsheet pages per day. In addition to its flagship Beijing Youth Daily, the media group publishes nine other newspapers:

- Legal Evening News (法制晚报; fǎzhì wǎnbào)
- First Financial Daily (第一财经日报; dìyī cáijīng rìbào)
- Hebei Youth Daily (河北青年报; héběi qīngnián bào)
- Beijing Science and Technology News (北京科技报; běijīng kējì bào)
- Youth Weekend (青年周末; qīngnián zhōumò)
- Beijing Today (今日北京; jīnrì běijīng)
- Middle School Times (中学时事报; zhōngxué shíshì bào)
- Beijing Children's Daily (北京少年报; běijīng shàonián bào)
- Top Horizon (TOP时空; TOP shíkōng)
- Beijing Youth Weekly (北京青年周刊; běijīng qīngnián zhōukān)

As well as four magazines:

- CéCi Sisters (CéCi姐妹; céci jiěmèi)
- Casual Fashion (休闲时尚; xiūxián shíshàng)
- News Mirror (时事魔镜; shíshì mójìng)
- Campus Report 39.2° (校园报告39度2; xiàoyuán bàogào jiǔshí dù èr)

== History ==
On December 22, 2004, Beijing Media Corporation Limited (北青传媒股份有限公司), under Beijing Youth Daily Holdings, listed its H-shares in Hong Kong, becoming the first mainland Chinese media company to be publicly traded overseas.
