= Hunan Daily =

Chinese Communist Party newspaper

- Native name: 湖南日报
- Type: Daily newspaper
- Format: Print, online
- Owner: Hunan Provincial Committee of the Chinese Communist Party
- Founded: 15 August 1949; 76 years ago
- Political alignment: Chinese Communist Party
- Language: Chinese
- Website: hnrb.voc.com.cn/hnrb_epaper/

Hunan Daily (simplified Chinese: 湖南日报; traditional Chinese: 湖南日報; pinyin: Húnán Rìbào), founded on August 15 of 1949, is the official newspaper of the Hunan Provincial Committee of the Chinese Communist Party and is currently part of the Hunan Daily Newspaper Group (Hunan Daily Press). It is also one of the top 100 newspapers in China. Mao Zedong wrote the title for Hunan Daily three times.

== History ==
On January 25, 1938, the predecessor of Hunan Daily, Guancha Daily, was founded in Changsha. On April 17, 1939, the Kuomintang forced Guancha Daily to cease publication, citing inconsistencies in registration procedures.

On April 30, 1949, Mao Zedong retitled the newspaper "New Hunan Daily". The newspaper was founded on August 15, 1949, 10 days before the peaceful liberation of Hunan.

"In early to mid-March 1960, Mao Zedong said the original title was too dull. Then, at the request of Zhang Pinghua, the provincial Chinese Communist Party Committee Secretary of Hunan, he re-wrote the title for the New Hunan Daily.

On July 18, 1964, Mao Zedong proposed to change the name of New Hunan Daily to Hunan Daily to make it consistent with Hubei Daily, and the Hunan Provincial Committee of the Chinese Communist Party asked Mao Zedong to write the title again. On July 29, Mao Zedong wrote the name of the newspaper for the third time and wrote a letter instructing that it be put into use on October 1, 1964.

According to the requirements of the "Plan for Deepening the Reform of the Provincial State-Owned Cultural Assets Management System" issued by the Hunan Provincial Committee of the Chinese Communist Party and the Hunan Provincial People's Government, the management and operation mechanisms of Hunan Daily Newspaper Group and Hunan Radio and Television Station were optimized. On July 2, 2015, Hunan Daily Newspaper Group Co., Ltd. and Hunan Radio and Television Group Co., Ltd. held an unveiling ceremony.

In 2018, Hunan Daily was selected into the recommended list of the "Top 100 Newspapers and Periodicals in China in 2017".

In 2024, Hunan Daily was selected as one of the “Chinese Newspapers with High Academic Influence in 2024” by CNKI.

== Layout ==
Hunan Daily currently has 8 pages on Mondays and Saturdays, 12 pages from Tuesday to Thursday, 16 pages on Fridays, and 4 pages on Sundays. The main sections include breaking news, classified news, and special issues and editions. The classified news edition includes politics, economy, culture and education, opinion, city and state news, etc.; the special issues and special editions include good articles, observations, in-depth readings, theories, public opinion, photography, current affairs and sports, Xiangjiang Weekly, etc.

== Incident ==
In March 2016, Hunan Daily Newspaper Group's Chinese Communist Party Deputy Committee Secretary and general manager Pi Lin was investigated for suspected "serious violations of discipline". At the same time, CCP member and social affairs committee member Liu Shulin was also investigated for the same suspected violations. In August 2016, Pi Lin was expelled from the CCP and dismissed for suspected improper sexual relations and power-for-sex transactions.

== See also ==
- Nanfang Daily – similar daily of the neighboring Guangdong Province.
- List of newspapers in China
