= Shenzhen Economic Daily =

Chinese Communist Party newspaper

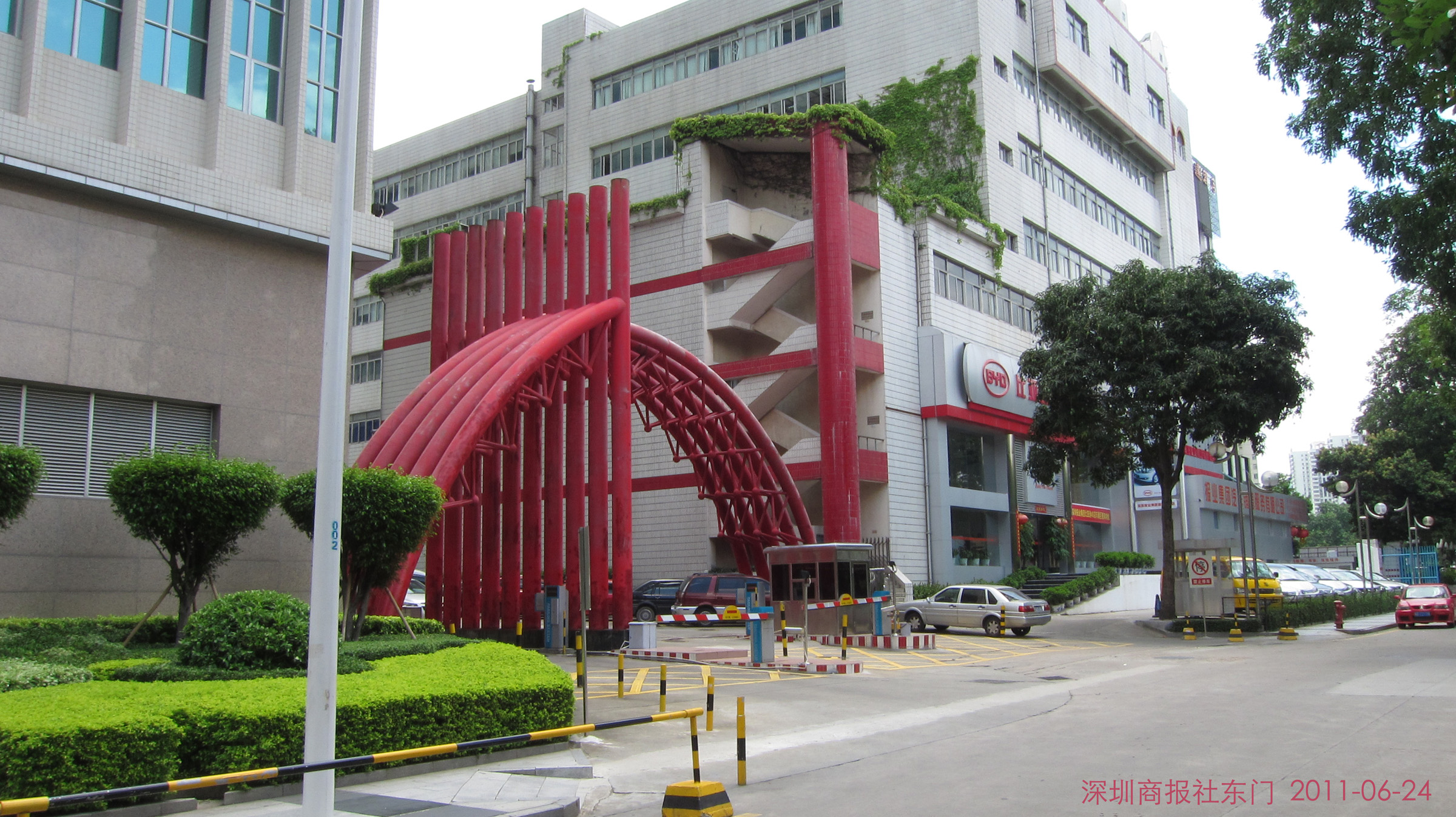
- Type: Chinese Communist Party newspaper
- Owner: Shenzhen municipal committee of the Chinese Communist Party
- Founded: January 8, 1989
- Headquarters: Shenzhen
- OCLC number: 81952948
- Website: szsb.sznews.com

The Shenzhen Economic Daily (abbreviated as SED; Chinese: 深圳商报), alternatively translated as Shenzhen Business Post, Shenzhen Commercial Daily, Shenzhen Business News, is a large comprehensive daily newspaper with economic reporting as its main focus, and is the party newspaper directly under the Shenzhen Municipal Committee of the Chinese Communist Party. The newspaper was launched on January 8, 1989, and is divided into four sections: "News Section", "Economy Section", "Recreation Section" and "Market Section".

Late on the night of August 5, 2021, Shenzhen Economic Daily was dissatisfied with the stock market being affected by the commentaries, criticizing these Chinese central media for "naming names and making carping comments" at listed companies, causing stock prices to fall. The newspaper said it should beware of media interference in the stock market.

Beware of Media Interference with the Stock Market, published by Shenzhen Economic Daily, sparked heated debate after its release, but it was finally taken offline the newspaper. Although the article was censored, its sharp criticism of some mainstream media still triggered a lot of attention from many Chinese netizens.
