= Dongguan Times =

Simplified Chinese newspaper

- Native name: 东莞时报
- Type: Daily newspaper
- Founder: Zhou Zhichen
- Founded: March 26, 2008
- Language: Simplified Chinese
- Headquarters: Dongguan
- Website: dgtimes.timedg.com epaper.timedg.com

Dongguan Times or Dongguan Shibao (simplified Chinese: 东莞时报; traditional Chinese: 東莞時報; pinyin: Dōngguǎn shíbào) is a Dongguan-based Chinese daily newspaper, and is the only local morning metropolitan newspaper in Dongguan.

== History ==
Dongguan Times was sponsored and is supervised by the Dongguan Daily Agency](东莞日报社). The paper was founded by Zhou Zhichen (周智琛) on March 26, 2008.

Tan Junbo (谭军波), co-founder of Southern Metropolis Daily, was the editor-in-chief of Dongguan Times, who resigned in 2017.
