= Hebei Daily =

Chinese Communist Party newspaper

- Native name: 河北日报
- Type: Daily newspaper
- Format: Print, online
- Owner: Hebei Provincial Committee of the Chinese Communist Party
- Publisher: Hebei Daily Newspaper Group
- Founded: 1949
- Language: Chinese
- OCLC number: 502405237
- Website: www.hebnews.cn

Hebei Daily (simplified Chinese: 河北日报; traditional Chinese: 河北日報; pinyin: Héběi rìbào) is the official newspaper of the Hebei Provincial Committee of the Chinese Communist Party (CCP).

== History and profile ==
Hebei Daily was established in 1949. It is edited in the provincial capital Shijiazhuang and printed in 11 cities every morning. This newspaper is broadsheet, often with 16 pages. Its report is focused on daily activities of Provincial Communist Leaders (such as Provincial Party Secretary Bai Keming) and the social and economic development of the province.

As a newspaper mainly for propaganda purposes, it is circulated in the government departments, state-owned companies, and military units.

Its publisher is Hebei Daily Newspaper Group, which owns Yanzhao Metropolis Daily, a tabloid.

In March 2018, Hebei Daily won the Third National Top 100 Newspapers in China.
