= Beijing Suburbs Daily =

Chinese-language daily newspaper

- Type: Daily newspaper
- Founder: Beijing Daily Agency
- Founded: 3 October 1980
- Ceased publication: 29 December 2018
- Website: jjrb.bjd.com.cn beijingdaily.com.cn/JJRB

The Beijing Suburbs Daily (Chinese: 京郊日报), or Jingjiao Ribao, originally named Beijing Daily Suburban Edition (北京日报郊区版), was a Chinese-language daily newspaper published in China. Founded by Beijing Daily Agency (北京日报社) on 3 October 1980, it was one of the series of newspapers of Beijing Daily Press Group (北京日报报业集团).

== History ==
Beijing Suburbs Daily was formerly known as Beijing Daily Suburban Edition, which was developed from Beijing Peasants' Post (北京农民报), a newspaper sponsored on 9 February 1958, by the Rural Work Department of the Beijing Municipal Committee of the Chinese Communist Party.

On 1 January 1994, Beijing Daily Suburban Edition was changed to its current name.

On 29 December 2018, Beijing Suburbs Daily stopped publication.
