= Yanzhao Metropolis Daily =

Simplified Chinese newspaper

- Native name: 燕赵都市报
- Type: Daily newspaper
- Format: Print, online
- Owner: Hebei Provincial Committee of the Chinese Communist Party
- Publisher: Hebei Daily Newspaper Group
- Founded: 1 January 1996
- Political alignment: Chinese Communist Party
- Language: Chinese
- Headquarters: Shijiazhuang
- OCLC number: 866042248
- Website: yzdsb.hebnews.cn

Yanzhao Metropolis Daily or Yanzhao Dushibao (simplified Chinese: 燕赵都市报; traditional Chinese: 燕趙都市報; pinyin: Yānzhào dūshì bào), also known as Yanzhao Metropolitan Daily, is a morning newspaper published in the Hebei province of the People's Republic of China. It is owned by Hebei Daily Newspaper Group of the Hebei Provincial Committee of the Chinese Communist Party, which also publishes Hebei Daily.

Yanzhao Metropolis Daily was sponsored by the Hebei Daily Agency (河北日报社) in January 1996. It has two local editions: Metropolis Express for Shijiazhuang, provincial capital; and East Hebei Edition for Tangshan, a city in eastern Hebei.
