= Dahe, Rongcheng County =

Dahe 大河镇
- Town
- Dàhé Zhèn
- Location in Hebei Location in China
- Coordinates: 39°01′48″N 115°59′06″E
- Country: People's Republic of China
- Province: Hebei
- Prefecture-level city: Baoding
- County: Rongcheng

Area
  - Total: 33.43 km^{2} (12.91 sq mi)

Population (2010)
  - Total: 23,126
  - Density: 691.8/km^{2} (1,792/sq mi)
- Time zone: UTC+8 (China Standard)

Dahe (Chinese: 大河镇; pinyin: Dàhé Zhèn) is a town located in Rongcheng County, Baoding, Hebei, China. According to the 2010 census, Dahe had a population of 23,126, including 11,677 males and 11,449 females. The population was distributed as follows: 3,675 people aged under 14, 17,304 people aged between 15 and 64, and 2,147 people aged over 65.

== See also ==
- List of township-level divisions of Hebei
