= Xianning Daily =

Newspaper in Hubei, China

- Type: Daily newspaper
- Founded: July 1, 1966
- Language: Chinese
- Headquarters: Xianning, Hubei
- OCLC number: 123264495
- Website: szb.xnnews.com.cn/xnrb

Xianning Daily (咸宁日报; 咸寧日報) is a Hubei-based Chinese newspaper published in China, it is the organ newspaper of the Xianning Municipal Committee of the Chinese Communist Party.

Xianning Daily is published by the Xianning Daily Office, sponsored by the Xianning Daily Media Group, and its current president is Huang Sheng.

== History ==
Xianning Daily was launched on July 1, 1966, and was formerly known as Xianning Post, which was founded by the Xianning Local Committee of the CCP.
