= Hangzhou Daily =

Chinese Communist Party newspaper

- Type: Daily newspaper
- Owner: Hangzhou Municipal Committee of the Chinese Communist Party
- Publisher: Hangzhou Daily Press Group
- Founded: November 1, 1955
- Political alignment: Chinese Communist Party
- Language: Chinese
- Headquarters: Hangzhou
- Website: hzdaily.hangzhou.com.cn

Hangzhou Daily (simplified Chinese: 杭州日报; traditional Chinese: 杭州日報; pinyin: Hángzhōu rìbào), is a daily newspaper based in Hangzhou, China. Founded on November 1, 1955, Hangzhou Daily serves as the official newspaper of the Hangzhou Municipal Committee of the Chinese Communist Party (CCP). It is overseen by the Hangzhou Municipal Committee of the CCP and managed by the Hangzhou Daily Newspaper Group. It is the third official newspaper of a provincial capital city party committee after the Yangtze River Daily and Shenyang Daily.

== History ==
On April 18, 1955, the CCP Hangzhou Municipal Committee established the Preparatory Committee for Hangzhou Daily. Hu Jingwei, a member of the Standing Committee of the CCP Hangzhou Municipal Committee and Minister of the Publicity Department, was tapped as its director. Hangzhou Daily was officially founded on November 1 of the same year. In its early publication phase, the newspaper was a folio format comprising four pages, featuring sections on news, local news, culture, and lifestyle, alongside special editions and Xinhua News Agency wire services. During the early 1960s, however, it transitioned to four pages with a limited circulation of 30,000 copies due to economic challenges.

Following the outbreak of the Cultural Revolution from January 1–10 in 1967, all editions of Hangzhou Daily consisted solely of Xinhua News Agency wire reports. Normal publications resumed on January 11. On September 5, 1968, publication was temporarily suspended but was recommenced on December 16 of the same year, maintaining the four-page format.

In 1985, the newspaper reverted to a folio format with four pages. After the 1990s, Hangzhou Daily underwent further changes and expansions. In March 1992, it launched a four-page folio section titled "West Lake Weekend" which was later expanded to eight color pages. In November 1993, the "Afternoon Edition" was introduced, which served as the precursor to the "Daily Business Daily".

On 31 December 1999, Hangzhou Daily released its 100th commemorative edition to welcome the new century, divided into five sections: "Brilliant History", "Ancient Capital Literary Rhythm", "Cangsang Town", "Hundred Schemes of Livelihood", and "Hundred Years of Elites", with over 60 pages dedicated to news. This edition set a record for the number of pages published by Zhejiang newspapers in a single day. On October 20, 2000, to celebrate the West Lake Expo 2000, Hangzhou Daily launched a 12-page color edition, followed by a special 128-page edition dedicated to the Expo, along with a CD-ROM publication.

On January 1, 2000, Hangzhou Daily expanded to 12 pages of colour printing. Later, on November 14, Hangzhou Daily was recognized as "the second advanced unit of local newspaper management" by the General Administration of Press and Publication of the People's Republic of China. Subsequently, on November 8, 2001, the Hangzhou Daily Newspaper Group was established.

In 2018, the newspaper was selected as one of the National Top 100 Newspapers for 2017. In March 2018, Hangzhou Daily won the Third National Top 100 Newspapers in China.
