= People's Liberation Army Daily =

People's Liberation Army newspaper

- Type: Daily newspaper
- Owner: Political Work Department of the Central Military Commission
- Founded: 1 January 1956
- Political alignment: Chinese Communist Party
- Headquarters: Fuchengmenwai Street, Xicheng District, Beijing
- Website: eng.chinamil.com.cn

The People's Liberation Army Daily (Chinese: 解放军报; pinyin: Jiěfàngjūn Bào), or PLA Daily for short, is the official newspaper of the Chinese People's Liberation Army (PLA). Institutionally, the PLA Daily provides information on the policies and viewpoints of the Central Military Commission, and in that capacity speaks on the part of the PLA itself. Its editorial line adheres closely to that found in the Chinese Communist Party's own official newspaper, People's Daily.

== History ==
The PLA Daily was established on 1 January 1956, under the aegis of the Chinese Communist Party's Central Military Commission as the Army's official newspaper. During the Cultural Revolution, the publications chief editor was purged in a political struggle and Marshal Lin Biao—at the time Mao Zedong's close comrade and Minister of National Defense—was named officer in charge of the paper in an acting capacity before becoming its editor in chief. The most important editorials of the newspaper were jointly published by People's Daily and Red Flag together with its own staff from 1967 to 1978, becoming thus the so-called Two Newspapers and One Journal, directly representing the highest voice of Chinese Communist Party.

The PLA Daily is owned and operated by the Political Work Department of the Central Military Commission, until 2016 the People's Liberation Army General Political Department, and its staff and correspondents mostly come from the press bureaus of the army's service branches and theater commands nationwide.

In March 2018, People's Liberation Army Daily won the Third National Top 100 Newspapers in China.

== Editorial line ==
The paper generally covers news stories relating to the PLA and other military affairs, while projecting the voice of the military into the public policy realm for primarily domestic consumption. In August 2010, an editorial suggested that Chinese military strategy was out of date, and that China must "audaciously learn from the experience of the information cultures of foreign militaries", along with modernization and open procurement.

The PLA Daily, while officially serving as the voice of the military, does not stray far from the Party's own messaging when it comes to foreign policy. "There is a strong correlation between foreign policy rhetoric in the—CCP's civilian voice—the People's Daily—and its military voice—the PLA Daily", writes scholar of strategy Alastair Iain Johnston.

The appearances of the pet policy initiatives of Chinese leaders in the pages of PLA Daily are often taken by scholars as an expression of those leaders' strength in the military. Scholars with the Strategic Studies Institute of the U.S. Army War College cites the vast number of appearances of propaganda related to the "scientific development concept"—promulgated by Party leader Hu Jintao—as evidence that Hu's "influence on certain areas of the PLA's development since 2004 has been substantial."

== See also ==
- Newspapers and journals of the Chinese Communist Party
