= Wuxi Daily =

Simplified Chinese newspaper

- Native name: 无锡日报
- Type: Daily newspaper
- Format: Print, online
- Owner: Wuxi Municipal Government
- Founded: 1949
- Language: Chinese
- Website: www.wxrb.com

Wuxi Daily (Chinese: 无锡日报; pinyin: Wúxī Rìbào) was established on August 1, 1949. It is owned by the Wuxi Municipal Government. Wuxi Daily was the first newspaper to be available online in Jiangsu.

== About ==
Wuxi Daily is the mainstream media in Wuxi. The newspaper focuses on reporting economic, social and political events in the Greater Wuxi District, which includes Wuxi, Jiangyin, and Yixing.

Currently, the total circulation is above 600,000.
