= Freezing Point (magazine) =

Chinese news magazine (1995-)

Freezing Point (Chinese: 冰点; pinyin: bīng diǎn) was a news journal in the People's Republic of China which was the subject of controversy over its criticism of Communist Party officials and the sympathetic ear it lent to a Chinese historian who had criticized official history textbooks.

== History and profile ==
Freezing Point was started in 1995 as a one-page publication and was expanded into a weekly magazine in 2004. A weekly supplement to China Youth Daily, it was temporarily closed down by officials 24 January 2006, but was allowed to reopen in March that year, though without its former editor Li Datong and without Taiwan-based columnist Lung Yingtai.

The official reason for the January 2006 shutdown of Freezing Point was an article by history professor Yuan Weishi of Sun Yat-sen University. The article dissented from the official view of the Boxer Rebellion.

== See also ==
- List of magazines in China
- Censorship in the People's Republic of China
