= National Top 100 Publications =

Chinese government ranking system

The National Top 100 Publications (Chinese: 全国百强报刊) is a ranking of Chinese newspapers and magazines by the National Press and Publication Administration (NPPA) since 2013.

The third list was released in 2017. Over 30% of the publications chosen in 2017 were owned by the Chinese Communist Party.

== Winners ==
- Anhui Daily
- Cell Research
- Science Bulletin
- Acta Physica Sinica
- Beijing Daily
- Bingtuan Daily
- China Pictorial
- China Women's News
- China Youth Daily
- Chinese Physics B
- CPPCC Daily
- Current Zoology
- Economic Daily
- Fujian Daily
- Guangming Daily
- Hainan Daily
- Hangzhou Daily
- Hunan Daily
- Jiefang Daily
- People's Daily
- People's Liberation Army Daily
- Qiushi
- Research in Astronomy and Astrophysics
- Shanghai Securities Journal
- Shenzhen Special Zone Daily
- Sichuan Daily
- West China City Daily
- Xinhua Daily
- Xinjiang Daily
- Xinmin Evening News
- Yangcheng Evening News
