= Nanguo Metropolis Daily =

Simplified Chinese newspaper

- Native name: 南国都市报
- Type: Daily newspaper
- Format: Tabloid
- Owner: Hainan Daily Newspaper Industry Group
- Publisher: Nanguo Metropolis Daily Agency
- Founded: January 1, 2001
- Language: Chinese
- Headquarters: Haikou
- Website: szb.ngdsb.cn

The Nanguo Metropolis Daily (simplified Chinese: 南国都市报; traditional Chinese: 南國都市報; pinyin: Nánguó dūshì bào), also known as South China Metropolis Daily or South China Metropolitan Daily, is a Haikou-based Chinese language daily newspaper published in Hainan, China. The newspaper is a sub-paper of Hainan Daily.

Nanguo Metropolis Daily was sponsored and is supervised by the Hainan Daily Newspaper Industry Group (海南日报报业集团). The newspaper is the first metropolis newspaper in Hainan.

Nanguo Metropolis Daily was launched on January 1, 2001. According to a poll by Central China Television (CCTV), the paper has the largest share of the newspaper market in Hainan. In 2009, Nanguo Metropolis Daily was rated in the top ten most innovative metropolitan newspapers in China.

== See also ==
- Hainan Daily, Hainan's other major daily newspaper
