= Chinese tabloid =

Tabloid journalism in China

Chinese tabloid is a newspaper format that became extremely popular in the People's Republic of China in the mid-1990s. Like tabloids in the rest of the world, they focus on sensationalism and scandal.

== History ==
The rise of the tabloid format is associated with withdrawal of governmental subsidies to newspapers in the late 1980s. Faced with the possibility of bankruptcy, many newspapers changed their formats to emphasize investigative reporting and bold editorial policies. Many of these newspapers are owned by units of the Chinese Communist Party; however, this ownership has the odd effect of giving the newspapers the political cover to take a more critical line against the government.

Others argue that although tabloids have inadvertently led to a fragmented and decentralized press structure that undermines core party organs, the Chinese regime has maintained a fundamental stronghold on public discourse through media market influence and political control.

== Notable coverage ==
Chinese tabloids have been crucial in breaking some of the major stories on social crises facing mainland China including the AIDS epidemic in Henan, the dangers of coal mining, and the corruption inherent in the system of custody and repatriation.

== See also ==
- Newspapers of the People's Republic of China
- Media in China
