= Titan Sports Media Group =

Chinese media company

- Industry: Multi-media Group
- Founded: 1988
- Headquarters: Changsha and Beijing, China
- Products: Titan Sports; Titan Sports Plus
- Website: www.titan24.com (Chinese Only)

Titan Sports Media Group (Chinese: 体坛传媒集团) is one of the most influential sports media groups in China. It owns the newspaper Titan Sports and ten other magazines.

== Name ==
When it was founded as a sports newspaper, the Chinese name of the media group was 体坛, which means sports field. "体坛" is pronounced as tǐtán in Chinese pinyin (The Chinese official romantization system of Chinese characters). The name was then translated as Titan in English, the word used to refer to the descendants of the gods in Greek Mythology.

== History ==
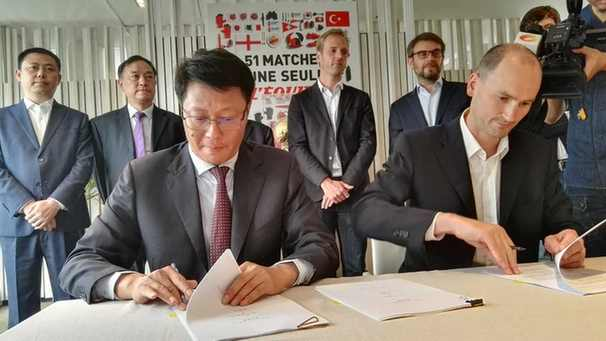
Titan Sports Media Group and Éditions Philippe Amaury signed a cooperation agreement on Aug. 29th, 2016

Titan Sports Media Group was initially founded in 1988 in Changsha, Hunan province as Titan Sports. At the time of its foundation, Titan Sports was a regional newspaper owned by Hunan Sports General Association. Titan Sports is the most circulated sports newspaper in China. The magazines published by Titan Sports Media Group include Football Weekly, All Sports, Slam, Outside, Golf Digest, Runner's, Auto Bild, Women's Health and MiLK.

In 2006, two years before the Beijing Summer Olympics, the Beijing headquarters of Titan Sports Media Group was established.

In April 2009, Qu Youyuan, the chief editor and part owner of the Titan Media Group, along with a deputy involved in accounting, were taken from their Beijing office and detained by Communist Party disciplinary authorities in Hunan. The action was reportedly related to bribery charges leveled against former sports-authority officials Fu Guoliang and Huang Ying, both arrested for corruption in 2008.

In 2015, Titan Sports Media Group launched its subsidiary and mobile app Titan Sports Plus, as its online news platform. Titan Sports Plus is also the locomotive of the development of Titan Sports Media Group in multi-media and sports industries.
