= Xiaoli, Hebei =

Xiaoli 小里镇
- Town
- Interactive map of Xiaoli
- Coordinates: 39°00′00″N 115°48′17″E
- Country: People's Republic of China
- Province: Hebei
- Prefecture-level city: Baoding
- County: Rongcheng
- Elevation: 15 m (49 ft)
- Time zone: UTC+8 (China Standard)
- Area code: 0412

Xiaoli (Chinese: 小里; pinyin: Xiǎolǐ) is a town in Rongcheng County in central Hebei province, China, located around 7 kilometres (4.3 mi) southwest of the county seat and 30 kilometres (19 mi) northeast of downtown Baoding. As of 2011, it has 10 villages under its administration.

== See also ==
- List of township-level divisions of Hebei
