= The Economic Observer =

Chinese economic newspaper

- Native name: 经济观察报
- Type: Weekly newspaper
- Founded: April 2001
- Language: Chinese, English
- Website: www.eeo.com.cn

The Economic Observer (simplified Chinese: 经济观察报; traditional Chinese: 經濟觀察報; pinyin: jīngjìguānchá bào) is a weekly Chinese language newspaper published in China since April 2001. The newspaper is considered one of the top three economic-focused newspapers in China and is well regarded for its in-depth special features and commentary.

Inspired by the British Financial Times, as of September 2001, the Economic Observer has also been printed on salmon/peach-colored paper. Although the newspaper's editorial offices are based in Beijing, the newspaper is actually registered in Ji'nan, the capital of Shandong province.

The Economic Observer Online was relaunched in March 2007 and offers subscribers access to all the newspaper's content. However, most of the articles from each week's newspaper also appear on the website at no charge, along with web-only content, which includes commentary and op-ed pieces from guest columnists.

The newspaper's English-language website, features select translations from the weekly newspaper and the website; it also publishes original reporting and interviews.

== Overview ==
The paper is distributed on Saturday mornings but the official publication date is printed as the following Monday.

Each issue is 56 pages and sells for 5 Chinese yuan or 10 Hong Kong dollars.

The newspaper's slogan is "rationality and constructiveness" (Chinese: 理性，建设性; pinyin: lǐxìng, jiànshèxìng).

== History ==
Founded in August 2000, the Economic Observer began as a small news publication dedicated to supporting China's market liberalization and reporting on socioeconomic and political events with a stated commitment to journalistic integrity. The first issue was published in April 2001 and was 24 pages. By December 2006, the newspaper had expanded to the current 56 pages.

=== Sections ===
The Economic Observer features seven regular sections: News, Nation, Market, Corporation, Automobile/Property, Observer, Lifestyle/Business Review.

=== Style ===
The Economic Observer is considered to take a noticeably independent approach to reporting the news in China.

The newspaper also has a reputation for being "pro-business" and in favor of the continuation of market reforms.

==== Joint Copenhagen Editorial ====
On 7 December 2009, The Economic Observer was one of only two Chinese newspapers to publish a common editorial with 55 other newspaper around the world calling for action from the world leaders gathering in Copenhagen for the UN's climate change summit. The idea for a common editorial was hatched by the British newspaper The Guardian.

==== Hukou Editorial ====
In March 2010, The Economic Observer published an editorial calling on representatives of China's legislature to adopt reforms to the country's household registration system. In an unprecedented move, the editorial was also simultaneously published by 13 other Chinese newspapers.

The editorial was headlined, "Request for Representatives at the Two Meetings to Hasten Reform of the Household Registration System".

A report in the New York Times said that one of the editors involved, Deputy Editor of the Economic Observer Online Zhang Hong, was removed from his position as punishment for his role in the publishing the editorial.

According to an article on the Wall Street Journal's China Real Time Blog, Zhang Hong hatched the plan to publish an editorial in collaboration with other media outlets after taking part in the Guardian's "Copenhagen" editorial the previous year (see above).

==== Wenzhou Train Crash ====
On 30 July 2011, a week after 40 people were killed in a high speed train collision near Wenzhou, the newspaper ignored a government censorship directive to publish an eight-page feature on the crash. The front-page story was presented as a letter to 2-year old survivor Xiang Weiyi, whose parents were killed. It described two images of China, "one blossoming in the midst of the people, the other hidden in officialdom," and pledged "to advocate and act" for the people's rights.

==== Reforming the Ministry of Railways ====
The newspaper was fined and issued a warning over an inaccurate report published in June 2012 that said the Ministry of Railways may be reformed. Authorities revoked the press pass of the reporter who wrote the story. The article claimed that the ministry may lose control of investment, construction and railway operations. It said the ministry would establish and inject assets into three new companies, which would be overseen by the State-Owned Assets Supervision and Administration Commission.

== Ownership ==
The original investment for the newspaper came from the Sanlian Group, a diversified state-invested company based in Shandong province.

In May 2010, Xinhua Sports and Entertainment Limited sold the advertising rights and the distribution rights of the paper to private buyer Lu Zhiqiang, a real estate billionaire.

Lu Zhiqiang currently has full control of the Economic Observer.

== See also ==
- List of newspapers in the People's Republic of China
- Media of the People's Republic of China
