= Fujian Daily =

Chinese Communist Party newspaper

Fujian Daily (Chinese: 福建日报) is the official newspaper of the Fujian Provincial Committee of the Chinese Communist Party. It was established on August 25, 1949.

== History ==
On May 25, 1949, during deliberations on the establishment of the Fujian Provincial Committee of the Chinese Communist Party, the East China Bureau of the Central Committee of the Chinese Communist Party resolved to publish two party newspapers following the liberation of Fujian: Fujian Daily, serving as the official organ of the Fujian Provincial CCP Committee, and Xiamen Daily, functioning as the official organ of the Xiamen Municipal CCP Committee. It was requested that Shu Tong, then a member of the Standing Committee of the East China Bureau and Minister of Publicity, compose the headers for both newspapers. The zinc plate was transferred to Ye Wei of the News Squadron of the East China Military Service Corps of the People's Liberation Army, who was ready to proceed southward to deliver the zinc plate to Fujian.

The heading of Fujian Daily was engraved by Mao Zedong in late 1964. The Fujian Daily Newspaper Group was created on August 25, 2002. The Fujian Daily Newspaper Group encompasses 11 newspapers, including Strait News and Strait Daobao (established in Xiamen on March 9, 1999), 12 periodicals, including Cross-Strait Media, and over 120 websites and new media platforms, such as Southeast Net and New Fujian.

In 2018, the newspaper was chosen for the 2017 National Top 100 Newspaper List.
