= Rongcheng County =

Rongcheng County 容城县 Jungcheng
- County
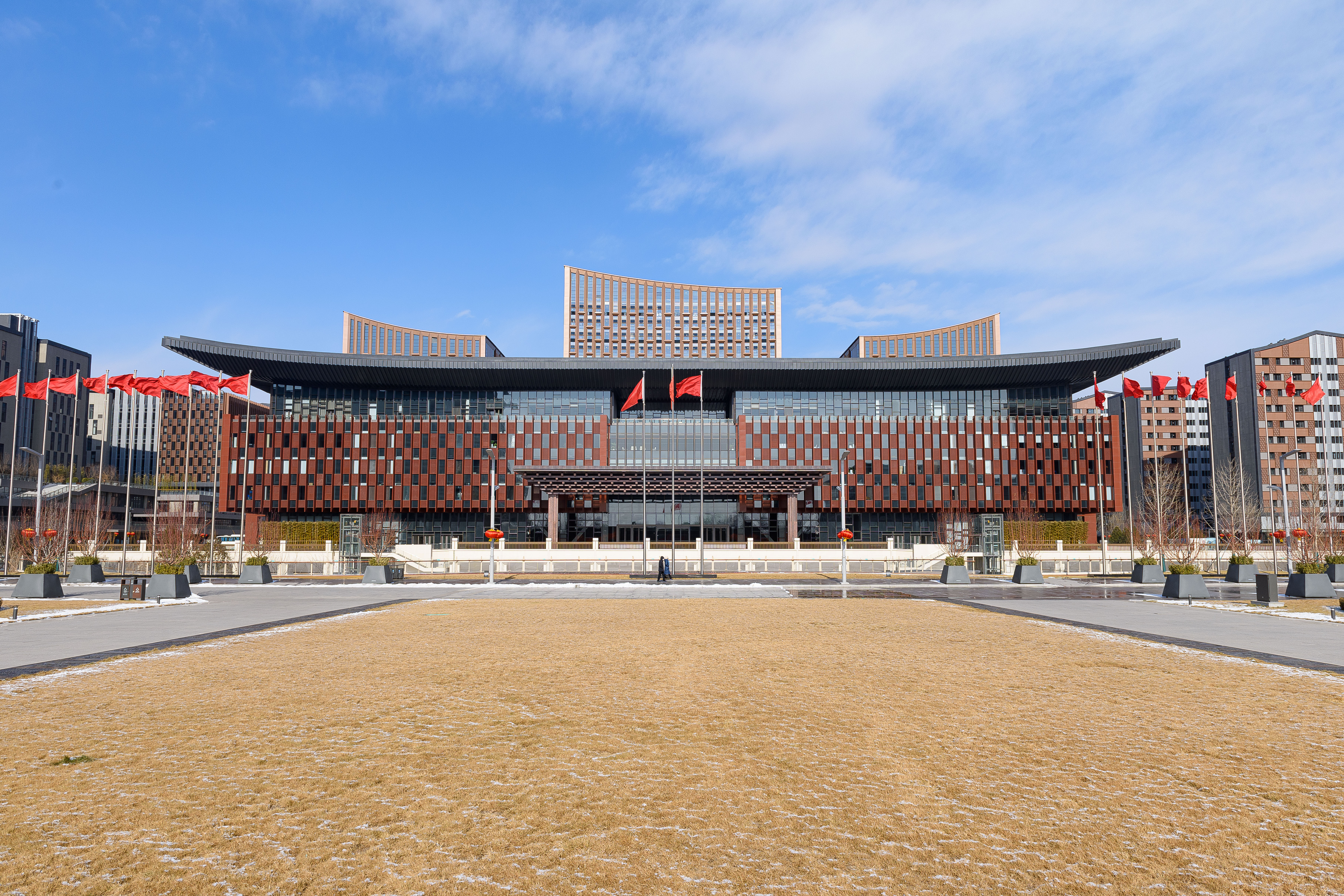
- Xiong'an Business and Service Convention Center in January 2023

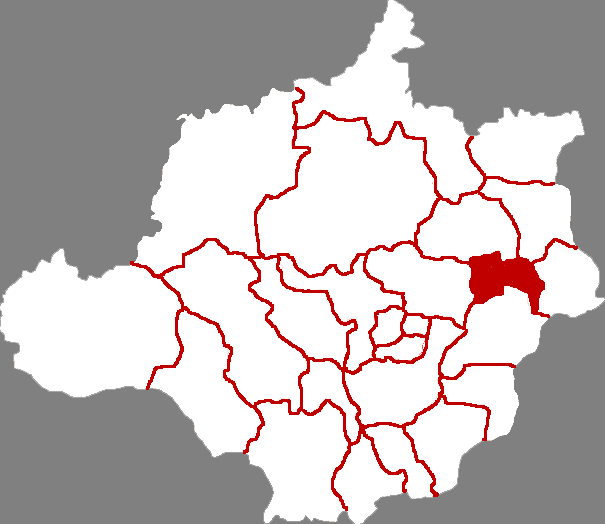
- Location in Baoding

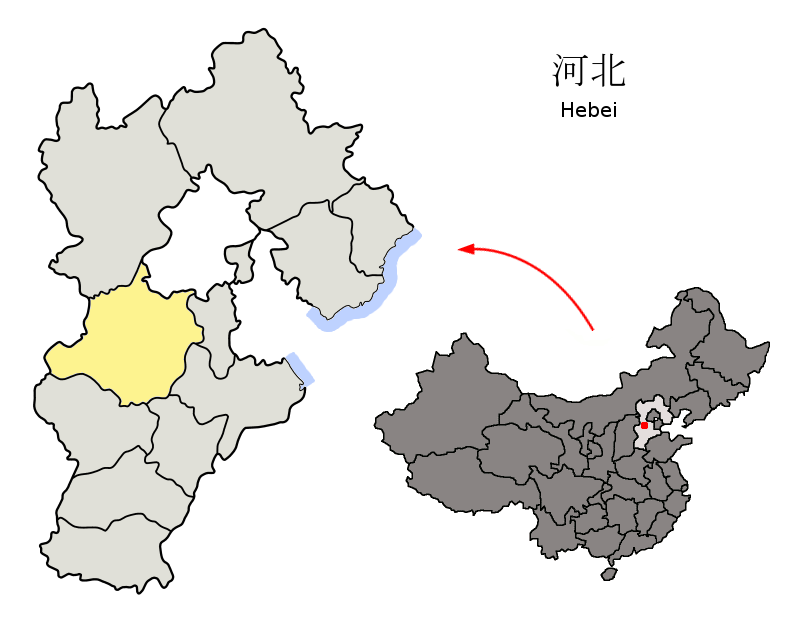
- Baoding in Hebei
- Coordinates: 39°02′35″N 115°51′43″E
- Country: People's Republic of China
- Province: Hebei
- Prefecture-level city: Baoding
- County seat: Rongcheng Town (容城镇)

Area
  - Total: 311 km^{2} (120 sq mi)
- Elevation: 16 m (52 ft)

Population (2020 census)
  - Total: 273,164
  - Density: 878/km^{2} (2,270/sq mi)
- Time zone: UTC+8 (China Standard)
- Postal code: 071700

Rongcheng (Chinese: 容城; pinyin: Róngchéng) is a county in central Hebei province, China. It is under the jurisdiction of Baoding prefecture-level city. The area of the county is 311 km^{2} (120 sq mi), while the county seat is located in Rongcheng Town.

== Transport ==
- Baiyangdian railway station

== Administrative divisions ==
Rongcheng County administers 5 towns (镇) and 3 townships (乡):

Towns:

- Rongcheng (容城镇), Xiaoli (小里镇), Nanzhang (南张镇), Dahe (大河镇), Liangmatai (晾马台镇)

Townships:

- Bayu Township (八于乡), Jiaguang Township (贾光乡), Pingwang Township (平王乡)

== Climate ==
Climate data for Rongcheng, elevation 13 m (43 ft), (1991–2020 normals, extremes 1981–present)
Month	Jan	Feb	Mar	Apr	May	Jun	Jul	Aug	Sep	Oct	Nov	Dec	Year
Record high °C (°F)	16.8 (62.2)	20.6 (69.1)	30.6 (87.1)	33.6 (92.5)	37.8 (100.0)	40.2 (104.4)	41.2 (106.2)	37.7 (99.9)	35.1 (95.2)	31.3 (88.3)	23.0 (73.4)	15.3 (59.5)	41.2 (106.2)
Mean daily maximum °C (°F)	2.4 (36.3)	6.6 (43.9)	13.8 (56.8)	21.4 (70.5)	27.3 (81.1)	31.6 (88.9)	32.2 (90.0)	30.6 (87.1)	26.8 (80.2)	19.9 (67.8)	10.5 (50.9)	3.8 (38.8)	18.9 (66.0)
Daily mean °C (°F)	−3.7 (25.3)	0.2 (32.4)	7.3 (45.1)	14.9 (58.8)	20.9 (69.6)	25.4 (77.7)	27.2 (81.0)	25.6 (78.1)	20.7 (69.3)	13.4 (56.1)	4.7 (40.5)	−1.9 (28.6)	12.9 (55.2)
Mean daily minimum °C (°F)	−8.6 (16.5)	−4.9 (23.2)	1.6 (34.9)	8.7 (47.7)	14.7 (58.5)	19.8 (67.6)	22.8 (73.0)	21.5 (70.7)	15.7 (60.3)	8.2 (46.8)	0.1 (32.2)	−6.2 (20.8)	7.8 (46.0)
Record low °C (°F)	−22.2 (−8.0)	−18.4 (−1.1)	−10.6 (12.9)	−2.3 (27.9)	4.3 (39.7)	10.3 (50.5)	16.4 (61.5)	13.2 (55.8)	5.8 (42.4)	−3.7 (25.3)	−10.3 (13.5)	−23.4 (−10.1)	−23.4 (−10.1)
Average precipitation mm (inches)	2.2 (0.09)	5.7 (0.22)	8.3 (0.33)	22.8 (0.90)	29.5 (1.16)	58.8 (2.31)	159.9 (6.30)	114.0 (4.49)	48.6 (1.91)	28.5 (1.12)	13.5 (0.53)	2.1 (0.08)	493.9 (19.44)
Average precipitation days (≥ 0.1 mm)	1.7	1.9	2.9	4.5	5.7	8.4	12.2	10.3	6.3	4.7	3.2	1.4	63.2
Average snowy days	2.6	2.1	0.9	0.1	0	0	0	0	0	0	1.4	2.4	9.5
Average relative humidity (%)	56	51	48	52	56	61	73	78	72	67	66	61	62
Mean monthly sunshine hours	144.2	157.5	200.4	222.8	246.3	209.4	174.3	186.7	186.4	173.9	142.5	138.0	2,182.4
Percentage possible sunshine	47	52	54	56	55	47	39	45	51	51	48	47	49
Source: China Meteorological Administration all-time extreme temperature
