= China Economic Times =

Simplified Chinese daily newspaper

- Native name: 中国经济时报
- Type: Daily newspaper
- Format: Broadsheet
- Publisher: China Economic Times Agency
- Founded: November 1, 1994
- Language: Chinese
- Headquarters: Beijing
- OCLC number: 1160194140
- Website: www.cet.com.cn

China Economic Times (Chinese: 中国经济时报), sometimes abbreviated as CET, also known as Zhongguo Jingji shibao, is a simplified Chinese newspaper published in the People's Republic of China. The paper is a comprehensive daily newspaper focusing on the economy, inaugurated in Beijing on 1 November 1994, and is sponsored by the Development Research Center of the State Council.

== CCPPD banned CET reporter Pang Jiaoming ==
In October 2007, Pang Jiaoming (庞皎明), an investigative reporter of the China Economic Times was asked to be fired by the Central Propaganda Department of the Chinese Communist Party for publishing an embarrassing report on the state of China's railway infrastructure before the "sensitive" 17th National Congress of the Chinese Communist Party. Under pressure from the Central Propaganda Department, Pang was fired and banned from journalism. But, he later changed his name to "Shangguan Jiaoming" (上官敫铭) and entered the in-depth news department of the Southern Metropolis Daily.
