= Dahe Daily =

Simplified Chinese newspaper

- Founded: August 1, 1995; 31 years ago
- Language: Chinese
- City: Zhengzhou, Henan
- Country: China
- Website: www.dahebao.cn

Dahe Daily (pinyin: Dàhé Bào) is a Chinese newspaper based in Zhengzhou, Henan, established on August 1, 1995 by the Henan Daily Newspaper Group of the Henan Provincial Committee of the Chinese Communist Party. The original name of Dahe Daily was Dahe Wen Hui Bao, and it was officially renamed Dahe Daily on October 1, 1997. The newspaper is positioned as "gathering diverse things from all over the world and entering the homes of ordinary people", with the purpose of "caring for people's livelihoods, advocating fashion, being close to life, and serving the public".

It is one of the most representative media in Henan Province. Its daily circulation was 600,000 in 2003, ranking 16th in China and 99th in the world, and reached one million in 2006. As the number one brand in the Central Plains newspaper market, it has been selected five times as one of the Top 100 World Daily Publishers.

Dahe Daily produces 80 pages in four volumes every day, including 64 pages nationwide and 16 pages in the provincial capital city of Zhengzhou. The newspaper is only printed with color printing, It is the favorite local urban newspaper among the people of Henan.

National version: Based on the Central Plains and facing the whole country, by paying attention to major social, economic, livelihood, political, military, cultural, life, sports and other news events happening at home and abroad, promoting national justice and criticizing current shortcomings.

Provincial Capital Zhengzhou City Special Edition: By focusing on the provincial capital, focusing on Zhengzhou, reporting on news and trivial matters around the people, tracking fashion hot topics, paying attention to people's livelihoods, advocating consumption, and taking advantage of Zhengzhou and Bian, it began to cover the Kaifeng market and serve readers in both cities in March 2007, further expanding its influence.

Dahe Daily · Dahe Wealth, as a financial weekly magazine created by Dahe Daily (Sunday newspaper, Thursday release), focuses on financial dynamics, examines economic trends, reviews successful and unsuccessful cases of enterprises, pays attention to the entrepreneurial community, and demonstrates entrepreneurial spirit. It has the characteristics of large amount of information, strong readability, and high reading rate, covering Henan Province with high density. The daily circulation in China reaches 1 million copies, while in Zhengzhou, 400000 copies are distributed daily, with an annual advertising revenue of 430 million yuan. It has become the first brand in the Central Plains newspaper market and has ranked among the top 100 world daily circulation companies. Its comprehensive competitiveness ranks fourth in China's newspaper industry.
