= Titan Sports (newspaper) =

Simplified Chinese newspaper

- The front page of Titan Sports on 17 November 2016
- Type: Semi-weekly newspaper
- Format: Tabloid
- Owner(s): Titan Sports Media Group
- Founded: 1988
- Language: Chinese
- Headquarters: Changsha and Beijing
- Website: www.titan24.com

Titan Sports (Chinese: 体坛周报) is a Chinese sports newspaper, operated by the Titan Sports Media Group. It is the most circulated sports newspaper in China.

== History ==
=== 1988-2000 ===
Titan Sports was founded in 1988 as a sports newspaper owned and operated by Hunan Sports General Association. On 3 December 1990, Titan Sports started a new column, "European Leagues Round-up", which meant that it became the first Chinese newspaper keeping track of European football. In May 1992, Titan Sports launched continuous coverage of the 1992 NBA Finals with its column "Up to date: The Final Chapter of NBA", as the first Chinese media outlet reporting National Basketball Association games in the form of continuous coverage. In 1994, Titan Sports started keeping track of Chinese domestic league Jia A after its foundation.

In the market competition of Chinese newspapers in the late 1990s, Titan Sports gradually exceeded other sports newspapers in China in circulation and in public influence. During the Sydney 2000 Summer Olympics, its circulation surpassed 2 million per issue.

=== 2001: World Cup qualifying ===
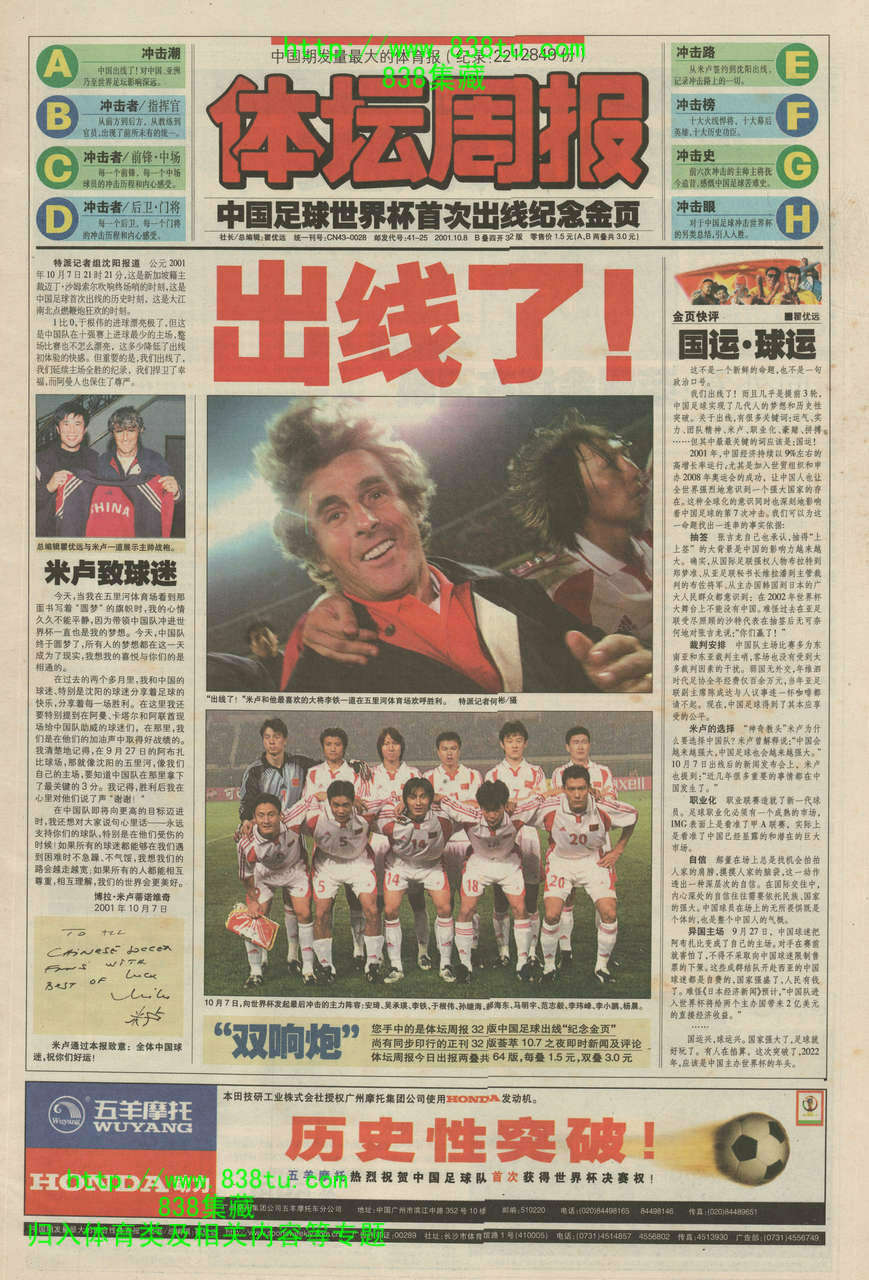
Titan Sports on 8 October 2001

The 2002 World Cup qualifying rounds became the major focus of Titan Sports after the 2000 Summer Olympics, in 2001. China was attempting to qualify; that year average per issue circulation of Titan Sports was 1.6 million. On 7 October 2001, China defeated Oman 1:0 in Shenyang to qualify for the 2002 World Cup, its first time qualifying for the World Cup. The issue of Titan Sports on 8 October 2001 had a record-breaking circulation of 2.6 million. It is still a record in the history of newspaper publication in China.

=== 2001-2008 ===
After the 2002 World Cup, the next major opportunity for Titan Sports was the Beijing 2008 Summer Olympics. In order to prepare for reporting on the Olympics and to expand its market share and influence, Titan Sports opened a Beijing Bureau in 2005, as a second headquarters of Titan Sports Media Group apart from its original base in Changsha.

=== 2008-present ===
During the Olympic year of 2008, Titan Sports developed its multi-media platforms in response to the changes in how Chinese people receive and read sports news. On 1 May 2008, three months before the opening of the Summer Olympics, titan24.com was built as the official website of Titan Sports. In October 2015, Titan Sports Plus was created as the mobile app of Titan Sports Media Group, via which articles from Titan Sports are also selectively published.

== Partnership ==
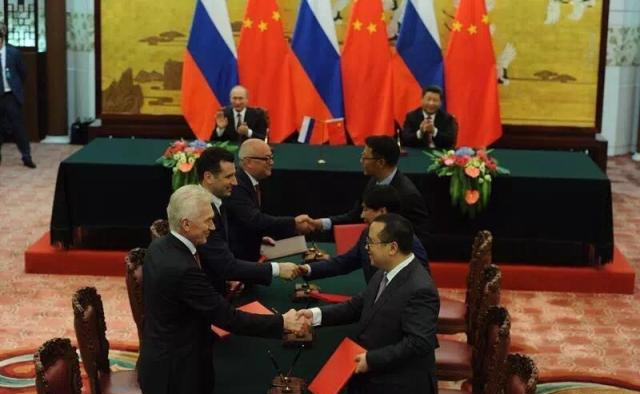
Titan Sports and Sovetsky Sport signed a memorandum of understanding in the Great Hall of the People in Beijing on 25 June 2016.

Titan Sports is the first sports newspaper in China developing partnerships and cooperation overseas. It is now a partner of a number of well-known sports media outlets including L'Équipe, Sovetsky Sport, La Gazzetta dello Sport, Kicker and Marca.

== Awards ==
In 2012, Titan Sports founded Best Footballer in Asia, an annual prize presented to the best football player to have played for an Asian national football team or Asian football club during the preceding year. It has been presented since 2013, as the most influential football prize in Asia apart from the annual prizes awarded by AFC.
