= Shanghai Star =

English-language newspaper from China

- Simplified Chinese: 上海英文星报
- Traditional Chinese: 上海英文星報
Transcriptions
Standard Mandarin
- Hanyu Pinyin: Shànghǎi Yīngwén Xīngbào

Shanghai Star (上海英文星报) was a weekly English-language newspaper published in Shanghai, China, between 1992 and 2006. It was owned and run by its parent, the Beijing-based China Daily.
