= Henan Business Daily =

Chinese newspaper

- Traditional Chinese: 河南商報
- Simplified Chinese: 河南商报
Transcriptions
Standard Mandarin
- Hanyu Pinyin: Hénánshāngbào
- Wade–Giles: ho nan shang pao
Yue: Cantonese
- Yale Romanization: ho^{4}naam^{4}seung^{1}bou^{3}

Henan Business Daily (simplified Chinese: 河南商报; traditional Chinese: 河南商報; pinyin: Hénánshāngbào) is overseen and sponsored by Henan Daily Newspaper Group. It is a comprehensive metropolitan daily newspaper that was first published in 1983. Henan Business Daily currently publishes 48 pages in broadsheet format daily and is distributed throughout Henan Province. It is currently the second largest newspaper in terms of circulation in the provincial capital, Zhengzhou.

Henan Business Daily
- Type: Daily newspaper
- Format: Broadsheet
- Owner(s): Henan Daily Newspaper Group
- Founded: July 1985
- Language: Chinese
- Headquarters: 22nd Floor, Building 2, Zhengshang Jingkai Plaza, Intersection of Hanghai East Road and Ninth Street, East Economic and Technological Development Zone, Zhengzhou, Henan Province
- Website: newpaper.dahe.cn/hnsb

== History ==
In August 1983, Henan Business Daily was founded.

In July 1997, it was officially converted into a comprehensive metropolitan newspaper. Henan Business Daily was once affiliated with the Henan Second Light Industry Bureau, the Henan Department of Commerce, and the Henan Branch of Xinhua News Agency.

On September 1, 2004, it came under the supervision and sponsorship of Henan Daily Newspaper Group.

On July 1, 2007, Henan Business Daily was revamped, becoming a metropolitan newspaper with a financial focus.
