= Economic Daily =

Chinese Communist Party newspaper

- Type: Daily newspaper
- Owner: Publicity Department of the Chinese Communist Party
- Founder: State Council
- Publisher: Economic Daily Press
- Founded: January 1, 1983
- Political alignment: Chinese Communist Party
- Language: Chinese
- Headquarters: 2 Baizhifang East Street, Xicheng District, Beijing
- Website: www.ce.cn

Economic Daily
- Simplified Chinese: 经济日报
Transcriptions

The Economic Daily is a Chinese state-owned newspaper focusing on economic reports. Founded in Beijing on January 1, 1983, the newspaper is managed by the Publicity Department of the Chinese Communist Party. The Economic Daily is pro-business, and the tone is conservative.

== History ==
The newspaper was first published on 1 January 1983.

In 1984, Deng Xiaoping wrote an inscription for the Economic Daily.

In March 2018, Economic Daily won the Third National Top 100 Newspapers in China.

In October 2020, the United States Department of State designated the Economic Daily as a foreign mission of China.

=== Hoax ===
On January 28, 1993, Economic Daily published an article entitled Can Water Really Become Gasoline? —— A Record of Private Entrepreneur Wang Hongcheng and His Invention (水真能变成油吗?——记民营企业家王洪成与他的发明). The article, written by Economic Daily reporters Wu Hongbo (吴红博) and Liu Donghua (刘东华), praised the "invention" of Wang Hongcheng (王洪成) for transforming water into gasoline as "China's fifth greatest invention" (中国第五大发明) after the traditional Four Great Inventions. However, the water-to-gasoline technology (水变油技术) was later deemed a hoax and pseudoscience, and in 1998, its initiator, Wang Hongcheng, was sentenced to 10 years in prison.

== Organization ==
The Economic Daily is published by the Economic Daily Press, a deputy-ministerial-level institution. It is managed by the Publicity Department of the Chinese Communist Party.
