= Hainan Daily =

Simplified Chinese newspaper

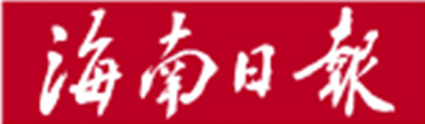
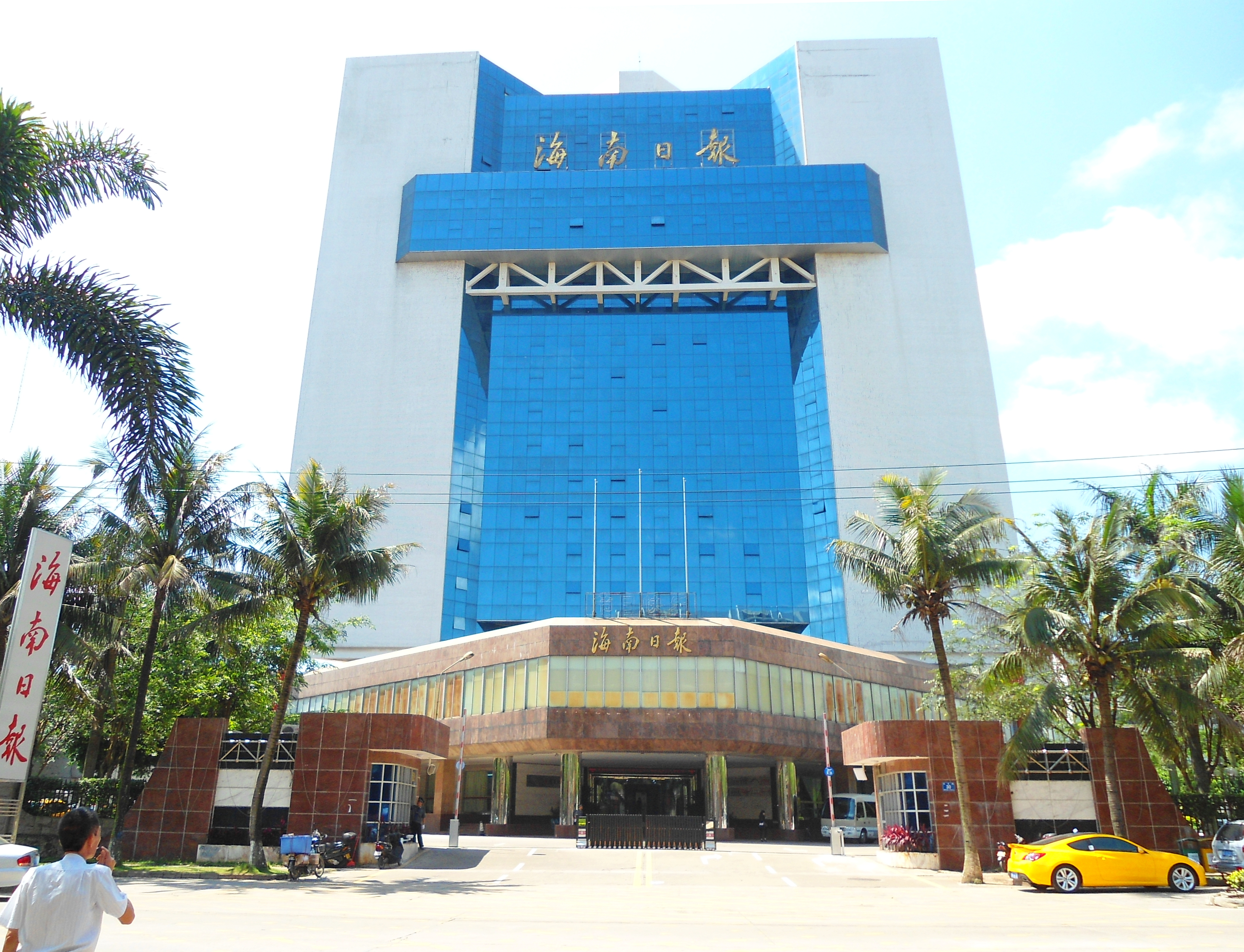
- Native name: 海南日报
- Type: Daily newspaper
- Publisher: Hainan Daily Press Group
- Founded: May 7, 1950
- Political alignment: Chinese Communist Party
- Language: Chinese
- Headquarters: Haikou, Hainan
- Website: hndaily.cn

The Hainan Daily or Hainan Ribao (simplified Chinese: 海南日报; traditional Chinese: 海南日報; pinyin: Hǎinán rìbào) is a Chinese language daily newspaper published in Hainan Province, People's Republic of China. Founded as the organ of the Hainan Provincial Committee of the Chinese Communist Party (中共海南省委机关报), it was established on May 7, 1950, formerly known as New Hainan Post (新海南报), which was renamed to its current name in 1958.

In January 1991, Hainan Daily launched the Hainan Daily Overseas Edition (海南日报海外版), for an overseas audience, focusing on Southeast Asia, introducing the policies of Hainan (海南经济特区) and the investment environment and other information.

Following reform and opening up, in July 2004, Hainan Daily was privatised and became part of the Hainan Daily Press Group (海南日报报业集团). This group also operates the online news service hinews.cn in simplified Chinese, which in 2009 won a national prize for innovative website development.

== See also ==
- Nanguo Metropolis Daily, Hainan's other major daily newspaper
