= List of prisons in Shanghai =

Below is a list of prisons within Shanghai in the People's Republic of China.

Name	Enterprise name	City/County/District	Village/Town	Established	Notes
Baimaoling Prison	Baimaoling Farm; Shanghai Baimaoling Industrial General Corp.	Xuancheng in Anhui and Shanghai			Area 45 km^{2}, held roughly 3,000 in 2000
Baoshan Prison		Baoshan District, Shanghai		1997	Held 2,000 prisoners in the end of 2000
Beixinjing Prison	Shanghai Laodong Steel Pipe Works	Changning District			Produces pipes of Yinhe brand, held over 2,000 prisoners by 2000
Jiangwan Prison	Shanghai Gas Valve General Factory (Orig. Shanghai Laodong Valve Factory)	Baoshan District, Shanghai		1958	
Qingpu Prison	Qingdong Farm			1991	Typically holds 2,500 males serving sentences of more than 7 years and less than life imprisonment. Also holds foreigners. Has capacity of 3,000 inmates
Shanghai Juvenile Offender Detachment		Songjiang District	Sijing		Manual labor takes place there
Shanghai Nanhui Prison			Zhoupu	2007	Can hold up to 2,100 inmates
Shanghai New Criminal’s Prison				1996	In 2000 held 700 inmates
Shanghai Women’s Prison		Songjiang District	Sijing	1996	Holds more than 1,000 inmates
Tilanqiao Prison (Shanghai Municipal Prison)	Printing Factory; Clothing factory	Hongkou District		1901	
Wujiaochang Prison	Shanghai Laodong Machine Works (Now Shanghai Minxing Laodong Tool Ltd.)	Yangpu District			Detains 2,000 inmates sentenced to 15 years or less
Zhoupu Prison	Laodong Plate Glass Works		Zhoupu		At the end of 2000, it held more than 2,000 inmates. It usually holds 1,800 inmates serving sentences of 15 years or less.

- Shanghai Detention Center

== See also ==
- Penal system in China
- Shanghai Municipal Prison Administration
- Shanghai Municipal Public Security Bureau
