= Shanghai United Media Group =

State-owned media company of China

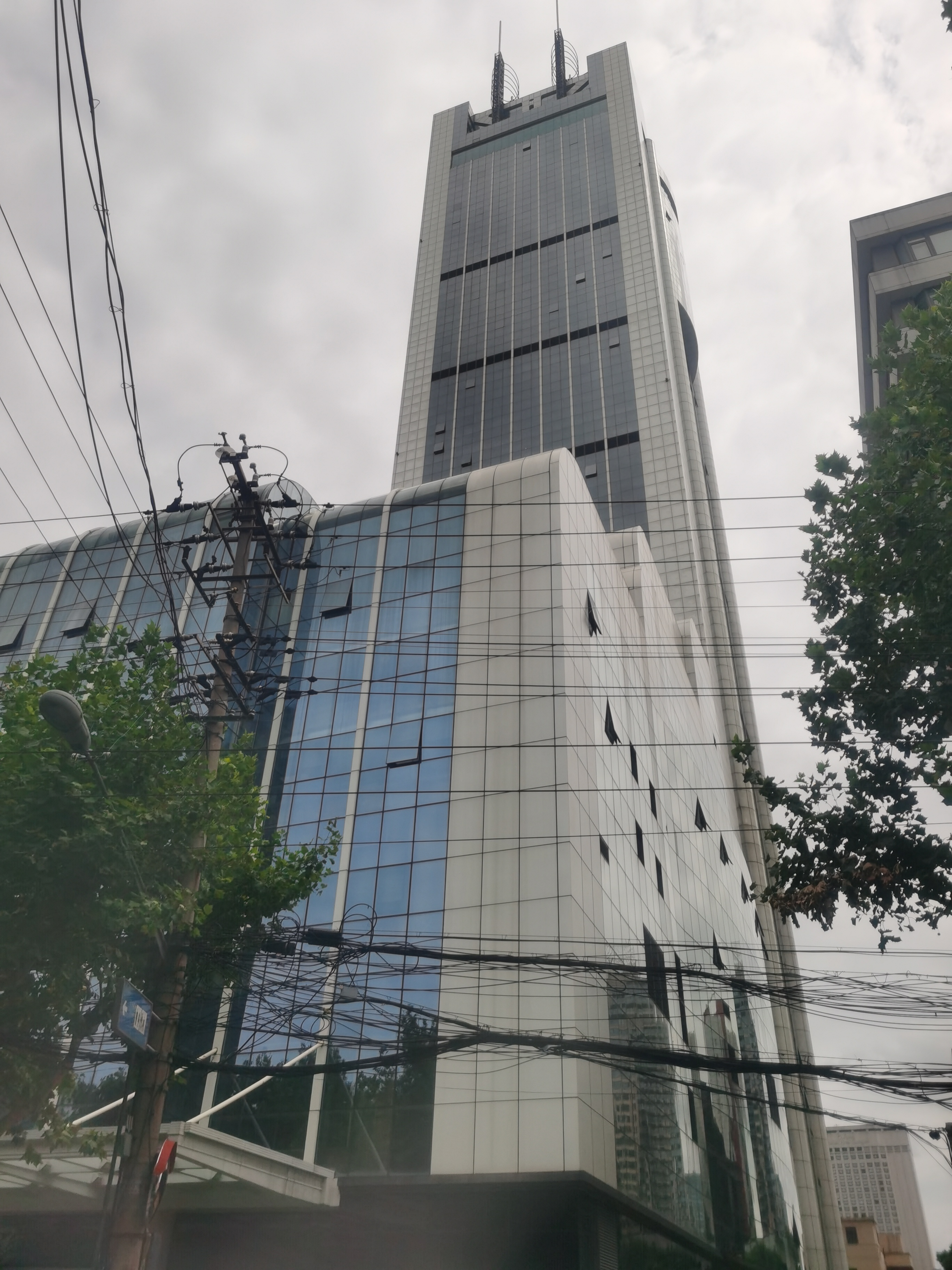
- Headquarters of Shanghai United Media Group
- Formation: October 28, 2013; 12 years ago
- Type: State media
- Headquarters: 755 Weihai Road, Jing'an District, Shanghai
- Parent organization: Shanghai Municipal Committee of the Chinese Communist Party
- Website: www.sumg.com.cn

Shanghai United Media Group
- Simplified Chinese: 上海报业集团
- Traditional Chinese: 上海報業集團
Transcriptions
Standard Mandarin
- Hanyu Pinyin: Shànghǎi Bàoyè Jítuán

The Shanghai United Media Group (SUMG) is a state media company of the People's Republic of China overseen by the Shanghai Municipal Committee of the Chinese Communist Party (CCP). The headquarter of the Group is located at 755 Weihai Road in Shanghai.

== History ==
On the afternoon of September 2, 2013, Han Zheng, then Secretary of the CCP Shanghai Municipal Committee convened a special meeting in the conference room of the Municipal Committee to address the reform of the newspaper industry in Shanghai. Approved on October 28, 2013, the CCP Shanghai Municipal Committee officially established the Shanghai United Media Group, with Han Zheng unveiling its plaque. Qiu Xin, previously the director of Shanghai Radio and Television Station and president of Shanghai Oriental Media Group, has been appointed president of SUMG; Gao Yunfei (media), former vice president of Wenhui–Xinmin United Press Group (Chinese: 文汇新民集团), has been appointed vice president and general manager; and Cheng Feng, former chairman of Shanghai State-owned Assets Management Company (Chinese: 上海国资经营公司), has been appointed vice president and deputy general manager of SUMG. Following the formation of the SUMG, the three principal newspapers, Jiefang Daily, Wen Wei Po, and Xinmin Evening News, reinstated their legal entity status.

Following the merger and establishment of the SUMG, the News Evening Post, Oriental Morning Post, and other newspapers were suspended. Concurrently, 2,404 people underwent triage, and long-term losses along with insolvent, inefficient assets were eliminated. On January 1, 2014, its Jiefang Daily new media initiative, Shanghai Observatory (subsequently renamed Shanghai Observer), was officially launched. On January 16, the SUMG invested in financial and economic new media projects, acquiring shares with China Mobile, Hony Capital, and others, under the leadership of He Li's team. The overarching concept was a "cultural and financial platform," subsequently launched as Jiemian News. In July 2014, the new media project The Paper was introduced, followed by the launch of several additional new media platforms.

In January 2017, Shanghai Printing Group, previously associated with SUMG, was moved to Shanghai Century Publishing Group. On May 29, 2020, the Shanghai Municipal State-owned Assets Supervision and Administration Commission (SASAC) transferred 43.63% of eastday.com's shares, previously held by the Shanghai Municipal People's Government, to the SUMG without compensation.

In October 2020, the United States Department of State designated Jiefang Daily and Xinmin Evening News as foreign missions of the Chinese government.

In June 2022, the Shanghai United Media Group launched an "Integrated Media Studio Empowerment Plan" in concert with ByteDance and Tencent to develop domestic and foreign influencers.

In October 2023, the Shanghai United Media Group launched an international communication center called the Shanghai Global News Network (SGNN). It operates social media accounts under the ShanghaiEye brand.

On November 11, 2024, Shanghai Newspaper Group declared the official commencement of a reform plan. Commencing January 1, 2025, Jiefang Daily, Wen Wei Po, and New People's Evening News migrated to the Shanghai Observer. Literature News was integrated into Wen Wei Po and the Literature persisted in paper publication while also transitioning to the online platform.

== Publications ==
There are a variety of publications under the Shanghai United Press Group, including:

- Jiefang Daily
- Shanghai Students' Post
- Shanghai Law Journal
- Shanghai Xinmin Evening News
- Wenhui Daily
- Shanghai Daily
- Xinmin Weekly
- Oriental Sports Daily
- Wenhui Book Review
- Xinmin Evening News
- Sixth Tone
- Oriental Morning Post
- Xinmin Evening News Family Weekly
- Wen Xue Bao
- The Journalist Monthly
- Shanghai Yueji
- Shanghai Dongfang Newspaper
- The Paper

== Subsidiaries ==
- Xinhua Media (founded in 2006)
- Shanghai Sanlian Bookstore
- Wenhui Publishing House
- Oriental Art Center
- City Animation
- Shanghai Cultural Property Rights Exchange

== See also ==
- List of newspapers in China
