= Shangguan News =

Chinese daily news platform

- Native name: 上观新闻
- Romanized name: Shàngguān xīnwén
- Website type: News website
- Available in: Simplified Chinese
- Parent: Jiefang Daily
- Website: www.shobserver.com
- Registration: Optional (required for comments)
- Launched: Jiefang Daily website: July 28, 1998; 28 years ago Shanghai Observer: January 1, 2014; 12 years ago Merged as Shangguan News: December 2016; 9 years ago

Shangguan News is a digital news platform and the official website of Jiefang Daily, a major Shanghai newspaper. Launched in 1998 as the online version of Jiefang Daily, it evolved into the Shanghai Observer mobile app in 2014 before rebranding as Shangguan News in 2016, merging with its parent site. On January 1, 2025, it integrated the mobile apps of Jiefang Daily, Wenhui Daily, and Xinmin Evening News into a unified platform.

== History ==
Shangguan News traces its origins to the Jiefang Daily website, launched on July 28, 1998, as an electronic version of the newspaper. Initially named Jiefang Network and later Jiefang Niu Network, it provided daily articles from Jiefang Daily and its subsidiaries, such as News Report, Shenjiang Service Guide, and Shanghai Fiction, alongside special reports and service columns.

On December 10, 2013, Jiefang Daily introduced Shanghai Observer, a new mobile app that began a trial run and officially launched on January 1, 2014. Initially a paid service targeting Shanghai’s officials, urban stakeholders, and global audiences interested in the city, it offered 8–10 daily articles on weekdays, covering politics, economics, culture, and history. Content was shared via mobile devices, websites, Weibo, and WeChat, with select articles republished by outlets like People's Daily and Tencent. A monthly print selection of 25 articles, distributed to government offices, complemented the digital offerings.

In March 2016, Jiefang Daily restructured, redirecting all reporting resources to Shanghai Observer, which became free and rebranded as Shangguan News. In December 2016, the Jiefang Daily website merged with Shangguan News, consolidating under the domain www.jfdaily.com. On March 2, 2017, Shangguan News partnered with China Eastern Airlines to provide daily news via in-flight Wi-Fi.

On January 1, 2025, Shangguan News unified the mobile apps of Jiefang Daily, Wenhui Daily, and Xinmin Evening News into a single platform, adopting a shared technical and editorial framework.
