= Xinmin =

Xinmin may refer to:

== China ==
- Ren Xinmin, a Chinese scientist
- Xinmin, Liaoning (新民市), county-level city of Shenyang
- Xinmin Evening News (新民晚报), newspaper published in Shanghai
- Xinmin Weekly (新民周刊), newsmagazine published in Shanghai
- Xinmin Station (新民站), current Lile Station, station of Guangzhou-Zhuhai Intercity Mass Rapid Transit

== Singapore ==
- Xinmin Secondary School (新民中学), in Hougang, Singapore
