= Joe Chung =

Hong Kong political commentator and writer

- 鍾祖康
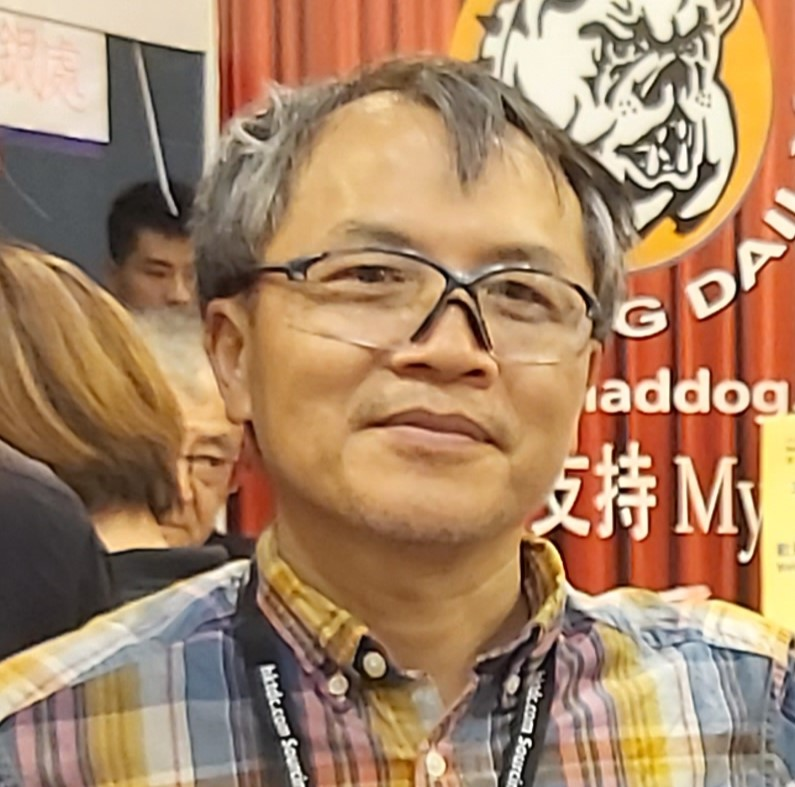
- Chung at the 2019 Hong Kong Book Fair on 20 July 2019
- Born: c. 1960; Yuen Long, New Territories, Hong Kong
- Occupations: author, journalist and China-affairs consultant
- Website: joechungvschina.blogspot.com

Joe Chung (Chinese: 鍾祖康, born 1960s) is a writer and political commentator from Hong Kong, who lives in Stavanger, Norway. He is known for his best-seller books I Don't Want to be Chinese Again and China is Stranger than Fiction, severely criticizing Chinese culture, both of which garnered support in Hong Kong and Taiwan.

== Life and career ==
Joe Chung was born in the 1960s in Hong Kong. He became concerned with Chinese politics following the imprisonment of Wei Jingsheng in 1979. In 1991 he completed his master's degree in sociology at Chinese University of Hong Kong. In the elections of 1994 and 1999 for the District Councils of Hong Kong (known as District Boards before 1997), he represented the Hong Kong Democratic Party in the geographical constituency of Wong Tai Sin but was not elected. In 2001 he openly called for independence of Taiwan and was criticised by the Chinese Communist Party as "more arrogant than Taiwan separatists". He is a frequent contributor to Hong Kong Open magazine. In 2012 he contributed several articles to the Apple Daily regarding National Education in Hong Kong and the sovereignty of the Senkaku Islands, also known as Diaoyu Island in People's Republic of China.

== Political activism ==
In the 1990s, Joe Chung was frequently active in pro-democratic approach human rights activities in Hong Kong. On 9 July 1995, Joe Chung and other activists burnt the flag of the People's Republic of China outside the offices of Xinhua in Hong Kong to protest the arrest by the Chinese authorities of Harry Wu, the Chinese penal colony researcher. On 30 November 1995, Wei Jingsheng Action Group chairman Joe Chung, accompanied by other members of the Wei Jingsheng Action Group, publicly burned a cartoon image of Chinese Communist leader Deng Xiaoping to demand the release of democracy campaigner Wei Jingsheng. The event occurred outside the office of the Xinhua News Agency in Happy Valley on Thursday, 29 November 1995. Both these events were widely reported by local media and news agencies the following day.

== Taiwan independence controversy ==
On 4 May 2000, (the anniversary of the 4 May movement), Joe Chung published an op-ed piece in the Hong Kong Ming Pao, titled "Taiwan Has the Right to Independence" (台灣有權獨立). An article in the Sing Tao published in Hong Kong on 20 May 2000 titled "鐘祖康被指【煽動分裂】親中報炮轟《明報》" (Joe Chung accused of inciting break-up of China as Communist newspapers bombard the Ming Pao) commented on the following events. According to the article, the Communist affiliated Hong Kong newspapers Ta Kung Pao and Wen Wei Po responded to Joe Chung's article with a barrage of over 20 articles in the following days with articles such as "Taiwan Has No Right to Independence" (台灣無權獨立) in the Wen Wei Po on 9 May 2000. The articles refuted Chung's arguments, accusing him of "splitting China", "contravening article 23 of the Basic Law", and being a "traitor" to China. They also attacked the Ming Pao, accusing it of breaking its promise to "publish a Chinese newspaper for Chinese people". Sing Tao Daily noted that concerted, sustained attacks by the Communist press of this ferocity had not been seen since the pre-handover 1990s when the Communist press had attacked Hong Kong Governor Chris Patten. The article also noted that Joe Chung was both glad that his article had stirred up debate, but feared for his personal safety as result. Also according to the article, Ming Pao declined to publish Joe Chung's rebuttal of these attacks, saying that enough had been said on the matter. After the publication of the Sing Tao article, the attacks continued with articles such as "Some 'Chinese People' Who Hate Their Own Country" (某些仇恨自己國家的'中國人') published in the Ta Kung Pao, on 29 May 2001.

== I Don't Want to be Chinese Again ==
Joe Chung published I Don't Want to be Chinese Again (來生不做中國人) in November 2007, which has been printed in 55 editions. According to Liberty Times, The book was written in response to the sentiment from "[a] recent online survey of Chinese people found that 65 percent of respondents would prefer not to be Chinese at all". The book severely criticized the Chinese culture.

=== Donation to Hong Kong Liaison Office ===
According to media reports, on 16 July 2012, a Hong Kong Legislative Council member, Power to the People lawmaker Albert Chan Wai Yip presented a book by Joe Chung, "I don't want to be Chinese again", to Zhang Xiaoming, director of China's Liaison Office, as an act of protest against China's central government, before boycotting a lunch meeting at the Legislative Council.

== Bibliography ==
- 高官廢話公式寶鑑—探討香港社會超穩定的語言學基礎 [On the Road to Unaccountability: the Best Paid Officials in the World Demonstrate How to Defend the Indefensible]. Hong Kong: Xiafei'er Publishing House. 2002. ISBN 962-867-563-X.
- 網上搜證寶典網上搜證寶典—附全球26名校網上資料庫效能測試報告 [Online Supersearcher's Bible : including an overall review of the databases subscribed to by 26 top universities]. Hong Kong: Xiafei'er Publishing House. 2003. ISBN 962-867-568-0.
- 來生不做中國人 [I Don't Want to be Chinese Again]. Taipei: Asian Culture Press. 2007. ISBN 978-986-7178-52-7.
- 中國比小說更離奇 [China is Stranger Than Fiction]. Taipei: Taiwan Interminds Publishing Inc. 2007. ISBN 978-986-6789-14-4.
- 中國，你憑什麼？ [China : Where is Your Pride?]. Hong Kong: People's Culture Publishing House. 2009. ISBN 978-988-1725-0-35.
- 向中國低文明說不 [Say NO to Uncivilized China]. Hong Kong: Enrich Publishing Ltd. 2014. ISBN 978-988-8292-07-3.
- 拷問中國：兼論習近平論文剽竊事證 [Interrogating China: The Evidence of Xi Jinping’s Plagiarism]. Taipei: Asian Culture Press. 2014. ISBN 978-986-5794-23-1.
