= Shanghai Students' Post =

Newspaper in People's Republic of China

- Type: Daily
- Owner: Shanghai United Media Group
- Founded: June 12, 1985
- Language: English
- Headquarters: 78 Tanjiadu Rd, Shanghai
- Website: www.sspclub.cn

Shanghai Students' Post (SSP; Chinese: 上海学生英文报) is an English-language national weekly newspaper published in Shanghai, China. Targeting secondary school students and teachers, the newspaper is published by Jiefang Daily and Shanghai Foreign Language Education Press. The newspaper was established on 12 June 1985.

A Heilongjiang People's Publishing House book said, "The articles are easy to understand being good in English and well illustrated."

== Official website ==
- Official website
