= Wen Wei Po =

Hong Kong-based Chinese language newspaper

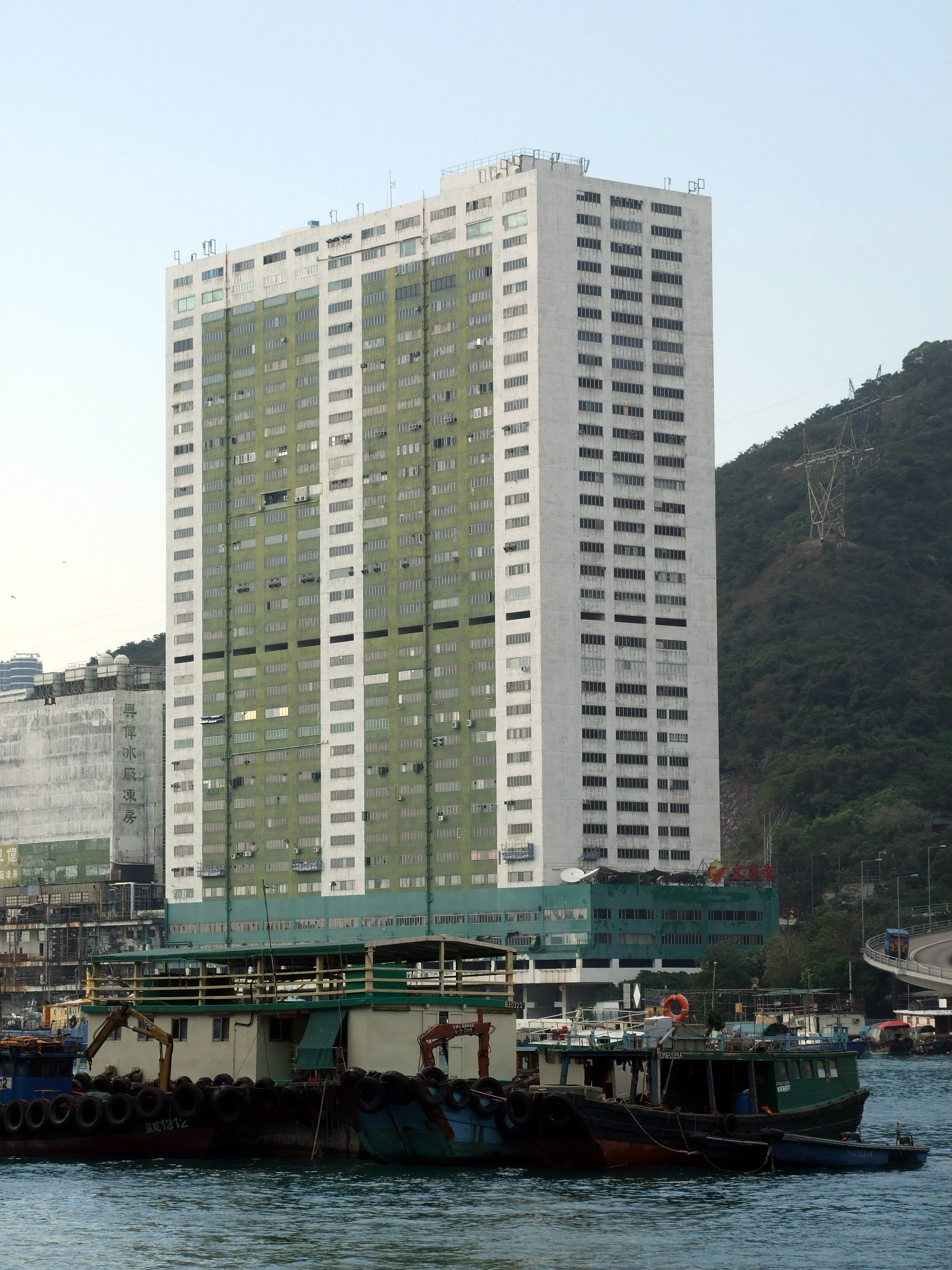
- Hing Wai Centre, the head office of Wen Wei Po
- Native name: 文匯報
- Type: daily newspaper; state media
- Format: Broadsheet
- Owner: Liaison Office of the Central Government
- Founded: 9 September 1948
- Political alignment: Pro-Beijing
- Language: Traditional Chinese
- Headquarters: Aberdeen, Hong Kong
- Website: www.wenweipo.com

Wen Wei Po
- Traditional Chinese: 文匯報
- Simplified Chinese: 文汇报
Transcriptions
Standard Mandarin
- Hanyu Pinyin: Wénhuì Bào
Yue: Cantonese
- Jyutping: man4 wui6 bou3

Wen Wei Po (Chinese: 文匯報) is a pro-Beijing state-owned newspaper based in Hong Kong. The newspaper was established in Hong Kong on 9 September 1948, 10 years after the launch of its Shanghai counterpart in 1938.

Its head office is located at the Hing Wai Centre (興偉中心) in Aberdeen, Hong Kong.

The paper is owned by Ta Kung Wen Wei Media Group, which is controlled by the liaison office of the Chinese government in Hong Kong. Wen Wei Po is subsidised by and advocates for the Chinese government. Wen Wei Po accounts for less than 1 percent of Hong Kong's readership, and is mainly read by an audience in mainland China and older Hong Kong readers.

In a 2019 public opinion survey conducted by the Chinese University of Hong Kong, Wen Wei Po was rated by respondents as the second least credible paid newspaper in Hong Kong.

== History ==
Wen Wei Po was founded in Shanghai in January 1938. The Hong Kong edition was first published on 6 September 1948.

In the 1980s, Xinhua News Agency, which served as the de facto Chinese embassy to Hong Kong, reduced its control over Wen Wei Po to reflect China's guarantee of "one country, two systems" after sovereignty over Hong Kong is transferred to China in 1997.

In 1989, Wen Wei Po published an editorial criticizing the People's Liberation Army for its crackdown of protesters in Tiananmen Square. The paper reported what it claimed was a firsthand account from a 20-year-old Tsinghua University student, whose identity was kept confidential. This account alleged that soldiers first set up over ten machine guns in front of the Heroes Monument and mass fired into the crowd of students inside Tiananmen square, and mowing them down. The New York Times gave this supposed eyewitness account prominent display on 12 June, a week after the events. However, no evidence has ever confirmed the account or the existence of the supposed witness. According to Jay Mathews writing in the Columbia Journalism Review, the story was not factual—all verified eyewitness accounts say that all students remaining in the square were allowed to leave peacefully—and that instead hundreds of workers and Beijing residents did die that night but "in a different place and different circumstances", which had included soldiers shooting many on the stretches of Chang'an Avenue, about a mile west of the square, and in scattered confrontations throughout the city, where some soldiers were beaten or burned to death by angry workers. Lee Tze Chung, the president of the newspaper since 1951, was dismissed, and editor-in-chief Kam Yiu-yu went into exile in the United States. Following the dismissals, Wen Wei Po received financial support from the Chinese government to repair the image of China following the military crackdown in Beijing.

In 2016, Wen Wei Po merged with Ta Kung Pao to form the Hong Kong Dagong Wenhui Media Group, which is under the control of the Hong Kong Liaison Office.

In 2016, Dot Dot News was established in the same office as Wen Wei Po in Hing Wai Industrial Centre in Tin Wan.

== Content ==
=== Editorial position ===
Wen Wei Po has been described as pro-China and leftist.

According to The Challenge of Hong Kong's Reintegration With China, a book written by Ming K. Chan, Wen Wei Po is a "mouthpiece" of the Chinese government.

Despite their low credibility and dismal circulation in Hong Kong, these mouthpieces are well-financed by advertising revenues from the PRC companies...Wen Wei Po has received more funds...Both papers print many Xinhua-initiated commentaries under pseudonym aimed to criticize and intimidate China's critics.

=== Space and military news ===
Wen Wei Po is known to periodically leak first hand information about the PRC's space program and military buildup. Examples of this occurring include the advanced launch date of the Shenzhou 7 mission.

== See also ==
- Media of Hong Kong
- Ta Kung Pao
- Wenhui-Xinmin United Press Group
  - Shanghai Xinmin Evening News
