= GSK China scandal =

Bribing scandal involving the Chinese branch of drugmaker company GlaxoSmithKline

The GSK China scandal in 2013 resulted from bribes made by GSK China, a division of multinational pharmaceutical company GlaxoSmithKline (GSK), to Chinese doctors to increase sales. Chinese regulators received anonymous tips on GSK China's illegal activities as early as December 2011, with GSK China being fined. The GSK board received an email from anonymous whistleblowers in January 2013 notifying them of GSK China's activities, but the allegations were dismissed as a "smear campaign".

In March 2013, senior GSK executives received an email accusing GSK China of bribery; the email was accompanied by a sex tape featuring Mark Reilly, the head of GSK China. An internal investigation reported that it had found no evidence to support the allegations. GSK China hired Peter Humphrey to investigate the source of the sex tape; the investigation identified Vivian Shi, a former senior GSK China employee. Humphrey and his wife were arrested and imprisoned for violating Chinese privacy laws; according to Humphrey, he was tortured and mistreated for refusing to make a forced confession.

Chinese police recovered evidence of GSK China's bribery network in mid-2013. In September 2014, Reilly and three other Chinese executives were convicted and GSK was fined CN¥3 billion, the largest imposed by a Chinese court at the time. Reilly received a suspended sentence and was deported. The UK Serious Fraud Office investigation ended in 2019 after determining there was insufficient evidence to pursue further legal action.

== Background ==
=== Chinese market reforms ===
In 1978, China adopted reform and opening up and began attracting foreign businesses. According to Jerome A. Cohen, there was a longstanding policy of treating foreign enterprises leniently to avoid embarrassment and reduce the perception of widespread corruption within China; the policy has since evolved. According to lawyer Leon Liu, by 2014 China aimed to reform the healthcare sector and the pharmaceutical industry to control costs; this complemented the general anti-corruption drive. Inadequate funding and pay are a perverse incentives for healthcare providers to accept bribes. Growing economic nationalism and state assertiveness put multinational enterprises operating in China under greater scrutiny. GSK bribes continued even as the Chinese market became less permissive to such practices.

=== GSK policies ===
In the mid-2012, GSK was fined US$3 billion in the United States for misbranding drugs and failing to report drug safety data. Afterwards, GSK entered a five-year agreement with the United States Department of Health and Human Services to reform its compensation policy which tied bonuses to sales targets and providing perverse incentives for misconduct. The company promised to implement a new policy by 2015, which would include financial penalties for existing and former employees found to have engaged in major misconduct. Implementation of the new policy did not begin at GSK China until after the scandal.

GSK corporate governance was ineffective. The head office failed to detect the misconduct in GSK China leading to the scandal, with involved executives circumventing corporate controls. According to The New York Times, an internal November 2011 audit showed serious problems in GSK China facilities. In 2012, 56 of 312 employees dismissed for misconduct were from China.

== Whistleblower actions ==
=== Early warnings ===
Between December 2011 and April 2012, Chinese regulators received 24 anonymous tips originating from within GSK China about the company's operations. The tips described instances of fraud, corruption, and illicit practices including improper marketing techniques and kickbacks to healthcare professionals. The company learned of the tips in April 2012. Vivian Shi (Chinese: 施文; pinyin: Shī Wén), GSK China's head of government affairs, was suspected of being the whistleblower; she was fired in December 2012 against company policy protecting whistleblowers for allegedly falsifying travel expenses. Whistleblower emails were also sent to GSK and PricewaterhouseCoopers (GSK's auditors). GSK denied wrongdoing.

In January 2013, senior GSK executives received a detailed, 5200-word email in English accusing GSK China of systemic misconduct. Allegations included covering the full expenses, including recreation, of Chinese medical professionals ostensibly attending international conferences and falsifying financial records to hide marketing drugs for inappropriate uses. In one case, Lamictal, approved in China for treating epilepsy, was aggressively marketed for bipolar disorder; GSK China paid $9000 in hush money to a patient who was almost killed. The allegations were dismissed as a smear campaign.

In early 2013, GSK China established a unit to deal with the continuing whistleblower tips and regulator queries. It bribed regulators to investigate the misconduct as "unequal competition", a lesser offense to "commercial bribery", and limit the potential fine to $50,000.

=== Sex tape ===
In March 2013, GSK head office executives - including Andrew Witty, the chief executive officer - received an email from "gskwhistleblower" alleging that Mark Reilly, head of GSK China, was using travel agency China Comfort Travel to funnel money to doctors; in return the agency supplied Reilly with women for sex. The email also contained a clandestinely filmed video showing Reilly and his girlfriend having sex at his Shanghai apartment. Reilly moved to a more secure residence after the break-in and email.

In April 2013, GSK hired ChinaWhys, a small risk consultancy firm also serving Dell and Dow Chemical, to investigate the whistleblower and the break-in of Reilly's residence. ChinaWhys was led by Peter Humphrey and his wife, Yu Yingzeng. The investigation was called "Project Scorpion." Reilly told Humphrey that the company suspected Shi and to investigate her influence and connections to the Chinese state. According to law professor John Coates, the corporate-sponsored investigation "smack[ed] of retaliation". Humphrey's investigation Shi's personal life included illegally acquiring, but commonly sold, confidential documents. Project Scorpion may have drawn additional state scrutiny onto GSK. Humphrey's report to GSK in early June identified Shi as the likely whistleblower, but provided no evidence linking her to the emails or the video.

In early July, a week before the arrests of GSK executives by Chinese police, a four-month internal GSK investigation reported that there was "no evidence of corruption or bribery in our China business."

== Police investigations ==
=== Early evidence ===
The Chinese police denied that it was because of the internal conflicts and tips from inside the company that they launched the investigation.

According to Xinhua, a state run media outlet, and the police report, the Chinese investigations started with an investigation into an unknown Shanghai travel agency in early 2013. According to Shanghai-based media the Economic Observer, the travel agency, namely Shanghai Linjiang International Travel Agency Co., Ltd. (Chinese: 上海临江国际旅行社有限公司), was founded 7 years ago before the investigation, by a Shanghai real estate developer and a major Chinese footballer. The Chinese police said that the travel agency had few products but its revenue rose from million to hundreds of millions RMB. An investigation into the travel agency with help from other government offices identified its links to GSK and other pharmaceutical companies.

=== Police action ===
The Public Security Ministry assigned Changsha Police to form a task force to investigate into the lead. The task force gathered evidence for GSK's bribery in ten plus Chinese provinces including Beijing, Shanghai, Liaoning, Xinjiang in a year-long period. Shanghai and Zhengzhou Police were also assigned to make the investigation into the suspected economic crimes.

On 27 June and 10 July 2013, the Changsha Police, with the help from Shanghai and Zhengzhou Police, carried out raids in multiple GSK offices and related travel agencies in Beijing, Shanghai, and Nanjing, acquiring files and laptops and interrogating employees. 4 executives were arrested in Shanghai, including Mike Reilly, the company's China head and protagonist of the sex tape. A total of 14 were arrested. The Changsha Police announced the operation in a short statement on Weibo on 28 June. Besides, AstraZeneca, UCB and other pharmaceutical companies' employees were also questioned by the State Administration for Industry and Commerce and the police.

=== GSK response ===
Mike Reilly left China on 27 June when police took action at GSK China, which was not stopped by the police. In a police press, head of China's fraud unit Gao Feng said GSK was the boss in the bribery networks. Gao continued, "This is a very serious violation and a high-profile case. We are wondering why we have not received any information. As for the chief of the China business, you had better ask him yourself why he has left China and is not willing to return so far." But he also said he was willing to cooperate with overseas partners. GSK responded that it would closely cooperate with the Chinese authorities. Later, Reilly voluntarily returned to China to help the police with the investigations.

== Chinese media coverage ==
=== Bribery to doctors ===
The patent of GSK's leading hepatitis drug, Heptodin, expired in 2006. To cope with this, the company launched Changcheng (Chinese: 长城计划; lit. 'Great Wall Project') and Longteng (Chinese: 龙腾计划; lit. 'Dragon Flying Project') where the company used bribery to disincentivise Chinese doctors from using a Chinese equivalent of Heptodin.

According to Gao Feng, head of the economic crimes investigation unit at China's Public Security Ministry, GSK transferred 3 billion yuan to over 700 travel agencies and consultancies during a 6-year period, through which the company bribed doctors, hospitals, officials and medical associations. GSK bought services from the travel agencies at prices much higher than real prices, so that the agencies were able to serve as a fund for bribery which was independent of internal financial regulations of the company.

Xinhua described the hierarchy of GSK's bribery networks, where the company reps bribed ordinary doctors, area managers bribed major clients, regional manager bribed VIPs, the marketing department bribed academics, and the VIP department bribed institutes. To avoid regulation, the company paid 7 smaller drug companies including Jiangsu Tailing (Chinese: 江苏泰陵医药) to sell its products. The company bought cars, cameras, televisions, electrical autos and other non-medical equipment to bribed centers of disease control and vaccine injection centers for ¥13m.

=== Distorted drug prices ===
GSK's Lamivudine was priced at 142 RMB in mainland China, while it only cost 18RMB, 26RMB, 30RMB to buy the drug in Korea, Canada and Britain respectively. Adefovir Dipivoxil, another product of GSK, was as expensive as 182 RMB, but it only costs 103.5RMB and 59.92RMB to buy them in Japan and Hong Kong. The police investigation also showed how GSK manipulated their drug prices in China, which took 5 measures:

1. The company would first do market research in China. If there were similar drugs in China, they would make the prices of the drugs as a reference, or else, the company could price the drug "as high as it wanted."
2. GSK China then reported the prices to the financial sector of GSK.
3. GSK then sent the prices in China to GSK's transfer pricing (TP) center to calculate the importing prices and cost prices.
4. When the prices were approved by the TP center, GSK China would import the drugs at the calculated importing prices.
5. GSK China then would apply for approval from China's Development and Reform Commission for a new price based on the calculated importing price.

Chen Hongbo (Chinese: 陈洪波), former manager of GSK China, said to Xinhua that transfer pricing was a common strategy of multinationals, where a product was first sold to a middle country at a high price, and then it was imported to the destination at an even higher price based on the sale price in the middle country. Another way was to import raw materials for drugs. For example, Zinacef's raw material was packed in Cyprus and then was imported to Italy at a transferred price. After bottled in Italy, the bottled drug was imported to China at a much higher price. After it was labelled in China, the price would be even higher. The police told media that during 2009–12, GSK China's revenues of main business were ¥397.8m, ¥486.2m, ¥552.9m, ¥697.5m, but profits were merely ¥11m, ¥-4.7m, ¥6.0m, ¥-18.8m, which was owing to the company's transfer pricing strategy. Another manager of the company Liang Hong (Chinese: 梁宏) said that this helped the company avoid taxation in China.

GSK used bribery to stimulate the sales of extravagantly expensive drugs. A GSK rep told Xinhua that her boss said to her, "if the doctor wants money, then give them money; if the doctor wants academic achievements, then provides them with the opportunity." Liang Hong estimated that 30% of the drug prices were used in bribery in GSK China's sales. Although the compliance department and Internal Audit Department of GSK China showed evidence to the company that the company was faking invoices and fabricating records and books, the warnings were not taken seriously. Lan Shengke (Chinese: 兰省科), an executive of GSK China, said that Mike Reilly even fired a director at the compliance department as the strict enforcement of the compliance rules affected sales performance in 2011.

== Court ruling ==
The trial on the company's commercial bribery was held in the Chinese city of Changsha on 19 September 2014. According to Xinhua, the trial at Changsha Intermediate People's Court was not public as requested by GSK who wanted to keep business secrets. Mike Reilly was sentenced to 3-year jail sentences with 4-year suspension and deportation from China. Other three Chinese GSK employees were sentenced to 2 to 4 years. The company was sentenced to a record 3 billion yuan fine.

The fine was the largest corporate fine in China, but GSK did not defend its actions. In a statement after the trial, the company said it "apologizes to the Chinese patients, doctors and hospitals, and to the Chinese government and the Chinese people." The company said it had learnt from the mistakes and would do "tangible actions to establish itself as a model for reform in China's healthcare industry." The company also promised to continue to invest in China and would change its incentive program fundamentally. A source told China Business Networks that the sales group for hepatitis drugs, which was related to the company's bribery plans, was downsized after the scandal.

== Impact ==
=== Sales strategies of GSK ===
Although the China market only contributed to a small fraction of overall revenue of GSK, it is the fastest-growing markets of the company. The company had heavily invested in the market, where it built both clinical and research facilities. GSK's sales in China recorded a 25% drop in the second quarter of 2014. Globally, the quarterly profits fell by 14% to £1.3bn, which was below analysts' forecasts, leading to a 5% fall in its shares price, the biggest single fall on FTSE 100. The company still faced investigation by UK's Serious Fraud Office and US department of justice, due to the laws against overseas corruption in the two countries where GSK was listed.

The legal suits in China forced the company to make a statement in December 2013, where changes in incentive programs, including cancelling individual sales targets and related bonus, were put forwards and expected to be enforced since 2014. To educate doctors about its products "transparently and without any perception of conflict of interest," the company also aimed to stop direct payment to any attendees at medical conferences by 2016, which was considered a significant move by the British Medical Association.

Following the scandal, GSK promised to lower the prices of its products in China, which was regarded as a signal to other drugmakers in China. National Development and Reform Commission said it would examine the drug prices by 60 firms, after it had succeeded in making some foreign infant formula producers to lower the price in an earlier price-related inquiry. But the low prices was predicted not to last long without a systematic change to China's healthcare system. Many Chinese doctors said they had no choice but to use these foreign drugs, when Chinese patients had little trust in the quality of the Chinese equivalents.

=== Foreign firms in China's anti-corruption campaign ===
For a long time, corruption had been usually considered as part of the cost of doing business in China, and the medical industry was no exception. GSK's case occurred during the backdrop of Xi Jinping's anti-corruption campaign, which was believed to be focused on eliminating political opponents rather than stamping out corruption. Ben Cavender, an associate principal at China Market Research Group, said that the GSK's case could be part of the greater trend of fighting against corruption, where foreign firms were advised to carefully obey the law. However, the American Chamber of Commerce in China and US-China Business Council published reports, saying that foreign companies in China felt increasingly targeted by Chinese regulators. The president of the US-China Business Council doubted whether China was using such kinds of probes to protect its domestic industry.

The anti-corruption effort backfired at the communication between international pharmaceutical firms and Chinese academics and local firms. A senior research director in Shanghai admitted money-involving new cooperation between international pharmaceutical firms and Chinese academics and hospitals were suspended in 2013. Pharmaceutical companies usually invested in continuing medical education (CME) where the latest medical progress was discussed in order to encourage doctors to use their products. While CME was strictly regulated in Europe and the US, there was little oversight in emerging markets such as China. In China, foreign pharmas were usually the ones who paid for the educational programs that few Chinese companies paid.

== Aftermath ==
=== Humphrey's privacy breach ===
According to lawyers via the Financial Times, China's privacy law had become from one of the loosest one to a tighter one. In 2009, the country amended the criminal law to prohibit illegal transfer or trade of personal data and punish anyone who wants to buy or sell them. Violation of the law can lead to up to 3 years in jail.

On 10 July, which was 2 weeks after the police operations at GSK offices, Shanghai police arrested Humphrey and his wife Yu at their Shanghai apartment, charging them with privacy law breach. Harvard Humphrey, the son of Peter Humphrey accused of GSK of engaging his father "under false pretenses", and described his father as "an honorable and law-abiding man". Humphrey and his wife Yu said that they accepted the offer as they believed that the bribery allegations were false and that they were investigating a smear campaign. Humphrey said on Chinese national television that it was not his intention to break any Chinese law. He refused to confess to the charges levelled against him.

Humphrey and Yu were found to have acquired 256 items of personal information. Humphrey was sentenced to 2 and a half and Yu was sentenced to 2 years by the Shanghai First Intermediate People's Court, which was a much more severe sentence compared to other cases of similar conditions in Shanghai. After being denied care and tortured, Humphrey was released 7 months early and his wife Yu was released about the same time. They left China and went to the UK on 16 June 2015.

=== Illegal dismissal ===
In the dismissal announced on 6 March 2015, 3 pregnant women and 4 nursing mothers were laid off. According to a former employee, the company talked to them individually, claiming that the employees had misbehavior and it had evidence for that. The company asked the employees to submit a resignation report by 9 March, and the company would consider it as a voluntary resignation. The employees were threatened by the company as it would leave a black mark in their employees' documents if the employees refused to comply with the requests. The laid-off employees' access to their office and emails were cut right on the day of the talk.

GSK China identified and terminated more than 110 employees which it had "dismissed as a result of a crackdown on illegal expenses" during the period preceding the scandal. The laid-off employees rallied before the GSK's Shanghai headquarter to protests against the dismissal. Approximately half of the terminated workers appealed their dismissal, and GSK's refusal to reimburse employees for expenses incurred before termination, before a labour dispute arbitration committee.

=== Vivian Shi and the whistleblower ===
According to the New York Times, the whistleblower could be more than one person, as the emails to regulators were written in fluent English via a Gmail account while the emails with a sex tape were written in poor English thorough a Chinese email service. One of the email addresses responded to the New York Times, which denied Vivian Shi as a whistleblower. The response added,

I didn't reveal to GSK personnel that I was the whistle-blower because doing so would have placed me in potential physical jeopardy. You understand that criminals — you know that they were convicted later in Chinese courts — were in charge of GSK China at that time, and I truly believe that they would have harmed me in some fashion had they discovered my identity.

The company denied that it was trying to dig out the whistleblower and instead the company was trying to fix a security hole for its employees. In 2015, Shi rejoined the company that fired her three years ago. GSK confirmed the information but refused to make further comment. Friends of Humphrey/Yu couple believed Shi was a key figure in the couple's detention and the couple's investigations into Shi's political relations resulted in them being sent to jail.

=== Investigations by other governments ===
==== UK Serious Fraud Office ====
UK's Serious Fraud Office initiated an investigation in 2014, but the cased was closed by its new director Lisa Osofsky in 2019, after costing £7.5 million in the investigation. The Office's director said,

"After an extensive and careful examination, I have concluded that there is either insufficient evidence to provide a realistic prospect of conviction or it is not in the public interest to bring a prosecution in these cases."

==== US Securities and Exchange Commission ====
As GSK bribery in China was a breach of US's Foreign Corrupt Practices Act during 2010–13, the Securities and Exchange Commission launched an investigation into the company. In September 2016, GSK agreed to pay a civil penalty of $20 million to settle the case, but it did not admit or deny the allegations.
