= The Paper (newspaper) =

Chinese Communist Party newspaper

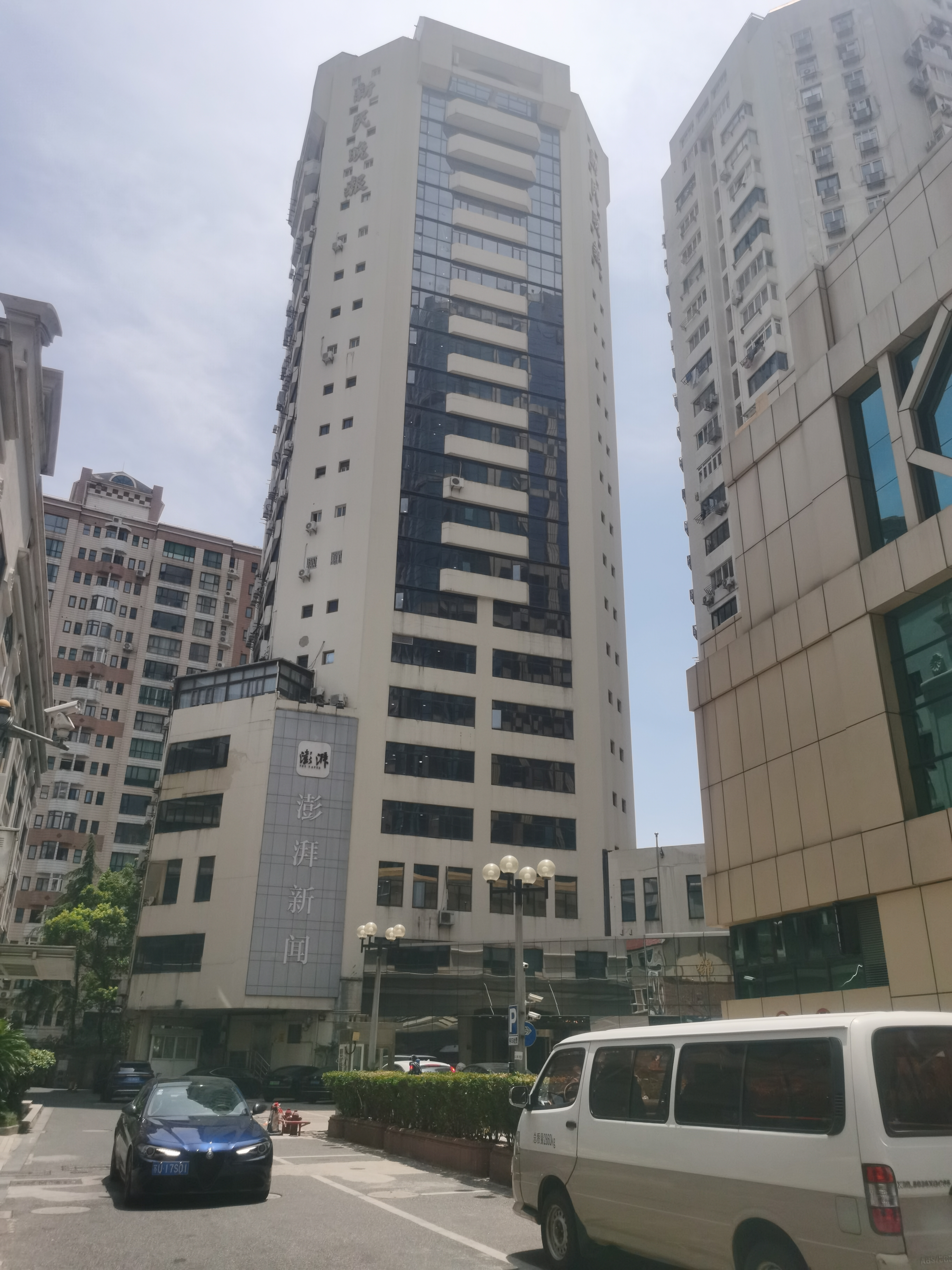
- The Paper headquarters
- Type: Daily newspaper
- Format: Online newspaper
- Publisher: Shanghai United Media Group
- Founded: July 2014; 12 years ago
- Political alignment: Chinese Communist Party
- Language: Mandarin Chinese
- Headquarters: 839 Yan'an West Road, Jing'an District, Shanghai
- Sister newspapers: Sixth Tone
- Website: www.thepaper.cn

The Paper
- Simplified Chinese: 澎湃新闻
- Traditional Chinese: 澎湃新聞
Transcriptions
Standard Mandarin
- Hanyu Pinyin: Péngpài Xīnwén

The Paper (Chinese: 澎湃新闻; lit. 'Surging News') is a Chinese digital newspaper owned and run by the state-owned Shanghai United Media Group.

== History ==
The Paper was launched in July 2014 as an offshoot of the Shanghai United Media Group publication Oriental Morning Post. It received a large amount of initial funding, speculated to be anywhere from US$16 million to 64 million. Of this, RMB 100 million (approximately $14,500,000) was provided by the government through the Cyberspace Administration of China.

The Paper was founded as an attempt to capture the readership of mobile internet users as revenue from mainstream physical papers across China saw major declines in the early 2010s.

In May 2016, The Paper launched Sixth Tone, an English-language sister publication. On 28 December 2016, six completely state-owned or invested firms in Shanghai executed a strategic equity investment in Shanghai Oriental Newspaper Industry Company Limited, the operator of The Paper, amounting to a total capital increase of 610 million yuan. Following the capital increase, Shanghai United Media Group's ownership stake in Oriental Newspaper Company decreased from 100% to 82.2%, however it retains ultimate control over the company. Simultaneously, the Shanghai United Media Group resolved that as of 1 January 2017, the Oriental Morning Post discontinued publication, with all original news reporting and opinion guidance functions being transferred to The Paper.

In February 2025, The Paper significantly reduced its workforce, consolidating 13 editing centers into six, and terminating 20 portions of its news service along with 15 social media profiles.

== Reporting ==
The Paper was originally given greater leeway in its reporting than other comparable organizations in China, where the government heavily censors and controls media. In allowing relative autonomy, the government aims to foster a media organization popular with younger online users that will still follow the political line of the Chinese Communist Party.

The Paper has focused on investigative reporting. The day of its founding, it published a piece on judicial misconduct in Anhui province, prompting the Anhui High People's Court to reopen an investigation into a case. It has since become known for similar stories on societal scandals and corruption, including a series on Ling Jihua.

Certain reports garnered the attention of leaders; for instance, in November 2017, Premier Li Keqiang addressed The Paper news regarding "children with leukemia facing a shortage of affordable domestic medications, with imported drugs exceeding 1,000 yuan per bottle," issuing directives for relevant departments to "effectively enhance the production and supply of inexpensive domestic drugs to ensure availability."
