= Qingpu Prison =

Prison in Qingpu District, Shanghai, China

Shanghai Municipal Qingpu Prison
- Location within Shanghai Location within China
- Location: 7405 Wai Qingsong Road, Qingpu District, Shanghai; 31.12160°N 121.13397°E
- Capacity: 5,000-6,000
- Opened: 24 December 1994
- Managed by: Shanghai Municipal Prison Administration
- Warden: Li Qiang

Shanghai Municipal Qingpu Prison
- Traditional Chinese: 上海市青浦監獄
- Simplified Chinese: 上海市青浦监狱
Transcriptions
Standard Mandarin
- Hanyu Pinyin: Shànghǎi Shì Qīngpǔ Jiānyù

Shanghai Municipal Qingpu Prison (Chinese: 上海市青浦监狱) is in Qingpu District on the outskirts of Shanghai, China. Supervised under Shanghai Municipal Prison Administration (Chinese: 上海市监狱管理局), the 300-mu prison officially opened on 24 December 1994, guarded by 300 police officers.

CNN described it as Shanghai's main facility for non-Chinese prisoners.

== Operation ==
The prison is supervised under Shanghai Prison Administration, which says that the prison has 4 task forces including security, office, education, labor. The prison is said to have 15 offices with different functions covering comprehensive issues, professional issues, cooperative issues, and maintenance issues.

Principally, Qingpu Prison is used to detain those who are sentenced to more than 7 years. It is also an appointed prison in Shanghai to hold foreign male criminals and has detainees from around 40 countries. According to Shanghai Prison Administration, Qingpu Prison has 9 units. Among the units, three functional units include logistic unit, foreign prisoners unit and full alert unit. Commutation-restricted or highly dangerous criminals are held in full alert unit. Foreign prisoners are held in the foreign prisoners unit, which were said to be Brigade No. 8, according to former detainees.

According to the prison, the prisoners need to work for 5 days, study for 1 day and rest for 1 day each week. Shanghai Open University provides degree education for the prisoners. Vocational education is also provided, which includes education of jade sculpture, embroidery, bamboo sculpture in Shanghai local culture. Some released prisoners are said to become a national or citywide experts in such skills.

=== Media coverage ===
When interviewed by state-owned television CCTV/CGTN in 2019, Li Qiang, Warden of Qingpu Prison, said that the labor in the prison was elective, and was paid by the prison. He added that when the prisoners are released, they could withdraw the payment from the prison after paying a forfeit.

According to Shanghai local media Xinmin Weekly in 2019, Qingpu prison has held activities including art festival, food festival, stage drama, etc. Previous coverage by Xinimn in 2006 said that the prison treated Chinese and foreign prisoners differently. For example, foreign prisoners were not required to made the bed as tidy as the Chinese prisoners They were also provided education programs including Chinese language, Chinese geography and Chinese history.

Another Shanghai local media eastday.com made a report in 2018 about how jade curving in Brigade No. 6 positively changed a criminal and made him a peaceful and intellectual person. In the report, Liu Gang, Deputy Warden of Brigade No. 6, told the reporter that no one among over 100 prisoners released from the brigade in the last 20 years committed a crime again and 80% of these prisoners became a jade sculptor after released.

Yet, according to an autobiographic story by former prisoner Peter Humphrey in the Sunday Times, life in Qingpu Prison was a misery, where 12 prisoners were held in a cell, prisoners slept on rusted iron bunks covered with only 1-cm-thick mattress, there was no heating or air conditioner in the cell, making summer extremely hot and winter bitterly cold and prisoners had to get up during 5:30 - 6:00 AM and had to go to bed at around 21:30 PM. The ceiling lights were never turned off and the barred windows were always open. He described the prison as a "a business, doing manufacturing jobs for companies" using forced prison labour.

== Allegations of forced labor ==
Peter Humphrey, a British private investigator, spent nine months at Qingpu Prison during a 23-month incarceration in China. He was put to jail due to his "illegal acquisition of personal information" according to Shanghai No.1 Intermediate Court's sentence after arrested during an investigation into a high-rank employee's bribery in China paid by GlaxoSmithKline headquarter. Before Peter Humphrey and his wife finished the investigation, the Chinese police arrested them due to the company's bribery across China. Humphrey was released in 2015.

Qingpu Prison made global headlines in December 2019 after a London family discovered a plea for help written in a Christmas card purchased from British supermarket chain Tesco. The message claimed to be written by inmates of Qingpu Prison "forced to work against our will", and implored the reader to contact human rights organisations as well as former inmate Peter Humphrey. The cards were produced by Zhejiang Yunguang Printing, located roughly 100 kilometres from the prison. Humphrey said he believed the message was written by his former cellmates.

Other former prisoners have since confirmed forced labor and torture at this facility.

A couple of days after the message was discovered, China's Foreign Ministry spokesmen Geng Shuang denied forced labour accusations, saying: "I can responsibly say, according to the relevant organs, Qingpu prison does not have this issue of foreign prisoners being forced to work." Tesco has since suspended the Chinese supplier of Christmas cards and has launched its own investigation.

Chen Yunbiao, General Manager of Zhejiang Yunguang Printing, said to state-owned television CCTV, "On hearing the news, I was very shocked, because we had never done that. Not only do I have no contact with Qingpu Prison, but I don't know where the prison is. It is completely fabricated and is a libel. We never had any business relationship with Qingpu Prison." He added that according to the contract, their foreign customers could even examine their computers to ensure their transparency and had random check on employee rights.

A former inmate from Lithuania has come forward and confirmed allegations of forced labor and mistreatment as well as a coverup following the Christmas card being discovered in the UK.

== Notable prisoners ==
- Jude Shao - American entrepreneur.
- Stern Hu - Australian businessman.
- Peter William Humphrey – British private investigator
- James Peng Jiandong – Australian businessman abducted in 1993 from Macau, then a Portuguese territory, by the Chinese government

== See also ==
- List of prisons in Shanghai
- Tilanqiao Prison
