= Wenhui Book Review =

Chinese newspaper

Wenhui Book Review (simplified Chinese: 文汇读书周报; traditional Chinese: 文匯讀書周報; pinyin: Wénhuì Dúshū Zhōubào) is a state-owned weekly newspaper based in Shanghai, owned by Shanghai United Media Group. It was established on March 2, 1985.
