= Tilanqiao Prison =

Prison in Shanghai, China

Coordinates: 31°15′20″N 121°30′37″E

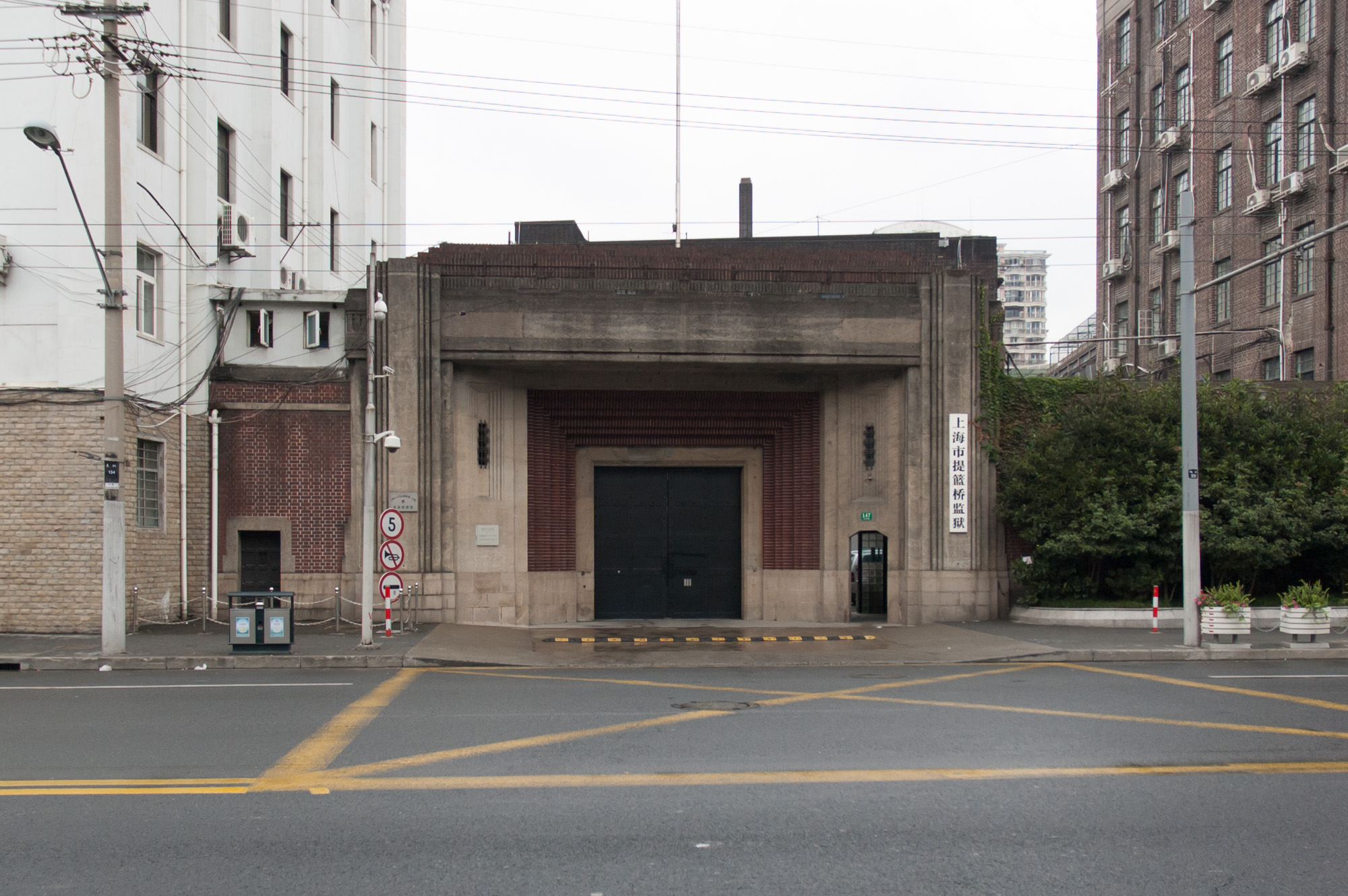
- Tilanqiao Prison
- Simplified Chinese: 提篮桥监狱
- Traditional Chinese: 提籃橋監獄
Transcriptions
Standard Mandarin
- Hanyu Pinyin: Tílánqiáo Jiānyù

The Tilanqiao Prison (Chinese: 提篮桥监狱), formerly known as the Ward Road Gaol or Shanghai Municipal Gaol, is a prison located in Qingpu, Shanghai. It was originally built in the foreign-controlled Shanghai International Settlement. It was then controlled by the occupying Japanese force during the Second World War and the Chinese Nationalist Government after its end. Following the Chinese Communist Revolution in 1949, the People's Republic of China government assumed control of the prison, which has since been run by the Ministry of Public Security. Throughout the first forty or so years of its life it was the largest prison in the world and earned a reputation as the "Alcatraz of the Orient".

== Ward Road Gaol period (1903–1941) ==
Tilanqiao Prison was built to hold those convicted of crimes in Shanghai's International Settlement. Prior to its construction foreign convicts were held in ad hoc prisons within their consulates (or, if British, the Amoy Road Gaol) until they could be returned to their home country, and Chinese citizens were handed over to the native Chinese authorities. In 1901, however, with the growing size of the International Settlement and, in the aftermath of the Boxer Rebellion, a fear the Qing government could no longer control its citizens, the Shanghai Municipal Council drew up plans for a modern-style jail based on Singaporean and Canadian designs. Construction began at 117 Ward Road that year, with the first prisoners were placed in cells on 18 May 1903.

Originally comprising 450 cells across two four-storey blocks, the prison was expanded after the 1911 Xinhai Revolution, when the previously Chinese-run International Mixed Courts of the Settlement were abandoned by the Qing government and taken over by the Shanghai Municipal Council (SMC). Further extensions took place in 1916 and continued until 1935 when the prison reached a grand total of some 70,000 square metres (17 acres), including six prison blocks, a juvenile block, a hospital, an administration block, workshops, a kitchen and laundry, and an execution chamber, all surrounded by a five-metre-tall (16 ft) wall with guard-towers. The execution chamber is considered unique in pre-Second World War China in that it carried out death by hanging, with the body dropping through a trapdoor directly into the prison hospital's morgue. Over the years specialist rooms were added to the prison, including 'isolation rooms' with rubber wallpaper, and a secure command centre for regrouping in event of a riot.

The prison population comprised a mix of Chinese and European males found guilty by consular courts, though some European countries preferred not to send convicts to the Ward Road Gaol and instead transferred them to prisons in their home countries or their other colonies. Female Chinese convicts were only interned in the Ward Road Gaol between 1904 and 1906, after which they were sent to female prisons elsewhere in the province. European women were housed in a Foreign Women's Block, but this closed in 1922 and women were placed in the French Concession's prison. In 1925 a decision was made to no longer imprison Western convicts at Ward Road, instead sending them to the Settlement's Caucasian-only prison: Amoy Road Gaol.

Between 1925 and 1930, the Ward Road Gaol was a prison predominantly housing Chinese prisoners, controlled and run by predominantly British and Indian staff. In 1930 Chiang Kai-shek's Kuomintang government negotiated for all male prisoners, Western or Chinese, to be sent to Ward Road Gaol and for it to be run as close to Chinese guidelines as possible. This was agreed in theory, though the British staff were unwilling to enforce Chinese discipline as provided in the guidelines, as this was considered harsh – even by the prison's own rough standards.

For its existence, Ward Road Gaol has been considered one of the harshest in the world. Silence was enforced at all times and overcrowding was rife. In 1934 there were only 2925 cells between its 6000 inmates. Tuberculosis was found in nearly 65% of long-term prisoners, suicide was not uncommon, and discipline was enforced through physical punishment by use of long batons. The majority of warders were Indian Sikhs, who were generally despised by Chinese prisoners. Western prisoners were separated from the Chinese and were relatively better cared for, being given lighter duties, separate cells and softer uniforms. After 1930 they too were officially brought under the same discipline system as the Chinese, however.

== Wartime period (1932–1949) ==
=== 1932 to 1943 ===
After the First Battle of Shanghai ended with the de facto control of Hongkou, Ward Road Gaol found itself located in the middle of the Japanese-controlled sector of the International Settlement. Again, during the hostilities of 1937, the prison was trapped between the Chinese and Japanese armies. It was accidentally shelled a number of times, with prisoners killed and guards injured. A short cease-fire allowed 500 prisoners to be released to safe areas, but the Japanese cancelled further prisoner releases after the Municipal Council stated it could not simply turn loose young offenders into a dangerous environment.

The prison remained under the management and control of the Municipal Council until it was disbanded in 1943 and the prison continued to process and detain Chinese and foreign prisoners in Ward Road Gaol. However, after the commencement of the Pacific War in December 1941, Japan took over effective control of the council. The prison nonetheless retained many of its Sikh and European guards.

=== 1943 to 1945 ===
This changed when it was turned over to the Wang Jingwei Government in 1943 following the disbandment of the International Settlement. The prison was renamed Tilanqiao Prison after the surrounding district. For the rest of the war the prison was used to hold thousands of Chinese dissidents who dissented against the Nanjing government, Western prisoners of war, and some European civilians. Many prisoners were removed from the prison by the Japanese and used as forced labour.

In February 1944, a section of the prison was made a consular prison for the detention of Japanese under control of the Japanese Consulate General.

It was during this period that Ward Road saw its first and only escape, when two Americans and one British naval officer, all Allied POW's, managed to escape from the prison with Chinese assistance. In September 1944, USMC Corporal Jerold Beers Story, USN Lieutenant Commander Columbus Darwin Smith, and Commander John B. Wooley RN traveled 700 miles over seven weeks across Japanese-occupied China until they reached friendly forces.

=== 1945 to 1949 ===
In 1945 the Axis powers surrendered and Tilanqiao Prison was brought under the control of Chiang Kai-shek's Kuomintang government. The KMT used the prison to detain several hundred Japanese war criminals and a number of Chinese who had been part of Wang Jingwei's government. In 1947 the first trials of these criminals were held. 13 Chinese hanjian prisoners were executed inside the prison's walls. The U.S. military also used the prison to execute Japanese war criminals convicted by an American military commission in Shanghai.

In 1948, the underground Communist Party member Wang Xiaohe was executed by the Kuomintang after a show trial. The execution took place in the prison yard by firing squad rather than in the execution chamber.

== Modern period (1950–present) ==
With the victory of the Communists (PRC) in the Chinese Civil War in 1949, Shanghai's Tilanqiao Prison was brought under the control of the Municipal Military Control Commission and renamed the Shanghai People's Prison. In 1951 it was turned over to the civil Public Security Bureau and again renamed; this time to Shanghai Prison. It continued under this name until 1995 when it was named Shanghai Tilanqiao Prison.

For many years Tilanqiao Prison was one of China's largest and most (in)famous prisons, often held and reported as a model prison by the PRC state. Nevertheless, human rights groups and Western governments argue the prison continues to engage in torture, deprivation and cruelty. Allegations of torture and ill-treatment toward high-profile prisoners such as Mao Hengfeng have been used to highlight apparent abuses at the prison.

In 2024, the prison was relocated to a newly built complex in Qingpu District.

== See also ==
- Penal system in China
  - List of prisons in Shanghai
    - Qingpu Prison
- Shanghai International Settlement
- Shanghai Municipal Police
