= Jiemian News =

Chinese news website

- Type: Daily newspaper
- Format: Broadsheet
- Owner: Shanghai United Media Group
- Founded: September 2014; 11 years ago
- Language: Chinese
- Headquarters: Shanghai
- Country: People's Republic of China
- Website: en.jiemian.com

Jiemian News
- Traditional Chinese: 界面新聞
- Simplified Chinese: 界面新闻
Transcriptions
Standard Mandarin
- Hanyu Pinyin: Jièmiànxīnwén
- Wade–Giles: chieh mien hsin wen

Jiemian News (simplified Chinese: 界面新闻; traditional Chinese: 界面新聞; pinyin: Jièmiànxīnwén) is a state-owned financial and business news media outlet established by the Shanghai United Media Group in September 2014.

== History ==
Shanghai United Media Group launched the "Jiemian" website in collaboration with Xiaomi Technology, Qihoo 360, Haitong Securities, Guotai Junan Securities, Lenovo Hony, and Zall Media. Its slogan is "Only for those who think independently," and its target audience is the "emerging middle class in China."

On 25 January 2015, the Jiemian Alliance (JMedia), a self-media alliance, was founded in Beijing.

At the end of 2017, Jiemian News completed the acquisition of the entire Blue Whale Finance and Cailian Press through a stock swap.

== Content ==
The products or special sections of the Jiemian website include: Moore (finance), Wailou (global oddities), Noon (story writing), and Beautiful Things (online store).
