= Jude Shao =

American entrepreneur (born 1963)

Jude Shao (born 1963) is an American entrepreneur and the founder of American Energy Products LLC, the Houston-based manufacturer of Sky Blue butane fuel canisters. After becoming an American citizen in 1997, Shao was imprisoned in China's Qing Pu Prison on tax fraud charges from 1998 to 2008. He alleged that he was imprisoned after refusing to bribe a Chinese official to benefit his business, China Business Ventures.

== Biography ==
The Stanford Daily quoted Shao as saying “I had set up the company’s policy not to bribe any government officials in China. I am a Stanford MBA. I wasn’t interested in unethical business practice.”

Shao graduated from the Stanford Graduate School of Business with an MBA in 1993. He then founded China Business Ventures (CBV), a company that exported American medical equipment to China. By 1997, the CBV had offices in San Francisco and Shanghai.

In 1997, Shao, previously a U.S. permanent resident, became a naturalized U.S. citizen.

In spite of his new nationality, Shao was detained in Shanghai in April 1998 and held incommunicado for 26 months, a violation of the guarantees to consular access provided by the Vienna Convention on Consular Relations. Chinese tax auditors had begun investigating the company in 1997, later alleging that he had underpaid import and sales taxes totaling more than $300,000. Shao said that he had paid the taxes and has the accounting records to prove it. Evidence that would have exonerated him, said his friends, was never allowed in court, and Chinese officials stonewalled attempts to appeal. He was convicted in March 2000 and given a 16-year prison sentence.

Shao's case received a great deal of attention, partially due to the efforts of some of his fellow business school alumni, who initiated letter-writing campaigns and tried to raise public awareness. He was awarded parole on July 2, 2008, and ordered to serve his parole in Shanghai.

Shao returned to the United States in early May 2013 and immediately founded American Energy Products LLC, the manufacturer of Sky Blue Butane fuel canisters, with the help of a group of his Stanford Graduate School of Business classmates.

== See also ==
- List of Americans wrongfully imprisoned or detained abroad
