= KWRM =

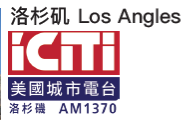
- Corona, California; United States
- Broadcast area: Greater Los Angeles
- Frequency: 1370 kHz
- Branding: iCiti Radio Los Angeles

Programming
- Language: Chinese
- Format: All-news radio

Ownership
- Owner: James Y. Su; (EDI Media, Inc.)

History
- First air date: 1948
- Former call signs: KREL (1948–1974)

Technical information
- Licensing authority: FCC
- Facility ID: 39692
- Class: B
- Power: 1,100 watts (day); 240 watts (night)
- Transmitter coordinates: 33°58′9.5″N 117°38′4.4″W

Links
- Public license information: Public file; LMS
- Webcast: Listen live
- Website: icitynews.com

KWRM (1370 AM, iCiti Radio Los Angeles) is a commercial radio station that broadcasts a Chinese language all-news format. It is owned by James Y. Su, through licensee EDI Media, Inc. The station is licensed to Corona, California, United States, with a transmitter located south of the Chino Airport.

== History ==
Most of KWRM's programming is in Mandarin Chinese. However, there are some English-language shows, especially sports events and talk shows. Some Spanish-language shows also are heard.

KWRM is the current flagship station of the Orange County Flyers of the Golden Baseball League. In the past, the station has carried the Rancho Cucamonga Quakes California League baseball and the baseball and basketball teams of Cal State Fullerton, Cal State Long Beach, and UC Irvine.

In the 1980s the station was co-owned by Pat Boone and played syndicated content, Big Band format along with locally produced talk shows such as "Call the Chief" hosted by the station manager Pat Michaels and produced by Randall Vorisek. Some of this content simultaneously aired on 95.1 FM KQLH which was KWRM's sister station. The Corona station had a small production studio that produced these and that also produced content solely for KQLH. Early 1980's broadcasters included station manager Pat Michaels, program director Marlon Pailey, John Drapo and Randall Vorisek who also engineered for the live Sunday broadcasts in Spanish.

This station became time-brokered in the mid-1990s.

In the mid-2000s, KWRM was often referred to as "The Worm" covering high-school football programs that featured future NCAA and NFL stars, as well as collegiate and professional baseball. The Worm also carried the USC Trojans college football for several seasons. In the Summer of 2005, KWRM began producing several sport talk shows, including the show "Controversy." Controversy was hosted by then Assistant Sports Director Roman Valdez, along with Aaron Toller and Jaeson Zinke. All three doubled as play-by-play announcers on KWRM-produced and broadcast games.

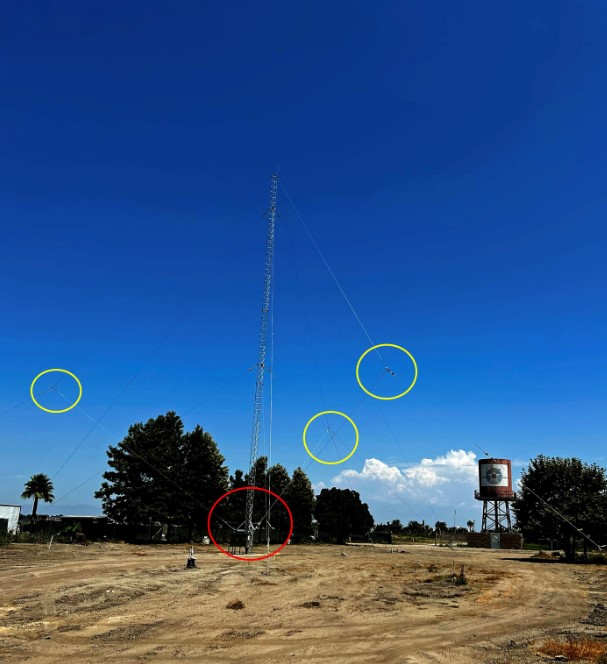
WKRM Tower

In April 2020 the station filed an STA with the FCC to go silent while it seeks a new transmitter tower location. Its long-time towers erected adjacent to the 91/15 freeways interchange had been removed. An FCC record dated April 14, 2020 said the station is "licensed and silent.". KWRM resumed broadcasting on October 6, 2024, from a new transmitter tower south of the Chino Airport.

In 2024, KWRM (1370 AM) began broadcasting from a new transmitter site in the Corona area of California. The station's new facility uses a 100-foot tower with an umbrella-skirt antenna design developed by Ben Dawson of Hatfield & Dawson and Bobby Cox of Kintronic Laboratories. The tower was designed with consideration for its proximity to Chino Airport. The station operates with a power of 1.1 kW during the daytime and 240 watts at night, serving the Los Angeles, San Bernardino, and Riverside metropolitan areas.

Three engineers working together to get things set on the air, left Ashley Wallen, chief project engineer, Steven Lockwood, President, Hatfield & Dawson; and Bob Burnham transmitter site construction engineer.

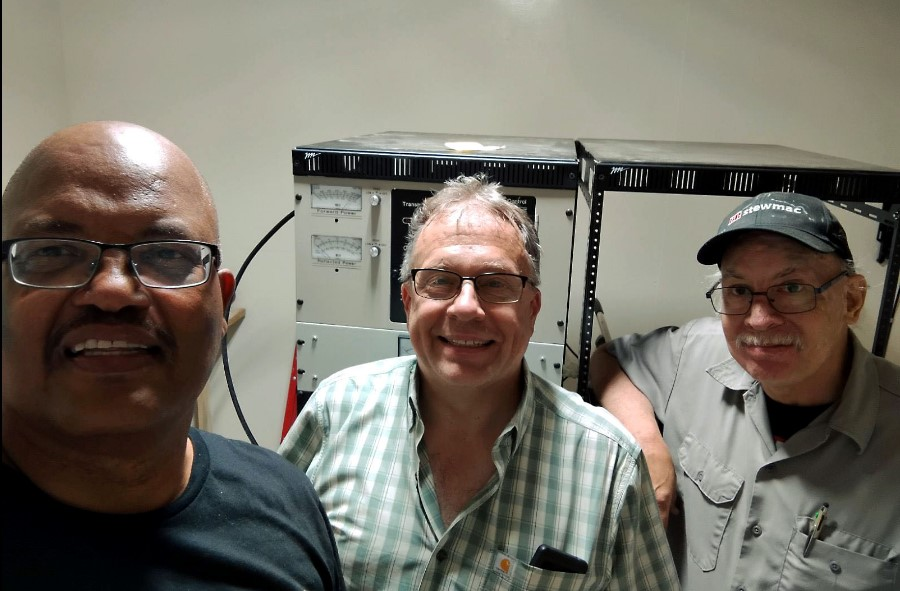
Engineering Team
