= EDI Media =

Chinese-American media company

EDI Media Inc.
- Native name: 鷹龍傳媒有限公司
- Founded: 1993; 33 years ago
- Headquarters: West Covina, California, United States
- Key people: James Su (founder and CEO)
- Industry: Mass media
- Website: edimediainc.org

EDI Media (Chinese: 鷹龍傳媒有限公司) is a Chinese-language media company based in West Covina, California, United States.

== History and management ==
EDI Media was founded in 1993 by James Su (Chinese: 苏彦韬), a naturalized American business mogul who was born in China. He is currently the company's CEO.

=== Links to Chinese state media ===
Su has a long history of working with Chinese state media and has received awards from the Chinese government for his media activities. Another of Su's companies, G&E Studio (which shared an office building with EDI Media) was investigated by the Federal Communications Commission (FCC) in 2015 for being 60% owned by Chinese state-run broadcaster China Radio International.

In May 2022, EDI Media was obligated to register as a foreign agent under the Foreign Agents Registration Act due to publishing the American version of Xinmin Evening News, a state-owned newspaper designated by the United States as a foreign mission of the Chinese government.

=== 2026 FBI probe ===
In July 2026, EDI Media offices were searched by the Federal Bureau of Investigation as part of a probe into foreign influence.

== Stations and projects ==
According to its website, EDI Media operates the following:

- iCiTi TV
- iCiTi News
- iCiTi Magazine
- iCiTi Radio KWRM AM1370
- KCFJ 570AM (an ABC Audio affiliate)
- KCNO 94.5 FM

EDI Media also produces the Chinese American Film Festival, which it launched in 2005 with the support of China's State Administration of Radio, Film and Television.

== Content ==
According to the Los Angeles Times, "EDI describes itself as the largest Chinese American multimedia company in the U.S. and says it is designed to further U.S.-China relations." It produces content in both Chinese and English. According to company figures as of 2026, it broadcasts more than 2,000 hours of content annually and reaches over 35 million people.

In 2015, EDI Media's website stated it was "China's outward media and advertising proxy". The Hoover Institution in 2018 described its content about China as "[mirroring] that of China's state-owned media".

== See also ==
- United front (China)
- Chinese espionage in California
