= Shanghai Daily =

English-language daily newspaper in China

- Type: Daily newspaper
- Owner: Shanghai United Media Group
- Founded: 1999; 27 years ago
- Political alignment: Chinese Communist Party
- OCLC number: 225360915
- Website: www.citynewsservice.cn/shanghaidaily

Shanghai Daily (Chinese: 上海日报; pinyin: Shànghǎi Rìbào) is an English-language newspaper founded in 1999 and owned by the Shanghai United Media Group, a state media company under the control of the Shanghai Municipal Committee of the Chinese Communist Party. It was the first daily newspaper in English in Shanghai.

== History ==
In 2012, Shanghai Daily launched its iDealShanghai brand, aiming to offer its readers lifestyle information in Shanghai and neighboring cities.

On August 1, 2017, Shanghai Daily rebranded itself online as SHINE.

== See also ==
- List of newspapers in China
- Mass media in China
