= Sixth Tone =

State-owned English-language online magazine in China

- Editor-in-chief: Ting Wu
- Publisher: Shanghai United Media Group
- Founded: 2016
- Based in: Shanghai, China
- Language: English
- Website: www.sixthtone.com

Sixth Tone (Chinese: 第六声; pinyin: Dì liù shēng) is a Chinese state-owned English-language online magazine published by Shanghai United Media Group.

== Name ==
Sixth Tone's name relates to the number of tones in Mandarin Chinese, but also is stated to carry more metaphorical meaning as well. Mandarin Chinese has four active tones and a fifth dropped tone that has less prominence than the other four. Because of the language's five tones, the publication's name refers to an ideal of expanding beyond traditionally-reported items in Anglophone media, making it the "sixth tone".

== History ==
The online magazine began publication on April 6, 2016, with an investment of US$4.5 million from the Shanghai United Media Group. It is a sister publication of The Paper. Wei Xing was its first editor-in-chief until May 30, 2016, when he left the magazine to launch a start-up. His successor, Zhang Jun, became the new editor-in-chief that year.

By 2018, Western media began to cite Sixth Tone in news reports. Vincent Ni, in an essay published in Westminster Papers in Communication and Culture, stated that, "For foreign journalists, it has also shown a diverse and authentic side of China that rarely received much attention elsewhere" and that the publication "has proved far more effective than the hundreds of millions of dollars invested in English-language news programs by the state broadcaster Xinhua, CCTV, and CRI."

In 2022, following the sudden lifting of China's prolonged zero-COVID measures, Sixth Tone published a year-in-review feature highlighting key terms like "baby bust," "housing crisis," "gender violence," and "COVID". This feature, deemed as being critical to the country's COVID policy, faced criticism from China nationalists who accused the outlet of having an editorial bias akin to Western media, citing its frequent reception of international awards from The Society of Publishers in Asia (SOPA) as proof. In response, Shanghai authorities requested senior editors to engage in self-reflection. Consequently, the outlet stopped submitting entries for international awards like SOPA due to fear of repercussions.

In 2023, the publication had new management installed following repeated attacks by nationalists on Weibo.

== Reception ==
Bethany Allen-Ebrahimian, writing for Foreign Policy, stated that Sixth Tone has a less staid and "saccharine" tone compared to many other English-language publications from China. She stated, "If webby U.S. media startup Vox were acquired by the Chinese Communist Party, it might resemble Sixth Tone".

In a 2016 interview with The New York Times, the then-editor-in-chief, Wei Xing, sought to differentiate his magazine from other Chinese English-language publications. Wei stated that compared to other government-owned news publications, Sixth Tone would have an easier time growing since it "lacks a politics-saturated bureaucracy because it is a start-up".

== See also ==
- Shanghai United Media Group
- Qiushi
