= KCFJ =

- Alturas, California; United States
- Broadcast area: Sierra Nevada; Susanville, California; Lakeview, Oregon
- Frequency: 570 kHz
- Branding: CBS News Radio KCFJ

Programming
- Format: Various

Ownership
- Owner: EDI Media, Inc.
- Sister stations: KCNO

History
- First air date: 1951

Technical information
- Licensing authority: FCC
- Facility ID: 33733
- Class: D
- Power: 5,000 watts (day); 42 watts (night)
- Transmitter coordinates: 41°18′19.6″N 120°30′53.8″W

Links
- Public license information: Public file; LMS
- Website: kcfj570.com

KCFJ (570 AM) is a radio station licensed to Alturas, California, United States, that carries a variety of formats including adult standards and talk radio. The station is currently owned by EDI Media, Inc.
