= Xinmin Weekly =

Chinese news magazine

- Founded: 1999
- Company: SUMG
- Based in: Shanghai
- Website: xinminweekly.com.cn
- ISSN: 1008-5017

Xinmin Weekly (simplified Chinese: 新民周刊; traditional Chinese: 新民週刊; pinyin: Xīnmín Zhōukān), literally meaning "New People Weekly", or "New Citizen Weekly", is a weekly news magazine published in Shanghai, China. It is owned by the Shanghai United Media Group. The magazine was officially launched on January 4, 1999.

== History ==
Xinmin Weekly is Shanghai's first comprehensive weekly news magazine, as the first newly created media after Wenhui Bao and Xinmin Evening News jointly formed a newspaper group.
