= Lee Tze Chung =

Hong Kong journalist

- 李子誦
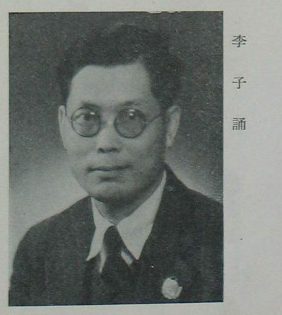
- Born: 李頌; 21 May 1911
- Died: 11 May 2012; Tung Wah Group of Hospitals Fung Yiu King Hospital
- Occupation: Journalist

Lee Tze Chung
- Traditional Chinese: 李子誦
- Simplified Chinese: 李子诵
Transcriptions
Standard Mandarin
- Hanyu Pinyin: Lǐ Zǐsòng
- Wade–Giles: Li^{3} Tzŭ^{3}-song^{4}
Yue: Cantonese
- Yale Romanization: Lèih Jí-chuhng
- Jyutping: Lei5 Zi2-zung6
- IPA: [lej˩˧ tsi˧˥tsʊŋ˨]

Lee Tze Chung (Chinese: 李子誦; 21 May 1911 – 11 May 2012) was a Hong Kong journalist. He was the president of pro-Beijing newspaper Wen Wei Po from 1952 to his dismissal in 1989, when he criticised the Chinese government for the 1989 Tiananmen Square massacre.

== Early life ==
Lee Chung was born on 21 May 1911 in Shunde, Guangdong province, China. He had only attended sishu, a form of private school in imperial China.

== Early journalistic career ==
Lee began his journalism career at age 16 as a proofreader for The Seventy-two Guilds Commercial Daily News in Guangzhou and later the editor of Greater China News.

In 1931, Lee was arrested for sympathising with student protesters against the Japanese invasion of Manchuria after the Mukden Incident. After his release from prison, Lee founded and became the editor-in-chief of Livelihood News. He then became the editorial director of Superior News in Hong Kong and of Integrity News of Guangzhou; he became the editor-in-chief of the latter during the Second Sino-Japanese War. He was also the editorial director of Daguang News, a newspaper in Guangzhouwan during the war.

After the Chinese Civil War resumed following the end of World War II, Lee began advocating for cooperation between Kuomintang and the Chinese Communist Party (CCP) with his newspapers. On 2 June 1947, when students across China were protesting against the civil war, Lee — then editor-in-chief of Jianguo Ribao — was arrested by Kuomintang military police in Guangzhou as part of a mass arrest of journalists. He was released 12 days later.

Lee later founded and became the editor-in-chief of the Hong Kong newspaper Weekly News while serving as editor of The Chinese Business News and the monthly magazine Freedom. In 1949, he became the editor-in-chief of United News in Guangzhou, a newspaper controlled by the CCP's United Front Work Department for South China.

He became the vice president of the All-China Journalists Association's Guangzhou branch in 1950.

== Editor-in-chief of Wen Wei Po: 1951–1989 ==
When leftist Kuomintang member Li Jishen co-founded Wen Wei Po in the 1950s, he gave Lee a share in the newspaper valued at HK$7,000 at the time and one-quarter to one-fifth ownership in the newspaper at founding. Lee later transferred his stake to the state.

In 1951, Lee became the editor-in-chief of the newspaper's Hong Kong edition. During his 39-year tenure, the newspaper began assigning foreign correspondents and establishing subsidiaries to increase income.

In 1952, the Hong Kong government charged Lee on suspicion of having published seditious articles after Wen Wei Po republished an editorial from People's Daily — the official newspaper of the Central Committee of the Chinese Communist Party — that criticised Hong Kong authorities after a demonstration that resulted in the death of a protester. Mass demonstrations broke out after the city government allegedly denied entry to a delegation sent by Guangzhou authorities to console victims of the November 1951 Tung Tau Tsuen fire. Two other pro-Beijing newspapers, Ta Kung Pao and New Evening Post, also republished the article. Lee attended court with eight other owners, publishers, editors and printers of the newspapers, who were released on bail for HK$10,000 each. Only Ta Kung Pao and its two senior staff members were convicted before Chinese Premier Zhou Enlai publicly demanded that Hong Kong withdraw the lawsuit. Prosecutors dropped the case after the British government instructed Hong Kong to rescind the court's sentence against Ta Kung Pao.

In 1978, Lee was promoted to president of Wen Wei Po.

=== 1989 Tiananmen Square protests and massacre ===
On 21 May 1989, Wen Wei Po published a four-character editorial that read "deep grief and bitter hatred" in response to the People's Liberation Army enforced martial law during the pro-democracy protests at Tiananmen Square. The decision was made by Lee, acting editor-in-chief Zeng Minzhi, and board member Kam Yiu-yu, with the support of Xu Jiatun and Zhang Junsheng, respectively the director and deputy director of Xinhua News Agency's Hong Kong bureau, China's de facto embassy in Hong Kong. Zhang later denied his involvement.

According to Lau Yui-siu, a Beijing correspondent for Wen Wei Po, Lee said all truths about the protests could be reported, and he would bear the consequences. The night before the military crackdown on protesters on 4 June, Lee wrote an opinion piece calling for Chinese leaders to "rein in the horse at the brink of the cliff" but was disappointed that it was too late to prevent the Chinese Communist Party from "massacring the masses" and "brutally cracking down on the people".

A month after the Tiananmen Square massacre, Lee fired Wen Wei Po's deputy director Chen Bojian, who attempted to realign the newspaper's stance with that of the Chinese government and criticised Lee for his position. On 15 July, Xinhua News Agency's Hong Kong bureau intervened. Deputy Director Zhang Junsheng announced in an editorial meeting at 2:00 am that Xinhua had accepted the resignation Lee had tendered in 1985, which had been refused at the time. About 30 Wen Wei Po journalists resigned in support of Lee.

Media scholar Paul Lee said Hong Kong newspapers, including Wen Wei Po, had transcended the position of political parties and acted in favour of the "highest national interest" before and after the crackdown.

== After Wen Wei Po ==
By September 1989, Lee had plans to launch another publication. He approached Jimmy Lai, the founder of the Giordano fashion chain, for financial support, but talks broke down after they disagreed on the editorial policy.

A few months later, Lee and former deputy Ching Cheong launched Contemporary, a weekly magazine focused on China that included news, analysis, and opinion pieces. The first issue sold 50,000 copies and operated out of an office in Causeway Bay.

At 78, Lee continued to write a weekly commentary and biography and spent three afternoons in the office every week.

However, the magazine launched with little advertising. Ching said that was because advertisers saw Contemporary as a publication that confronted Xinhua. The magazine later became a monthly publication. It ceased publishing in 1995 because of financial losses of HK$100,000 per month, according to Ching.

== Political career ==
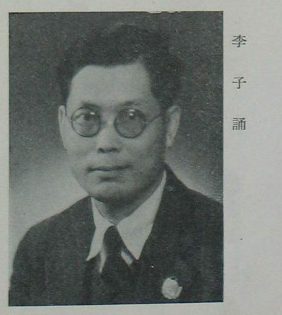
Lee's portrait in a book published by CPPCC to commemorate its first meeting

Lee had been active in politics since the founding of the People's Republic of China. He was an alternate member in the delegation representing the Kuomintang Democratic Promotion Association in the first meeting of the Chinese People's Political Consultative Conference (CPPCC) held on 21 September 1949 in Beiping. The association, which mainly consisted of intellectuals from education, cultural, publishing and scientific sectors, was later merged into the Revolutionary Committee of the Chinese Kuomintang.

Lee was a central committee member of the KMT Revolutionary Committee from 1983 to 1992.

In 1985, he opposed China issuing the Hong Kong Dollar after the city's sovereignty is transferred to China in 1997 to become a special administrative region. He said using the Renminbi in Hong Kong after 1997 would reduce corruption.

After criticising the 1989 Tiananmen Square massacre, Lee took leave from a CPPCC meeting in July 1989 and stopped attending CPPCC sessions and committee meetings since.

== Personal life ==
Lee was married to Law Siu Lan, a teacher. At 71, Law died of a chronic illness on 30 March 1981 at Hong Kong Sanatorium and Hospital and her body was cremated at Cape Collinson Crematorium.

== Death ==
Lee died on 11 May 2012 at the Tung Wah Group of Hospitals Fung Yiu King Hospital from multiple organ failure, having been hospitalised since late 2011. Xinhua News Agency reported his death in a short article consisting of 35 Chinese characters but did not mention details of Lee's life.

Beijing supporters and officials of the Chinese government organised a public memorial at Hong Kong Funeral Home, which was attended by Li Gang, the deputy director of the Hong Kong Liaison Office, and former members of the National People's Congress from Hong Kong. His body was cremated at Cape Collinson Crematorium.
