= Oriental Sports Daily =

Simplified Chinese newspaper

Oriental Sports Daily (Chinese: 东方体育日报; pinyin: Dōngfāng Tǐyù Rìbào), formerly called Xinmin Sports, was the first Chinese sports newspaper, apart from China Sports.

After the investment from the three big state companies, it was renamed to be Oriental Sports Daily, which was set up on May 18, 2002. It is owned by Wenhui-xinmin United Press Group.
