= KCNO =

- Alturas, California; United States
- Frequency: 94.5 MHz
- Branding: Chino 94.5

Programming
- Format: Country

Ownership
- Owner: EDI Media, Inc.
- Sister stations: KCFJ

History
- Former call signs: KBGX (1980–1984); KYAX (1984–1996); KKFJ (1996–1996)

Technical information
- Licensing authority: FCC
- Facility ID: 33732
- Class: C1
- ERP: 100,000 watts
- HAAT: −59.0 meters (−193.6 ft)
- Transmitter coordinates: 41°33′50″N 120°24′55″W

Links
- Public license information: Public file; LMS
- Website: KCNO website

KCNO (94.5 FM) is a radio station broadcasting a country music format. Licensed to Alturas, California, United States, the station is currently owned by EDI Media, Inc. and features programming from Jones Radio Network.

== History ==
The station was assigned the call sign KBGX on 1980-11-26. On 1984-04-19, the station changed its call sign to KYAX, on 1996-04-15 to KKFJ, and finally on 1996-08-09 to the current KCNO.
