= Shanghai Law Journal =

Chinese legal publication

- Owner: Shanghai United Media Group
- Founded: January 2, 1984
- Language: Chinese
- Headquarters: Lane 268-1, Xiaomuqiao Road, Shanghai
- Website: www.shfzb.com.cn

The Shanghai Law Journal (上海法制报) is a law journal published in Shanghai, China. The publication advocates for socialist democracy and socialist law.

Prior to its launch, the publication issued seven trial editions. The journal was founded on 2 January 1984 and was published by the Shanghai Legal Daily Agency (Chinese: 上海法制报社). When it was founded, it was published issues weekly containing two sheets, each of which had four pages. Beginning in 1985, at the end of every month, the journal published an additional eight-page quarto formatted paper. It became a weekly paper in 1986 and then a twice-a-week newspaper in 1991, publishing one issue on Monday on one on the weekend. In 1994, it began publishing three editions a week. At its height, the publication had a circulation of 600,000.
