= Shanghai Women's Prison =

Women's prison in Shanghai, China

- Simplified Chinese: 上海市女子监狱
- Traditional Chinese: 上海市女子監獄
Transcriptions
Standard Mandarin
- Hanyu Pinyin: Shànghǎishì Nǚzǐ Jiānyù

Shanghai Women's Prison (Chinese: 上海市女子监狱), also called Songjiang Women's Prison, is a women's prison in Songjiang District, Shanghai, China. It is a part of the Shanghai Prison Administrative Bureau.

It has over 1,000 prisoners and is the only such correctional facility for women in the direct-controlled municipality. Its prisoners had committed murder, embezzlement, theft, fraud, assault, drug offenses, and other crimes.

The prison has a mother and daughter program for young women who are incarcerated. This program began in 2014.

A fire occurred in 2013.
