= News Evening Post =

Chinese metropolitan evening newspaper (1999-2014)

- Type: Evening newspaper
- Founded: January 1, 1999
- Ceased publication: January 1, 2014
- Website: newspaper.jfdaily.com/xwwb/

The News Evening Post (Chinese: 新闻晚报), or Xinwen Wanbao, also known as Xinwen Evening News or Shanghai Evening News or Shanghai Evening Post, was a Shanghai-based Chinese-language metropolitan evening newspaper published in China.

News Evening Post was officially launched on 1 January 1999 and was part of the Jiefang Daily Press Group (解放日报报业集团).

== History ==
News Evening Post was formally founded on January 1, 1999. On January 1, 2014, it officially ceased publication.
