= Shanghai Municipal Prison Administration =

Chinese municipal agency

The Shanghai Municipal Prison Administration (Chinese: 上海市监狱管理局) is an agency of the Shanghai Municipal Bureau of Justice of Shanghai, China, a direct-controlled municipality.

== Prisons ==
- Shanghai Women's Prison
- Qingpu Prison
