= Peter William Humphrey =

British journalist and private detective

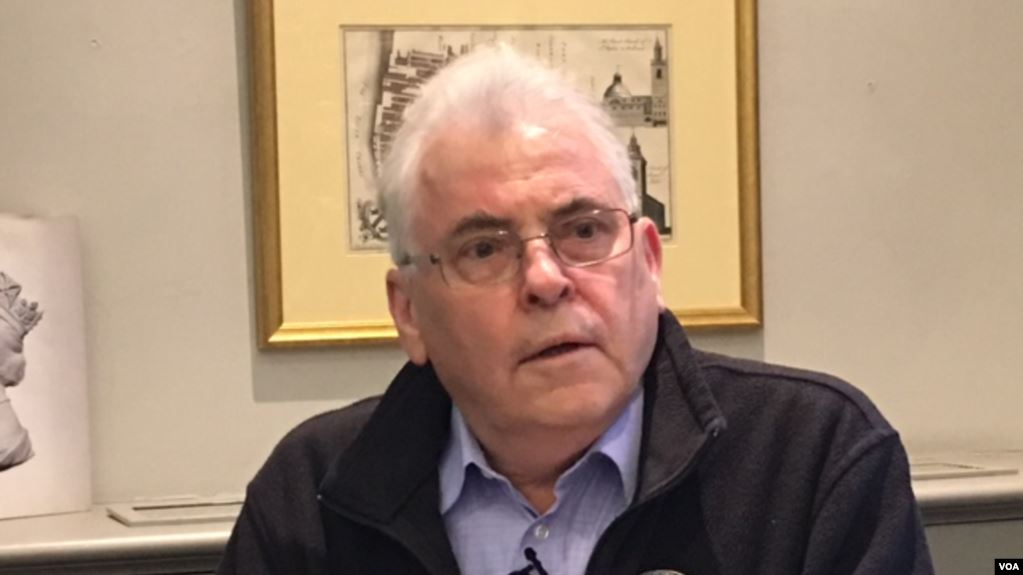
- Peter Humphrey filmed by Voice of America
- Born: March 1956 (age 69–70); United Kingdom
- Other names: 韩飞龙
- Occupations: Private detective; journalist

Peter William Humphrey (born March 1956), commonly known as Han Feilong (Chinese: 韩飞龙) in China, is a British former journalist and private detective, known for his arrest by the Shanghai Police due to allegations that he illegally acquired personal data of Vivian Shi, a Chinese citizen with connections to the Shanghai communist elite. After his release from China in 2018, following two years' detention, he claimed Shanghai was the most corrupt city in China and described the torment he had suffered at Qingpu Prison to global media. The case was described by one expert as 'possible selective prosecution.' In December 2019, he wrote an article for The Sunday Times about a London family who bought charity cards from Tesco and found appeals for help written from Qingpu Prison on the cards, which drew global attention to the prison where Humphrey was held.

== Early career ==
During the 1980s and 1990s, Humphrey worked for Reuters as a correspondent. Since the late 1990s, he began doing jobs in risk management. In 2003, he founded a risk management company called ChinaWhys (Chinese: 中慧), whose websites claimed to provide creative solutions to tricky business problems in China.

In 2004, he and his Chinese American wife Yu Yingzeng founded Shelian Consultation (Shanghai) Co., Ltd. in Shanghai, whose clients were mostly large multinational corporations in China. The company hired dozens of employees, among which Humphrey was the general manager of the company and his wife the legal representative.

== Arrest and trial ==
=== GlaxoSmithKline's China bribery accusation ===
In March 2013, secretly filmed sex videos of Mark Reilly, GlaxoSmithKline's then head in China, were emailed to 13 senior executives of the company, including the CEO Andrew Witty. According to The Sunday Times, the videos were accompanied by detailed accusations of the company's "pervasive bribery" in China made by an anonymous writer called "gskwhistleblower".

Since April 2013, ChinaWhys was paid by British drug maker GlaxoSmithKline to investigate into the source of the sex tapes. Humphrey submitted his report on 6 June 2013 to GlaxoSmithKline reporting on his investigations. The Sunday Times said that Humphrey was unaware of the company's bribery allegations until June. In the same month, the Chinese police made public their investigations into GlaxoSmithKline's bribery in China.

In July, the case went into legal processes. On 18 August 2013, Humphrey and his wife were arrested by Shanghai police. In May 2014, Mark Reilly was arrested due to allegations he was directly involved in and encouraged bribery.

Humphrey was initially held at the Shanghai Detention Center and later moved to Qingpu Prison.

=== Televised confession ===
In 2013 CGTN broadcast a confession "We obtained personal information by illegal means", in a context that implied Humphrey and Yu had done this to some 60 victims per year for an indeterminate number of years. Ofcom later upheld a complaint that CGTN's UK broadcast of this violated their fairness and privacy regulations.

=== Televised trial in Shanghai ===
The Humphrey couple was arrested in August 2013, yet the formal prosecution was not made until July 2014 when the couple was accused of "illegal acquisition of personal data of Chinese citizens." On 8 August 2014, Humphrey and his wife were tried in No. 1 Intermediate People's Court of Shanghai Municipality. As the case was the first case of "illegal acquisition of personal data" in China that involved foreign citizens, the trial was made public on Weibo, which also made the case the first broadcast trial of crimes involving foreigners.

Relatives of defendants, representatives of the UK and US consulates, deputies to National People's Congress, member of the CPPCC, ordinary Shanghai citizens, and Chinese media were present in the trial, while foreign media was excluded as requested by Humphrey. The prosecutor said that Humphrey and his wife were paid by several clients to investigate illegally into personal data of Chinese companies and Chinese citizens and sold the data to their clients, through which they earned several million RMB. According to Xinhua, a state run media agency, the information included the family member's information, the content of the household register, information on real estate ownership, car ownership, telephone records, and records of leaving and entering China. The information was said to be acquired through illegal trade, secret filming and stalking. The court ruled that Humphrey should be imprisoned for two and a half years and fined 200 thousand RMB before being deported from China.

Although his wife Yu Yingzeng was a US citizen, the court considered her personal and criminal circumstances and did not expel her from China. Yu said she never knew acquiring third-hand personal data was illegal in mainland China and admitted they had done similar investigations in Hong Kong and other areas. Humphrey said during his pre-trial detention that he had been deceived by GlaxoSmithKline, which did not tell him details of the severity of the company's bribery.

According to Chinese media The Paper, some employees of other foreign pharmaceutical companies in China interviewed by The Paper told it that Vivian Shi, a former Chinese female executive at GlaxoSmithKline China's government affairs department who was born in 1964, should have been involved in reporting the company's bribery to the senior executives of the company and the Chinese government. According to the Financial Times, Humphrey explained that Shi had used her connections to the communist party elite to have him jailed. He was told she managed to acquire a copy of Humphrey's report. Humphrey believed she was the whistleblower.

== Release and deportation ==
In June 2015, Humphrey was released ahead of schedule due to health issues. Then he was sent to a Shanghai hospital which made a diagnosis of cancer. After leaving the hospital, he was deported from China. His wife was released the same month. The UK Consulate in Shanghai issued them new emergency passports so that they could return to the UK. Humphrey was banned from entering China for 10 years. After returning to the UK, the couple still faced health and financial difficulties. Humphrey was diagnosed with prostate cancer, which Humphrey claimed had been worsened by poor conditions and delayed treatment in prison. He also claimed he was denied medical care in order to pressure him to confess. In March 2017, they sued GlaxoSmithKline for having misled them about the unpredictable legal risk and sought compensation. GlaxoSmithKline believed this accusation to be unreasonable.

After returning to the UK, Humphrey maintained his innocence and argued that his confession was forced and the broadcast footage by CCTV was doctored. In 2020, UK watchdog Ofcom ruled that broadcasting the footage had violated British broadcasting regulations and Humphrey's privacy and that the station would be sanctioned.

== Tesco charity cards ==
On 22 December 2019, Humphrey wrote an article for The Sunday Times, which soon made global headlines. The article reported that a girl from Tooting, South London, England found a call for help in a charity card bought from Tesco, which claimed it had been written by foreign prisoners at Qingpu Prison, Shanghai, and asked for contact with Humphrey. Humphrey said that the girl's father had contacted Humphrey, so he wrote the article. He also claimed to know who had written the call for help. Yunguang, the printing company which had made the cards, denied the allegations. Guang Shuang, China's Foreign Ministry spokesperson, denied that there was forced labor at Qingpu.

== Family ==
Humphrey and his wife Yu Yingzeng (Chinese: 虞英曾) have a son.
