= Shanghai Detention Center =

Prison in Shanghai, China

- Location: Pudong, Shanghai
- Status: Operational

Notable prisoners
- Stern Hu, Australian businessman Peter William Humphrey, British journalist and private detective Zhang Zhan, former lawyer and citizen journalist

Shanghai Detention Center (SDC) (Chinese: 上海市看守所; Pinyin: shànghǎishì kānshǒusuǒ) is located in Pudong, Shanghai, about 32 kilometres (20 mi) outside of downtown Shanghai. The facility houses serious domestic criminals and all foreigners suspected of infractions.

== Overview ==
The facility's primary housing unit is a 3-story building. The building is segregated into East- and West-wing on each floor. Each floor is supervised by a cadre of around 6 guards around the clock aided by a "counselor" from 9 – 5. Each floor is divided into roughly 14 units of cell. Each cell is about 6 meters by 2.5 meters; Latrine and toilet are on one side of the wall while open bars sit on the other end of the wall. In the middle of the room is a massive cubby board that has a dual top. The top portion is opened and folded back flat to form an 8-men sleeping space. Nominal capacity of 10 people means 2 other people will sleep on the walk way uncovered by the top board. All detainees are kept in this close quarter 24 hours a day, 7 days a week. Occasionally, they are released to the "exercise court" that measures about 4 x 4 (meters) with no view of outside. Hot water showers are provided once in week during winter time, but detainees typically take daily showers inside the cell. Males and females occupy different floor.

Morning bell rings at 6:00 a.m. Breakfast is served around 7:30 a.m. Chinese pop song morning drive program is on from 6:30 to around 8:00 a.m. during weekdays. Lunch and Dinner are served at 11:30 a.m. and 5:30 p.m., respectively. Meal carts are rotated around each cell and each cell is allocated adequate eating utensils.

SDC houses two kinds of people: Chinese nationals who are suspected of or being prosecuted for major infraction and foreigners regardless of nature of infraction. The typical legal process starts when local police makes determination if a person is to be sent to SDC. Once a person arrives at SDC, police has 7 days to determine if the person will be officially arrested; such determination may take up to 7 – 9 days. Empicially very few are ever released from SDC once arrived; typically, a person is moved to "investigation" stage and the law provides another 30-day detention period until police has completed such investigation. This phase can theoretically be extended twice for a total of another 60 days.

Only when a case is moved to prosecution can the suspect speak to his/her attorney. Attorney meeting need to be approved and accompanied by prosecutors; individuals can speak to attorneys privately but such private meeting is monitored. The prosecution phase is another 30-day window that can be further extended.

=== Sanitation ===
Detainees generally are subject to a daily shower convention: shower takes place by the sink in each cell (sink provides only cold water). Showers are typically allowed after dinner without regard for seasonality. This daily shower is considered a "cell" rule. The detention center provides weekly hot shower but such showers are at the mercy of the furnace.

=== Communication with outside world ===
International detainees can be visited by home country consular. Such visit is the only venue whereby detainees can communicate with family and friends—detainees do not have phone privileges at all. Such visits must be approved by either the Police department or the district attorney, depending on case progression, and could be accompanied by a Chinese translator. Detainees are not allowed to provide written communication to visitors. Visitors are allowed to bring some outside cooking (or juices) to detainees.

Lawyer visitations are allowed but require prior approval by police or district attorneys. Any other visitation is strictly prohibited. There are charlatan "brokers" who profit from promises of visitations that are never delivered.

=== Daily living ===
Each detainee could receive a monthly family stipend. The Center keeps pretty detailed and precise ledger of each detainees' account. Each detainee is allowed to use up to x dollar of its stipend balance to procure food supplements, including candies, sweets, snacks, fruits, and extra clothing, once a month. At the time of discharge, unused balance is returned. Unfortunately, most international detainees have not the means to obtain such stipend.
