= Oriental Morning Post =

Chinese-language morning newspaper published in China

- Type: Daily newspaper
- Founded: July 7, 2003
- Ceased publication: January 1, 2017
- Headquarters: Shanghai
- Website: www.dfdaily.com

The Oriental Morning Post (Chinese: 东方早报; pinyin: Dōngfāng Zǎobào), or Dongfang Zaobao, also known as Oriental Morning News, was a Shanghai-based Chinese-language morning newspaper published in China. The newspaper was jointly founded by Nanfang Daily and Wenhui Xinmin United Newspaper Industry Group (文汇新民报业集团) on July 7, 2003.

In the fall of 2008, Oriental Morning Post was the first media outlet to expose the melamine contamination of Chinese infant milk powder.

== History ==
Oriental Morning Post was established on July 7, 2003. In September 2008, the newspaper was the first to report on the "Sanlu tainted milk powder incident".

On March 17, 2014, Oriental Morning Post was revised, with the new edition adding more news analysis and in-depth coverage. On January 1, 2017, it stopped publication.
