= Jiefang Daily =

Chinese Communist Party newspaper

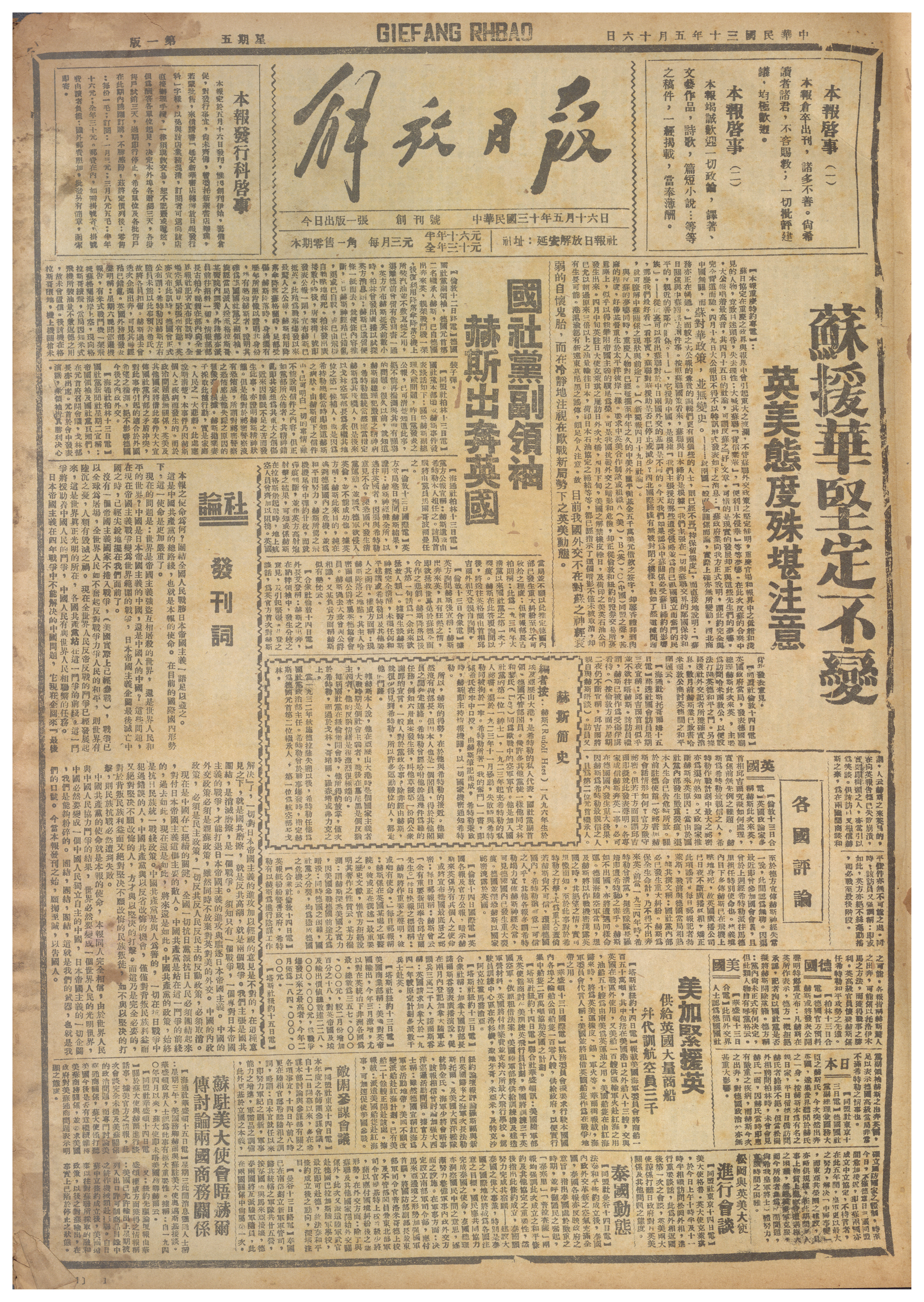
- First issue of the Jiefang Daily published 16 May 1941
- Native name: 解放日报社
- Type: Daily
- Format: Broadsheet
- Owner(s): Shanghai Committee of Chinese Communist Party; Shanghai United Media Group
- Publisher: Shanghai United Media Group; Jiefang Daily Press (解放日报社)
- Founded: May 28, 1949
- Political alignment: Chinese Communist Party
- Language: Chinese
- Headquarters: Jing'an District, Shanghai, China
- OCLC number: 41624020
- Website: www.jfdaily.com

Jiefang Daily (Chinese: 解放日报; pinyin: Jiěfàng Rìbào), also translated as Liberation Daily, is the official daily newspaper of the Shanghai Municipal Committee of the Chinese Communist Party (CCP). The Shanghai-based paper began publication in 1949, adopting the name of the Yan'an-based CCP newspaper which had ceased publication two years earlier.

== History ==
Jiefang Daily (Liberation Daily) was published in Yan'an beginning on 16 May 1941. It published the famous editorial Without the Communist Party, There Would Be No New China. Mao Zedong provided regular instruction for the paper's operations and also contributed articles and essays for publication in it.

During the editorial tenure of Lu Dingyi, Jiefang Daily increased its focus on promulgating CCP policies. Because the CCP relied on grassroots cadre to communicate its messages to the masses at a time when literacy was still limited, the newspaper used simple and direct language. In an effort to give clear instruction, it typically published a piece of reporting side-by-side with an instructive editorial. Seeking to implement principles of the mass line, the newspaper dispatched reporters to collect news stories from villagers and sought contributions from local cultural workers. Circulation methods included village newspaper reading groups, community blackboards and bulletin boards, night study groups, and public meetings.

Lu established the requirement that the paper's content had to be approved by the CCP. During Lu's tenure, the paper became more aligned with those who supported Mao's leadership, and less with the Soviet-leaning and Comintern-leaning members of party leadership.

The Yan'an-based paper stopped operating 27 March 1947 when the CCP headquarters moved out of Yan'an because attack by the Nationalists was imminent.

The newspaper has traditionally been designated as an official "mouthpiece" (Chinese: 喉舌; lit. 'throat tongue') of the CCP.

In March 2018, Jiefang Daily won the Third National Top 100 Newspapers in China.

In October 2020, the United States Department of State designated Jiefang Daily as a foreign mission of China.

== See also ==
- List of newspapers in China
- Yan'an Rectification Movement
