= Wenhui Bao =

Shanghai-based Chinese language newspaper

- Native name: 文汇报
- Type: Daily newspaper
- Format: Broadsheet
- Owner: Shanghai United Media Group
- Founded: January 25, 1938
- Political alignment: Chinese Communist Party
- Language: Chinese
- Headquarters: Shanghai
- Website: www.whb.cn
- Free online archives: dzb.whb.cn

Wenhui Bao
- Traditional Chinese: 文匯報
- Simplified Chinese: 文汇报
Transcriptions
Standard Mandarin
- Hanyu Pinyin: Wénhuì Bào

Wenhui Bao, anglicized as the Wenhui Daily, is a Chinese daily newspaper published by the Shanghai United Media Group.

== History ==
Wenhui Bao was founded in Shanghai on January 25, 1938 by leftist-leaning intellectuals centered on writer and journalist Ke Ling. Over the next decade, it was closed down twice for its political leanings.

In 2024, Rappler reported that the Manila bureau chief of Wenhui Bao from 2021 until 2024, Zhang "Steve" Song, was an undercover Ministry of State Security (MSS) operative who worked closely with Huawei and gathered intelligence about the internal dynamics and politics of key personalities in the Philippines' defense and security sectors.
