= Xinmin Evening News =

State-owned daily newspaper in Shanghai, China

- Native name: 新民晚报
- Type: Daily newspaper
- Owner: Shanghai United Media Group
- Founded: 9 September 1929; 96 years ago
- Language: Chinese
- Headquarters: 4/F, Shanghai United Media Group Building, No. 755 Weihai Road, Shanghai, China
- Country: China
- Website: www.xinmin.cn

Chinese name
- Simplified Chinese: 新民晚报
Transcriptions
Standard Mandarin
- Hanyu Pinyin: Xīnmín Wǎnbào

Xinmin Evening News, formerly known as Xinmin Po, is a Chinese-language newspaper published since September 1929 in Shanghai, China. It is owned by Shanghai United Media Group, a state-owned enterprise controlled by the Shanghai Municipal Committee of the Chinese Communist Party.

== History ==
In 1990, Xinmin Evening News personnel were dispatched to the U.S. to found an American edition to counter negative perceptions of the Chinese government following the 1989 Tiananmen Square protests and massacre.

In March 2018, Xinmin Evening News won the Third National Top 100 Newspapers in China.

In October 2020, the United States Department of State designated Xinmin Evening News as a foreign mission of the Chinese government. The newspaper is published in the United States by EDI Media.
