= Zhao Jin =

Zhao Jin may refer to:

- Zhao Jin (linguist), Chinese linguist
- Jin Zhao (physicist) (赵瑾), Chinese physicist
- Jin Zhao (director) (金钊), Chinese TV director.
- Jin Zhao (journalist) (金照), Chinese journalist, Former Chairman of the China Television Artists Association.
- Zhao Jin (swimmer), Chinese swimmer
- /Jin Zhao/ the main role of the man in the Chinese drama "Speed And Love".

== See also ==
- Zhao Jing (disambiguation)
