= Jiao Li =

Chinese politician

Jiao Li (Chinese: 焦利) (born April 1955) is the former president of China Central Television (CCTV).

== Career ==
Jiao Li worked for Liaoning Daily and later became the head of the Publicity Department of the CCP Liaoning Provincial Committee (Chinese: 中国共产党辽宁省委员会. In October 2008, he became the Vice Minister of the Publicity Department of the Chinese Communist Party. On May 16, 2009, he succeeded Zhao Huayong (Chinese: 赵化勇) as the director of the China Central Television. After being removed as president of China Central Television in November 2011, he was transferred to the General Administration of Press and Publications (GAPP). In 2012, Jiao Li has been dismissed as deputy director of GAPP over rumored links to corruption and sex scandals.

Government offices
Preceded by Zhao Huayong	President of China Central Television; May 2009 – November 2011	Succeeded by Hu Zhanfan
