= Hrvoje Petek =

- Born: January 13, 1958; Zagreb, Croatia
- Education: Massachusetts Institute of Technology (1980, B.S., Chemistry); University of California, Berkeley (1985, Ph.D., Chemistry)
- Known for: Ultrafast laser spectroscopy, Ultrafast microscopy, Plasmonics, Two-photon photoelectron spectroscopy
- Scientific career
- Fields: Experimental physics
- Workplaces: Institute for Molecular Science; Hitachi; University of Pittsburgh

Hrvoje Petek (born January 13, 1958) is a Croatian-born American physicist and the Richard King Mellon Professor of Physics and Astronomy, at the University of Pittsburgh.

== Education ==
Petek received his B.S. degree in chemistry from Massachusetts Institute of Technology in 1980. Subsequently, he obtained his Ph.D. degree in chemistry from the University of California, Berkeley in 1985. As a National Science Foundation pre-doctoral fellow, he developed a high-frequency and time resolution transient absorption instrument for spectroscopic and dynamical studies of small reactive gas phase molecules; his thesis on "Vibrational and electronic spectroscopy of singlet methylene" was awarded the best Ph.D. thesis in the Berkeley Chemistry Department in 1985.

== Research and career ==
As a Group Leader at the Hitachi Advanced Research Laboratory, and at the University of Pittsburgh, Petek has developed coherent photoelectron spectroscopy and microscopy as methods for studying the electronic dephasing and spatial propagation of polarization fields in solid state materials and nanostructures. He uses intense femtosecond laser pulses to perform nonlinear multiphoton photoemission spectroscopy, as a form of Floquet engineering.

Petek's research has been performed on metal oxide and metal surfaces. Metal oxides are of interest in photocatalysis involving electron charge and energy transfer to molecules or particle plasmon generated hot electrons. Metals dominantly respond coherently to light, as one can see in a mirror, with responses ranging from collective plasmons to hot electrons. This research has had strong contributions from theorists at the Institute of Physics in Zagreb, Croatia.

Petek's research has extended to dressing of electronic structures of solids by applied electric fields. He has combined the time structure of femtosecond laser pulses with high spatial resolution of electron microscopy to develop interferometric time-resolved photoemission electron microscopy. This has enabled recording of movies, with ~50 attosecond per frame advance, of light propagating at the speed of light as surface plasmon polaritons. Further, by imaging of light structured by spin-orbit interaction he found that plasmonic vortices that form host new type of topological quasiparticles, plasmonic merons and skyrmions, and their arrays. Remarkably, he discovered that plasmonic vortices are uniquely the focus of coherent E∙B field interactions.

In addition, Petek engaged in scanning tunneling microscopy and spectroscopy, where his focus has been on the spatial structure of electronic states. Together with Taketoshi Minato, Maki Kawai, Jin Zhao, Jinlong Yang and Jianguo Hou, Petek explained the delocalized electronic structure created by the remaining charge at an oxygen vacancy on titanium dioxide surface. Furthermore, with Min Feng, and Jin Zhao, Petek discovered atom-like superatom states of C60, and similar hollow molecules. With Shijing Tan, they demonstrated that such subnanometer molecular voids support delocalized quantum states that enable coherent electron transfer through molecular materials.

In addition to his academic research, Petek has been editor-in-chief of Progress in Surface Science (2006-2025), he is the Steering Committee Chair of the Interdisciplinary Quantum (IQ) Initiative at the University of Pittsburgh. He is a member of the international advisory committee of the International Symposium on Ultrafast Surface Science and co-organizer of the International Symposium on Ultrafast Phenomena and Light-Matter Interaction in Quantum Materials, Zadar, Croatia. Petek has had advisory roles at the National Institute for Materials Science (2015-2019), Institute for Molecular Science, and Japan Atomic Energy Agency (2023–present). Most recently, he is engaged as a Fulbright Specialist at the Institute of Physics.

== Awards and honors ==
- 2024 International Fellow of the Japan Society of Vacuum and Surface Science
- 2019 Ahmed Zewail Award in Ultrafast Science and Technology
- 2018 American Association for the Advancement of Science Fellows
- 2013 Morino Lecture, Kyoto Japan
- 2005 Chancellor's Distinguished Research Award, University of Pittsburgh
- 2002 Fellow, American Physical Society
- 1996–1999, 2003–2006 NEDO Joint International Research Grant Awardee
- 1985-1988 National Science Postdoctoral Fellow (IMS Japan)
- 1985-1985 Yamada Science Foundation Fellow
- 1980-1983 National Science Foundation Predoctoral Fellow
