= Zhao of Jin =

Zhao of Jin may refer to:

- Marquis Zhao of Jin (died 739 BC)
- Duke Zhao of Jin (died 526 BC)

== See also ==
- Zhao Jin (disambiguation)
