= Wang Weichao =

Wang Weichao (March 12, 1927-, Chinese: 王维超), born in Zhaoyuan, Shandong, is a director of the People's Republic of China.

== Biography ==
He has created and directed more than 20 TV dramas, including Who's the Aunt, On the Long March, The Sound of Bells, Magpies on New Branches, Black Peonies, etc. and choreographed and directed more than 20 programs, including comprehensive cultural and artistic evenings. 1983 saw the publication of China's first theoretical treatise on the art of television, A Primer on Television Drama. Later, he became a member of the Bureau of China Television Artists Association.
