= Yang Weiguang =

Yang Weiguang (1935 - September 20, 2014, Chinese: 杨伟光), a native of Mei County, Guangdong Province, a Hakka, and a Chinese media personality, was the president of China Central Television (CCTV), a vice-chairman of the China Federation of Literary and Art Circles (CFL), and the president of China Association of Television Artists (CAVA).

== Biography ==
In October 1956, he joined the Chinese Communist Party, graduated from the Department of Journalism of Renmin University of China in 1961 (at that time it was the Department of Journalism of the Chinese Language Department of Peking University, which was later merged into the Department of Journalism of the Renmin University of China), and went to work for the Central People's Broadcasting Station (CPB), where he worked as an editor, a reporter, a deputy director, and a deputy director, and then moved to the CCTV as a vice-director in 1985, and then to the president of CCTV in December 1991. In May 1994, he became a deputy minister of the Ministry of Radio, Film and Television with the president of CCTV. During his time at CCTV, he launched such well-known programs as "Xinwen Lianbo", "Focus Interview" and "Oriental Time", and pushed forward the reform of CCTV. He also directed the production of TV dramas such as Founding Leader Mao Zedong, The Long March, Deng Xiaoping in 1950, and Taiping Heavenly Kingdom, and organized the production of the sitcom Home with Kids.

In February 1999, he left his presidency of CCTV. In September 2002, he became the dean of the School of Media and Design at Shanghai Jiaotong University. On September 23, 2013, he attended the opening ceremony of the World Hakka Conference. On the evening of September 20, 2014, Yang Weiguang died at the age of 79 due to illness.

Government offices
Preceded by Huang Huiqun	President of China Central Television; 1991 – February 1999	Succeeded by Zhao Huayong
