= Liao Ken =

Liao Ken (Chinese: 廖恳; born in January 1971 in Suining, Sichuan) is a political figure in the People's Republic of China.

== Biography ==
=== Beijing ===
Liao joined the Chinese Communist Party (CCP) in October 1992. He graduated from Zhejiang University in August 1993, majoring in electrical machinery and its control. In April 1998, Liao began working at the Youth Volunteer Action Guidance Center under the Central Committee of the Communist Youth League of China. By November 2000, he was serving as the deputy director of both the Fund Division and the Comprehensive Guidance Division of the center. In October 2003, he became the director of the Comprehensive Guidance Division and the Project Planning Division. In March 2011, Liao was appointed deputy director of the Youth Volunteer Action Guidance Center.

In October 2012, Liao assumed the role of deputy director of the Literary and Artistic Volunteer Service Center at the China Literary and Artistic Association (Chinese: 中国文艺志愿者协会). By December 2013, he was promoted to director of the center, as well as vice chairman and secretary general of the China Literary and Artistic Volunteer Association. In June 2019, Liao became the Chinese Communist Party Committee Secretary of the China Television Artists Association and the director of the Television Art Center of the China Federation of Literary and Artistic Associations, later also serving as the secretary general of the association in October.

=== Tibet ===
In October 2020, Liao was appointed deputy secretary of the CCP Shigatse Municipal Committee in the Tibet Autonomous Region. A year later, in October 2021, he took on the role of deputy secretary of the CCP Lhasa Municipal Committee in the Tibet Autonomous Region.
