= Ruolin =

- Gender: Feminine
- Language: Chinese

Origin
- Region of origin: East Asia

Other names
- Alternative spelling: Ruolin, Ruo-lin, Ruo Lin

Ruolin
- Chinese: 若琳
- Literal meaning: Like jade
Transcriptions
Standard Mandarin
- Hanyu Pinyin: ruòlín
- Wade–Giles: jo4 lin2

Ruolin is the English romanization of a female Chinese given name (Chinese: 若琳). Notable people with the given name include:

- Chen Ruolin (Chinese: 陈若琳) – Chinese diver
- Ruan Ruolin (Chinese: 阮若琳) – Chinese television producer
- Joanna Wang (Chinese: 王若琳) – Taiwanese-American singer-songwriter
- Xue Ruolin (Chinese: 薛若琳) – Chinese critic
- Li Ruolin (Chinese: 李若琳) – Chinese political official
