= Hu Zhifeng =

Chinese screenwriter (born 1965)

Hu Zhifeng (born 1965, Chinese: 胡智锋), native of Laizhou, Shandong, is a director and screenwriter in the People's Republic of China.

== Biography ==
Hu Zhifeng studied at Shandong University and Beijing Normal University. He began teaching at the Beijing Broadcasting Institute (now the Communication University of China) in 1988. He was promoted to lecturer in 1992, associate professor in 1996, and full professor in 2000. Since 2016, he has been teaching at Beijing Normal University, where he also served as dean of the School of Arts and Media. In June 2020, he joined the Beijing Film Academy as vice president. In September 2023, he was elected as the seventh vice chairman of the China Television Artists Association.
