= Yan Xiaoming =

Chinese journalist

Yan Xiaoming (born August 1962, Chinese: 阎晓明), a native of Dingxiang, Shanxi, is a journalist from the People's Republic of China.

== Biography ==
In August 1983, he graduated from the Chinese Department of Shanxi University, majoring in library. He joined the Chinese Communist Party in February 1993. In December 2000, he was appointed deputy director of the People's Daily Beijing Press Station, and in October 2001, he was appointed director of the Beijing Press Station, and in June 2009, he was appointed director of the People's Daily Beijing branch. in August 2010, he was appointed secretary-general of the People's Daily and director of the Infrastructure Office, and in August 2011, he was appointed member of the Editorial Committee, secretary-general, and director of the Infrastructure Office of the People's Daily. In April 2014, he became deputy editor-in-chief and secretary-general of the People's Daily. in June 2015, he became director and editor-in-chief of the Central People's Broadcasting Station (CPB). In March 2018, he became deputy director of the China National Radio. In February 2023, he became vice-president of the China Federation of Radio and Television Associations (Chinese: 中国广播电视社会组织联合会). In September, he also became the chairman of the China Television Artists Association.
