= Ruan Ruolin =

Chinese writer and television producer

Ruan Ruolin (March 1, 1929 - March 19, 2010, Chinese: 阮若琳), was a native of Huai'an, Hebei, born in Beijing, and a Chinese television producer in the People's Republic of China. She was the director of Guangdong Television, deputy director of China Central Television, and vice-chairman of the China Television Artists Association.

== Biography ==
In 1943, Ruan went to the Jin-Cha-Ji Border Region to join the revolution from the Girls' High School of Beijing Normal University. in November 1943, she became the secretary of the Jin-Cha-Ji Border Region Senate. She graduated from the Shanxi-Gansu-Ningxia Border Region Teachers' Training School in Yan'an in 1944, and then worked at the Ganquan County of Yan'an in 1944. in 1945, she worked as a teacher in the middle school in Yan'an. After she got married on May 24, 1945, she was the publicity officer in the Political Department of the Hui People's Detachment of the First Brigade of Instruction. After the surrender of Japan, she went to Northeast China with the cadre group of the Hui Min Detachment (Chinese: 回民支队), and was appointed as the publicity officer of Kangping County Committee, the secretary of Kangping County Work Committee of five districts, the director of Women's Federation of Fakou County, the publicity officer of the First District Committee, the organizer of the "Popular Newspaper" (Chinese: 大众报), and the invited correspondent of the provincial newspaper of the CCP Liaojiao Provincial Committee, experiencing the guerrilla warfare in the frontline of the Chinese Communist Party and Kuomintang. In 1949, she worked in the Criminal Division of the Tianjin Municipal People's Court.

After the founding of the People's Republic of China, she served as director of the first division of the Rural Work Department of the CCP Jiangxi Provincial Committee, executive director of the Jiangxi Writers' Association, and then vice president of the Party School of the Guangzhou Municipal Party Committee. In 1959, she became the first secretary of the Guangzhou Municipal Committee of the Communist Youth League of China, and deputy editor-in-chief of the Guangzhou Daily, and in 1968, director of the Television Department of Guangdong Provincial Bureau of Broadcasting. In 1971, she became deputy director and secretary of the Party Committee of the Shaanxi Provincial Bureau of Broadcasting. In 1976, she became deputy director of China Radio International.

In 1978, she became the deputy director of China Central Television (CCTV), the party secretary and vice-chairman of the China Television Artists Association, etc. In 1979, she went to Japan for a study tour and introduced the animated film Astro Boyfrom Japan, and in 1983, she founded and served as the director of the China Television Drama Production Center, and the vice-director of the Artistic Committee of the China Television Arts Council (Chinese: 中国电视艺术委员会艺委会). She organized and participated in the production of more than 500 episodes of CCTV dramas such as Dream of the Red Chamber, Journey to the West, The Last Emperor, The Search for the Returned World, Song Qingling and Her Sisters, and The Ordinary World, as well as the large-scale documentaries Silk Road and The Yangtze River. She is also the editor-in-chief of China Television, Popular Television, Contemporary Television and other magazines and publications. She also hosted the 10th Sino-Japanese Television Exchange and retired in 1997, and died at the Air Force General Hospital in 2010.

== Family ==
Her father, Ruan Muhan, joined the CCP in 1931 and served as a member of the CPC's Northern Special Branch and secretary-general of the 8th Route Army's Jizhong Military Region Command. Her husband, Liu Shichang (Chinese: 刘世昌), a member of the Hui ethnic group, was a political commissar of the Hui People's Detachment of the Eighth Route Army and a major general of the People's Liberation Army Air Force.
