= Zhao Jing =

Zhao Jing may refer to:

- Zhao Jing (Tang dynasty) (736–796), Tang Dynasty chancellor
- Michael Anti (journalist) (born 1975), named Zhao Jing, Chinese journalist and political blogger
- Zhao Jing (runner) (born 1988), Chinese middle-distance runner
- Zhao Jing (swimmer) (born 1990), female Chinese swimmer

== See also ==
- Zhao Jin (disambiguation)
