= Fan Zongchai =

Chinese choreographer and director

Fan Zongchai (Chinese: 范宗钗) is a Chinese choreographer and director.

== Biography ==
In June 2004, he became the director of the chief editorial office of the Agricultural Film Center. He was the Art Director and Director of the General Editorial Office of the China Agricultural Film and Television Center (CCTV-7 Agricultural Programs). He participated in leading and organizing the Chinese TV Golden Eagle Award, Golden Eagle TV Art Festival, China Student TV Festival, Asian Micro Film Festival and other awards and festivals. In March 2013, he became a member of the sub-party group of the China Association of Television Artists (CATA), and deputy secretary-general. In September 2023, he was elected as the seventh vice-chairman of the China Association of Television Artists (CATA), as well as the secretary-general. In December, he was elected as the fourth president of the Academic Committee on Documentary of the China Association of Television Artists (CAATA).
