= Zhao Huayong =

Chinese politician

Zhao Huayong (Chinese: 赵化勇, born December 1948), male, native of Tongshan, Jiangsu Province, born in Tianchang, Anhui Province, is the former director of China Central Television (CCTV).

== Biography ==
Zhao Huayong graduated from Tianchang Middle School, joined the Chinese Communist Party in February 1972 when he was a teamster and teacher in the Leaping Society of Tianchang County, and then enrolled in the Fudan University and graduated from the Department of Journalism. After graduation, he joined the then Beijing Television, which was officially renamed CCTV in May 1978 with the approval of the Central Committee of the Chinese Communist Party. Zhao Huayong worked in the News Department, Special Features Department, Social Education Department, Economy Department, and Literature and Arts Center of the station. In 1989, Zhao Huayong came to preside over the Economy Department of CCTV and created hot programs such as "Economic Half Hour" and "Economic Information Broadcasting", which was praised by Deng Xiaoping. In February 1999, he became the director of the China Central Television. He was a deputy to the 10th National People's Congress, and in 2008, he was elected as a member of the Standing Committee of the 11th National Committee of the Chinese People's Political Consultative Conference (CPPCC).

On February 9, 2009, the State Council of the People's Republic of China recognized the fire at the CCTV Television and Cultural Center as a responsible accident, and Zhao Huayong was administratively demoted and given a serious warning within the CCP.

In December 2012, he became the fifth chairman of the China Television Artists Association.

Government offices
Preceded by Yang Weiguang	President of China Central Television; February 1999 – May 2009	Succeeded by Jiao Li
