= Hu Zhanfan =

Chinese journalist

Hu Zhanfan (born November 1953, Chinese: 胡占凡), a native of Mulan, Heilongjiang, is a media figure in the People's Republic of China and president of the China Television Artists Association.

== Biography ==
In June 1970, Hu Zhanfan worked as a reporter and announcer at the Mulan County Radio Station in Heilongjiang Province, joined the CCP in March 1976, and worked as an editor and reporter at Heilongjiang People's Broadcasting Station from 1976 to September 1983, and joined the Central People's Broadcasting Station (CPRS) in July 1987 as a reporter and director of the news center. In April 2001, he became deputy director of the State Administration of Radio, Film and Television (SARFT) and a member of the party group, and in March 2010, he became editor-in-chief of Guangming Daily.

In November 2011, he became a member of the party group of the State Administration of Radio, Film and Television (merged into the State Administration of Press, Publication, Radio, Film and Television in 2013) and president of China Central Television (CCTV). On April 7, 2015, he stepped down from the post of chairman due to his age. On September 22, 2017, he was elected as the sixth chairman of the China Association of Television Artists.

Government offices
| Preceded by Jiao Li | President of the China Central Television; November 2011 – April 2015 | Succeeded by Nie Chenxi |
