= 2010 Shanghai fire =

Fire in 2010 that destroyed a building in Shanghai

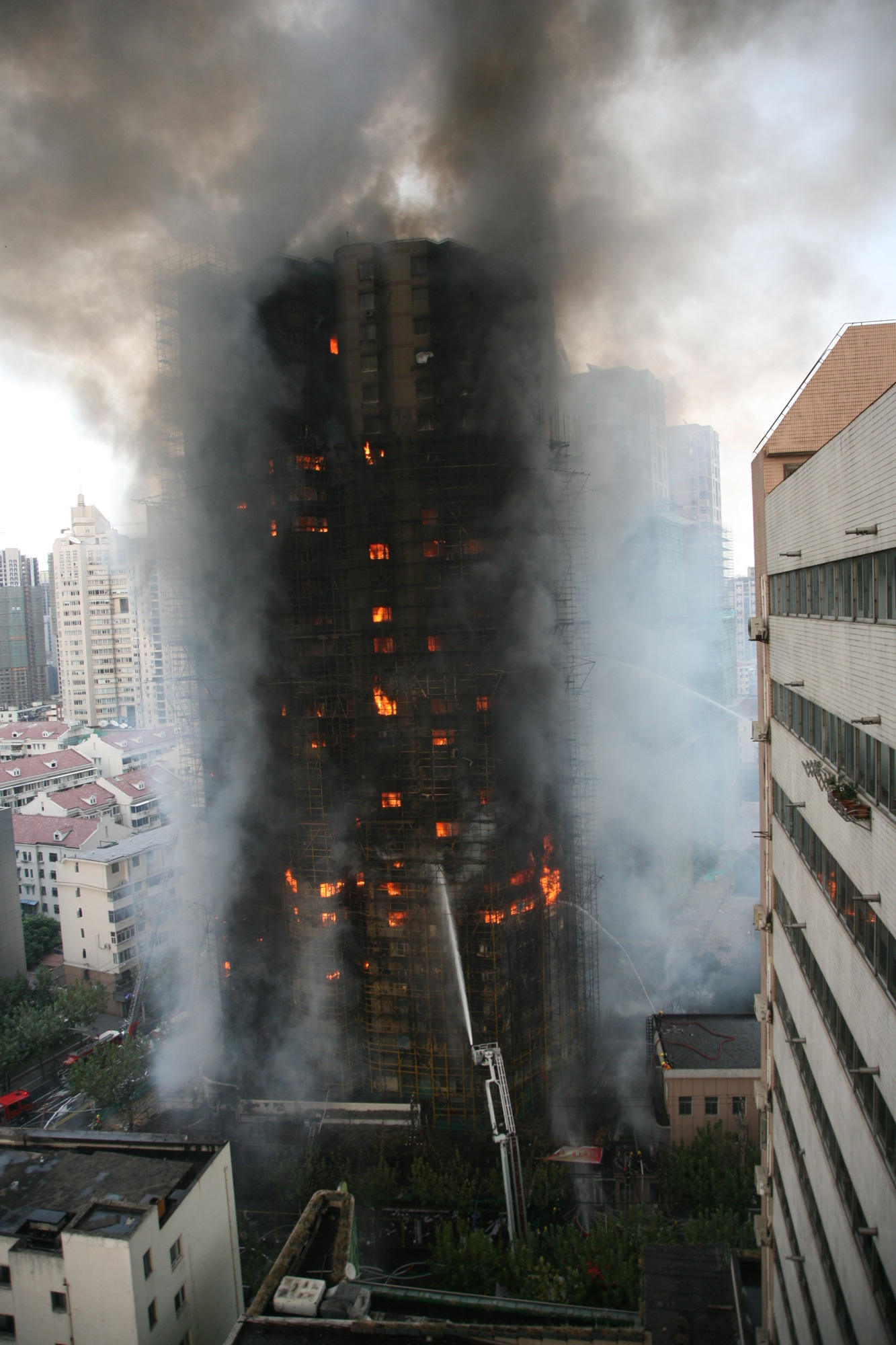
- Firefighters were unable to extinguish the fire from the ground.
- Date: 15 November 2010
- Time: 14:15 CST (06:15 UTC)
- Location: No. 1, Alley 718 Jiaozhou Road, Jing'an District, Shanghai, China; 31°14′15″N 121°26′06″E
- Also known as: Chinese: 上海“11·15”特别重大火灾; lit. 'Shanghai '11·15' especially serious fire'
- Deaths: 58 (36 missing)
- Injuries: 70–120

The 2010 Shanghai fire (Note: The PRC State Council officially named it "上海“11·15”特别重大火灾" (Shanghai "11·15" especially serious fire) or "上海市静安区胶州路公寓大楼“11·15”特别重大火灾事故" (Shanghai Jing'an District Jiaozhou Road "11·15" especially serious fire incident). "11·15" refers to 15 November. It is called also simply called "Great Fire of Jing'an District" and "Great Fire of Jiaozhou Road", "Shanghai high-rise fire" or "Shanghai apartment building fire" by Chinese media.) was a fire on 15 November 2010 that destroyed a 28-story high-rise apartment building in the heart of Shanghai, China, killing at least 58 people and injuring more than 70 others (with at least one source reporting more than 120 others injured). Most of the residents were retired state school senior educators. It is remembered as an iconic high-rise fire in China in the 2010s.

An investigation under the PRC State Council was announced on 16 November, the day after the fire, to determine the cause of the blaze. A preliminary finding by investigators concluded that sparks from welding work being done on the building, undertaken by unlicensed welders, ignited scaffolding around the structure, which led to the apartments' destruction. The municipal government also placed the blame on illegal multi-layered subcontracting, and detained four managers from several construction companies. In all, sixteen individuals have been arrested in connection to the fire, as well as four others accused of being unlicensed welders.

The week after the fire, city officials announced a compensation plan for victims of the fire and their families. The fire also prompted the government to pass stricter regulations on the construction industry, as well as increased fire safety inspections. The New York Times reported that China suppressed several building complaints, and several journalists were detained after the fire. The Asia Times wrote that an alleged slow response by the government was criticized.

== Fire ==
A video of the building on fire

The fire began at 14:15 local time (06:15 UTC) around the tenth floor. The building, constructed in 1997, was located at the intersection of Jiaozhou Road and Yuyao Road in Jing'an District, the heart of central Shanghai and was being renovated at the time of the fire. Witnesses said that the fire started with construction materials and spread throughout the building. It took over 80 fire engines and several hours to contain the fire. Shanghai residents were able to see smoke from the fire several kilometres away. Firefighters were unable to hose water on the top of the 85 metres (279 ft)-tall building from the ground. It is remembered as an iconic high-rise fire in China in the 2010s.

China Youth Daily reported that the contractor for the construction said the cause of the fire was probably sparks caused by welding work done on the 20th floor. Qiu Jingshu, a worker on the 18th floor, said sparks from welding being done on another building flew over and caused the scaffolding to catch fire. Afterward, it was "established" that the fire "was caused by unlicensed welders improperly operating their equipment", and several welders were arrested.

=== Rescue efforts ===
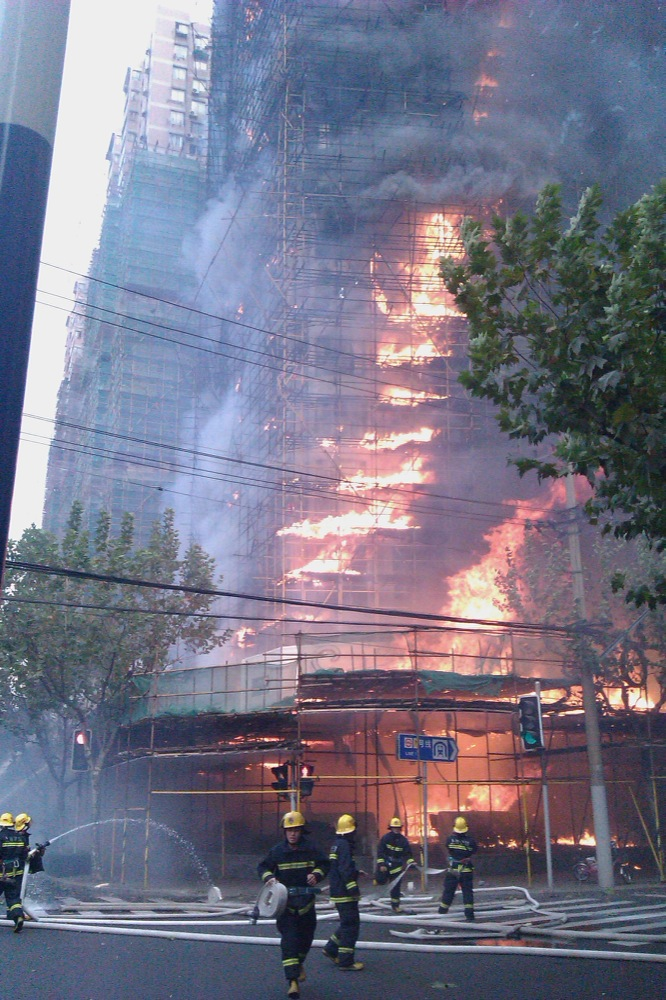
The apartment building on fire

Firefighters were able to save over 100 people out of the 180 families inhabiting the high-rise apartment building. According to Al Jazeera, the fire began at the scaffolding that surrounded the building, but spread to the complex's main building of around 500 apartments. Xinhua News Agency said the fire was contained at about 6:30 p.m. local time (10:30 UTC), more than four hours after it began.

Three helicopters had been called in to assist in the rescue, but were prevented by thick smoke generated by the fire. The upper portion of the building was beyond the reach of fire apparatus; the blaze was brought under control only after firefighters set up hoses atop a nearby building. In all, 25 fire stations and over 100 fire appliances were mobilised in response to the incident.

Television coverage of the event showed people holding on to scaffolding around the building, and some were able to climb down to safety. One worker on the 28th floor said that workers were adding insulation to the building when the fire broke out.

Victims not in hospitals, as well as evacuees from three surrounding city blocks, were sent to public buildings, including a school and a stadium, until their housing situation could be addressed.

== Casualties ==
The building housed around 440 people, mainly retired state school senior educators, including school principals, school party secretaries and high-ranked teachers. An early report showed that the ages of those injured in the fire range from 3 to 85, with the majority (64.5%) over the age of 50. Most of the injured appeared to be elderly residents or children, and it was confirmed that the youngest victim of the fire was 16 months old. A firefighter said that 57 of the 58 killed had died inside the building.

Earliest reports put the death toll at eight, but Xinhua later revised the count several times, and then confirmed 53 deaths by 16 November. 26 bodies were identified using DNA tests. Some media outlets reported 79 fatalities by adding the number of identified victims to the number of previously reported fatalities, although Xinhua later said that the 26 identified were included amongst the 53.

As of 24 November 58 people (22 males and 36 females) were officially reported dead while 56 people remained missing. Of the deceased, 57 were identified by DNA tests early on, while one male, from Japan, was still being identified when the official death count was released.

A doctor at Shanghai's Jing'an Hospital said that over 20 people injured in the fire had been admitted, many suffering from asphyxia caused by smoke inhalation. State media reports said the hospital was treating 55 survivors, including nine in serious condition. At least 70 people, and possibly more than 120 people were reported to have been injured. According to BBC News, people who survived the blaze were searching hospitals for missing family and friends. As of 24 November 66 wounded people, 14 of which were in critical condition, were being treated at seven area medical centers. In all, nine hospitals received victims of the fire.

The list of the dead was not released as the victims' families wanted privacy. Authorities said more than one-third of the families did not want the names of the deceased published. However, several newspapers listed some of the names of the dead. The artist Ai Weiwei compiled an unofficial list of the victims' names by contacting their relatives, along with officials and journalists. He claimed that the actual death toll was two more than the official count, but authorities did not provide access to the list of casualties.

== Response ==
=== Investigation ===
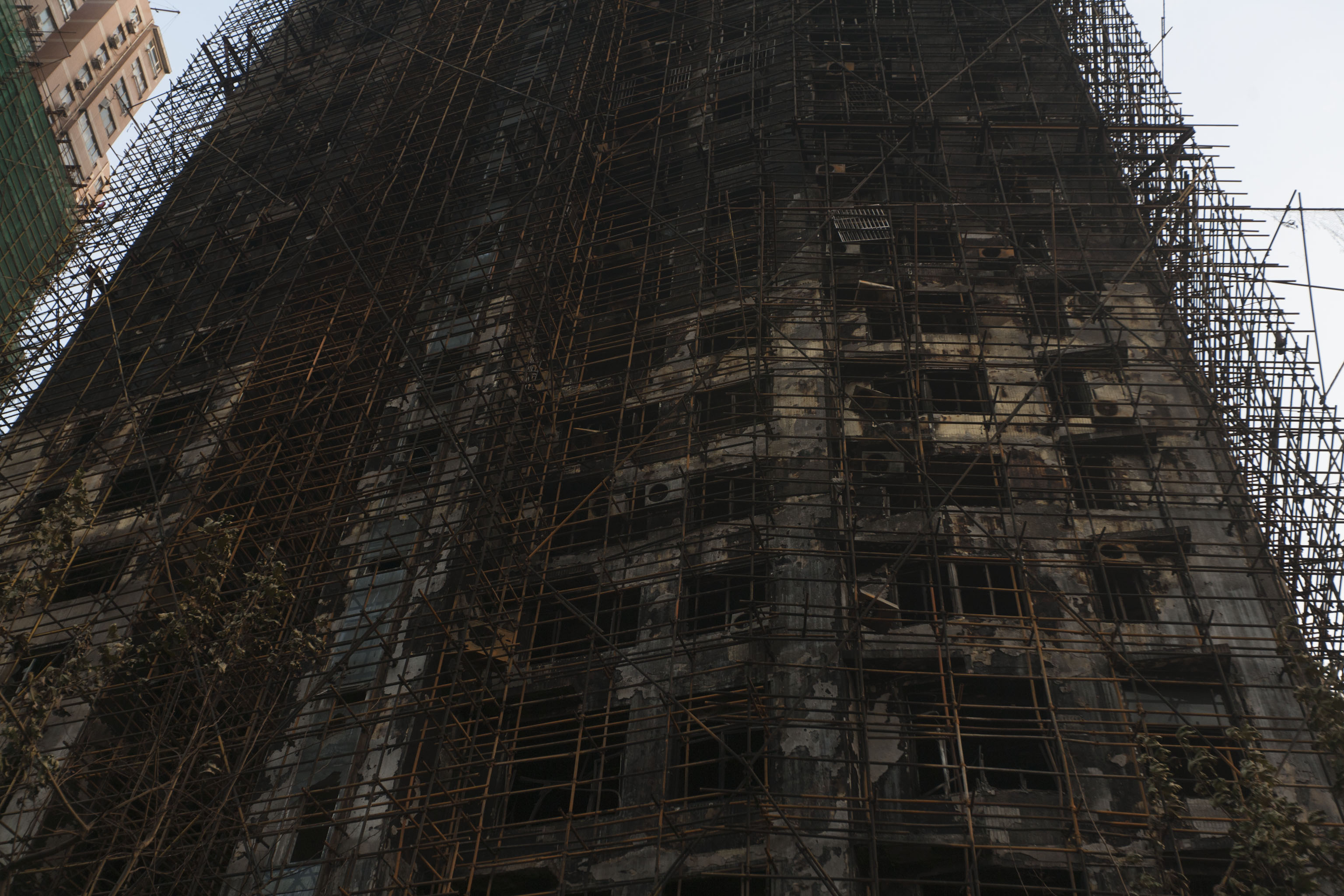
The structure after the fire was extinguished

Meng Jianzhu, the Minister of Public Security, went to Shanghai to manage rescue operations. Jing'an officials set up temporary lodging and food at area hotels, and some survivors stayed at a gymnasium overnight. After the flames were extinguished, the Shanghai Municipal Government held a press conference about the damage caused by the fire. Liu Jinguo, Vice Minister of Public Security, described the firefighting as "a successful model", leading to a dispute by Chinese netizens. Later in the week of the fire, government officials began a drive to increase fire and safety inspections at buildings and construction sites. They also said that improvements would be made to the city's firefighting capabilities.

Local residents said that fire safety requirements at the high-rise were lax, and that workers often tossed used cigarettes into the building's hallways. Week-long safety inspections were done on the two other buildings of the apartment complex, both of which were unharmed. The several hundred people living in those buildings were expected to be allowed to move back on 20 December 2010. Until then, the survivors would live in 17 nearby hotels.

According to Ming Pao, family members of the victims were dissatisfied with the official investigation and held a sit-in protest, calling for a fair judgement. Some locals blamed the official rescue work by comparing it with a large emergency response exercise on a 330-meter building several days before, and the successful firefighting for a blaze at Shanghai World Financial Center in 2007. Others blamed an ineffective firefighting system for the high death toll, and were dissatisfied that they were not given more details about the fire.

In Beijing, authorities halted renovation projects similar to the one being done on the apartment in Shanghai shortly after the blaze. The projects, intended to save energy by installing insulation, were stopped on 19 November, pending safety evaluations of the work. The insulation is still flammable, despite the use of fire retardants. Shanghai officials temporarily stopped such renovations after the fire, but later allowed them to resume.

On 20 December 2010, the mayor of Shanghai, Han Zheng, said that the city would crack down on unfair practices of construction companies and contracting firms. Han said that there is little regulation of the construction industry and that certain companies have had advantages over other companies when being awarded contracts. On 11 January 2011, Shanghai authorities placed into effect a new set of regulations aimed at better official supervision of construction companies. The city will also require that such companies will not be permitted to have any non-official relationship with local government offices after one year. Some media organizations had been questioning the connections between Jing'an District's government and the contracting groups involved in the fire, leading to accusations of corruption.

=== Compensation ===
On 23 November, it was announced that the families of each victim of the fire would receive 960,000 yuan in compensation for the ordeal. The compensation would include 650,000 yuan for every death and 310,000 yuan in financial assistance from the government and charities. Zhang Renliang, the top official of Jing'an District, said that Shanghai residents and foreign workers would be compensated equally. Survivors of the blaze would be fully compensated for the loss of possessions and property. Some who lost relatives in the disaster, however, were not satisfied with the announcement. They said that the compensation plan was not enough to pay for another apartment in the district, and that they would rather have a new apartment than the money.

=== Media censorship allegations ===
Hong Kong-based Sing Tao Daily and Singapore-based Lianhe Zaobao reported that four journalists from Xinjing News (新京报), China Daily, Reuters and a local newspaper were detained for one hour as security forces demanded a guarantee for positive news coverage by the journalists, before they were to interview families of the victims at a funeral parlour. The reporters wrote about their detainment on two websites.

A Chinese webmaster said that the authorities demanded for Chinese websites to cut down on their reporting of the fire, and only allowed usage of the official Xinhua news source. The New York Times reported that Chinese website Huasheng Online was blocked by government censors after criticizing the country's real-estate industry.

== Responsibility ==
Han Zheng said on 22 November that the city was largely responsible for the disaster. He said, "Poor supervision of the city's construction industry was one of the causes behind the high-rise apartment building fire. And we are responsible for that." Willy Wo-Lap Lam, a professor at the Chinese University of Hong Kong, said Han was trying "to do some damage control to dispel anger and to comfort the families of the victims and the Shanghai people." Luo Lin, chief of the PRC State Administration of Work Safety, blamed the fire on illegal employment methods, poor project oversight, and incompetent, inexperienced workers.

On the day following the fire, Meng Jianzhu said he wanted an investigation into the fire to determine who was responsible for it, so those at fault could be punished appropriately. He told rescue officials to be meticulous in their efforts and that information regarding the fire should be released to the public. He also asked local governments across China to take preventative measures against such fires, including building inspections. A team of investigators, led by the State Administration of Work Safety, was formed under the PRC State Council to look into the incident. Many details about the "November 15 Relief and Rehabilitation Working Team" have not been publicly announced.

The investigation into the fire made a preliminary conclusion that negligence by unlicensed welders on the tenth floor caused the bamboo scaffolding and attached nylon netting to catch fire, which subsequently spread to the entire structure. Shanghai authorities detained eight individuals on 16 November, at least four of whom were accused of being unlicensed welders. As of 19 November, a total of twelve individuals were being held by officials in connection to the blaze, including four more who were detained that day. The four were representatives of Jiayi Building Decoration, a part of renovation contractor Jing'an Construction, Shanghai Jing'an Construction Supervision, and the apartment management company.

On 24 December 2010, Shanghai officials announced that three government employees had been taken into custody in connection with the fire. Those detained were accused of abusing their authority to permit illicit construction practices to occur. The three were reported to be Gao Weizhong, director of Jing'an's construction and transportation commission; Zhang Quan, of the commission's main office; and Zhou Jianmin, of the organization's construction department.

=== Cause of fire ===
The fire may have been caused by the accidental ignition of polyurethane foam insulation used on the building's outer walls. In China, the foam is commonly used as insulation material without the addition of flame retardants, and the foam produces toxic gases such as hydrogen cyanide and carbon monoxide when burned. The Beijing Television Cultural Center was said to have used polyurethane insulation, which magnified the ferocity of a 2009 fire that consumed the center. In a 24 November press conference, local authorities said that the two apartments next to the destroyed building would be renovated as well, and that foam cladding on their exteriors would be switched out in favor of fire-resistant materials. Chinese citizens have also questioned the lack of an indoor fire sprinkler system in high rise buildings.

== Public mourning ==
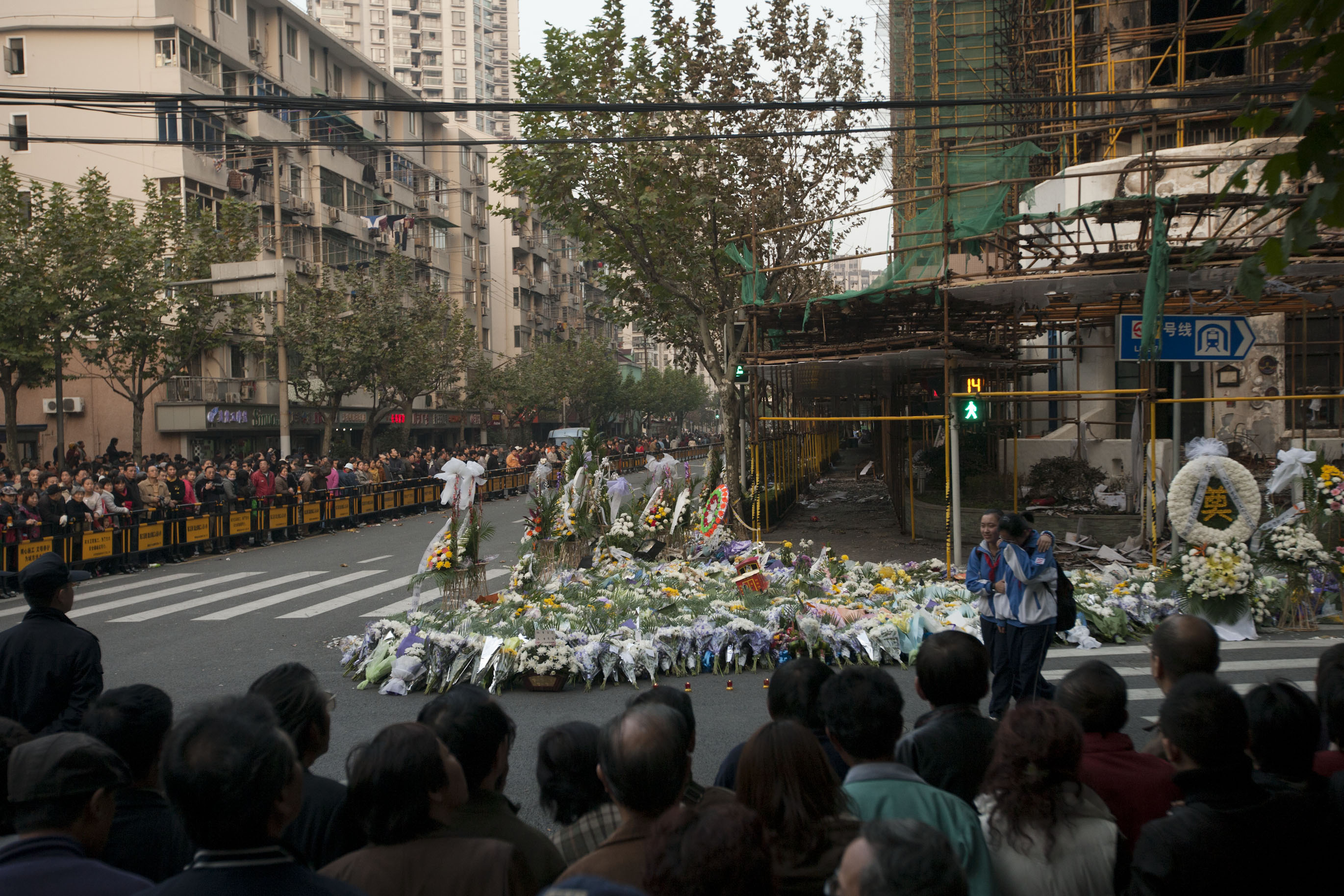
Mourners surrounded the destroyed building, bringing flowers and wreaths.

Local citizens put flowers and wreaths near the site, and offered prayers around the destroyed building. Mourners, including Government officials, came bearing chrysanthemums. At one point, the crowd stretched around 250 metres (820 ft) down the road.

According to Xinhua, about 10,000 people attended a public mourning at the site on 21 November, seven days after the fire; mourners left large amounts of flowers surrounding the burnt building. The seventh day after death is the day that Chinese people believe the souls of the dead return to their relatives before departing, and mourners at the site burned paper and made a feast for the deceased, in accordance with Chinese tradition. During the event, the Shanghai Symphony Orchestra played "Ave Maria" and monks recited sūtras at a local temple.

On 19 December 2010, the 35th day following the fire, authorities were reported to be detaining mourners who were visiting the site. According to Chinese legend, souls of the dead also visit humans 35 days after death, but police were taking mourners away on buses. Local officials did not provide an explanation for the event.

== See also ==
- List of fires in China
- Skyscraper fire
- Beijing Television Cultural Center fire
- 1996 Garley Building fire
- Daeyeonggak Hotel fire
- Grenfell Tower fire
- List of high-rise facade fires
