= Beijing Television Cultural Center fire =

2009 building fire in Beijing, China

Coordinates: 39°54′57″N 116°27′29″E

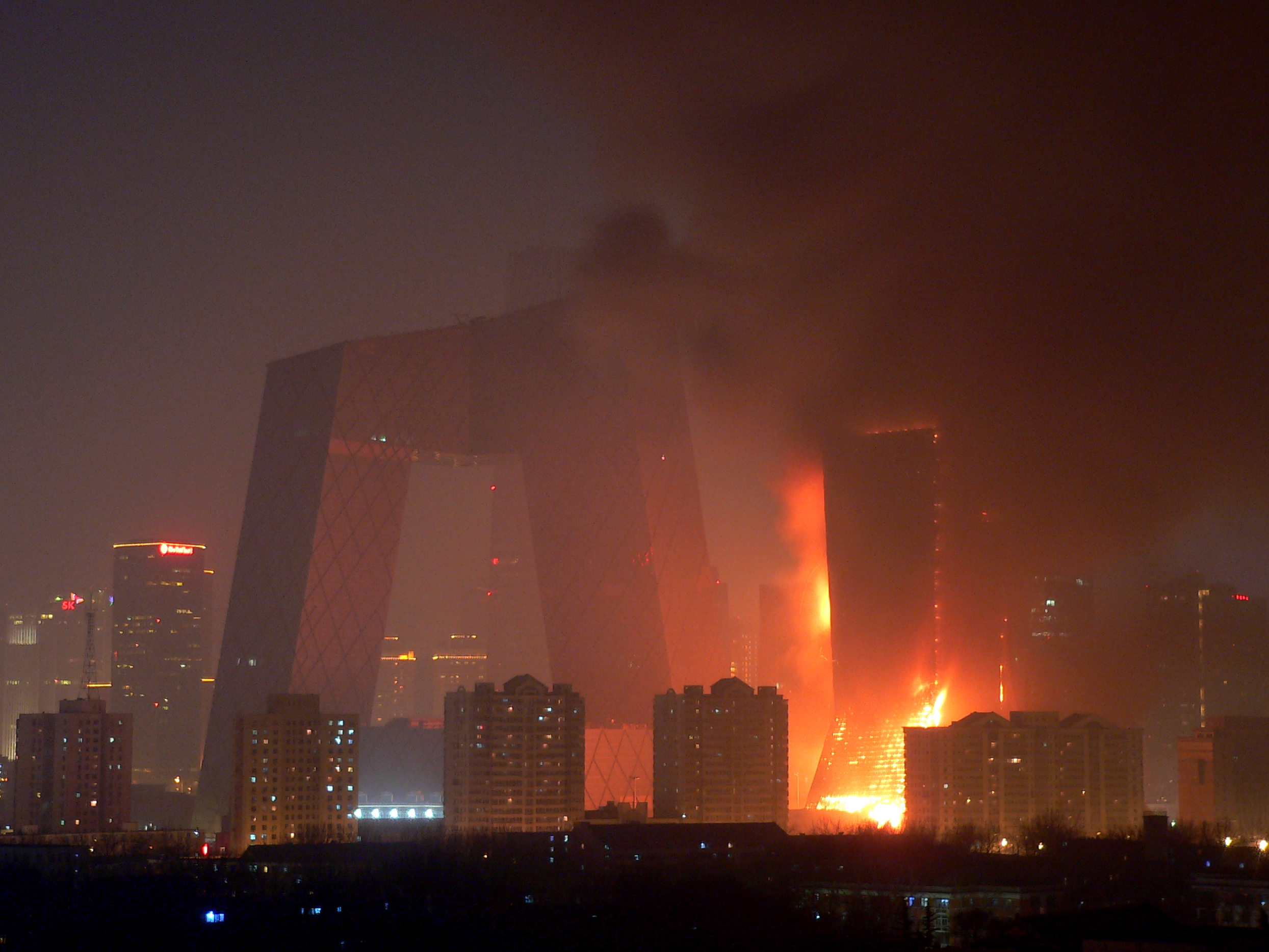
- The 44-story TVCC building in flames (right); the CCTV Headquarters (left)
- Date: 9 February 2009
- Time: 8:27 p.m.
- Location: Beijing
- Also known as: TVCC fire
- Participants: CCTV
- Outcome: Severely damaged by fire
- Deaths: 1
- Injuries: 7

The Beijing Television Cultural Center fire was an urban conflagration on 9 February 2009, in the Beijing central business district of Beijing, involving the uncompleted Beijing Television Cultural Center (TVCC) building. The building was adjacent to the CCTV Headquarters and owned by China Central Television (CCTV), and scheduled for completion in May 2009. The TVCC has been rebuilt and was opened in 2012.

At 8:27 p.m. on 9 February 2009, on the last day of the festivities marking Chinese New Year, the entire building caught fire due to a nearby unsanctioned fireworks display; it was put out six hours later.

The incident, and its coverage by Chinese state media, caused a furor in China. CCTV officials had carried out powerful pyrotechnics without the required permit from local government, and ignored repeated police warnings not to hold them. The authorities' attempts to censor news of the blaze were widely denounced by citizens as well as the international press.

== Background ==
China Central Television
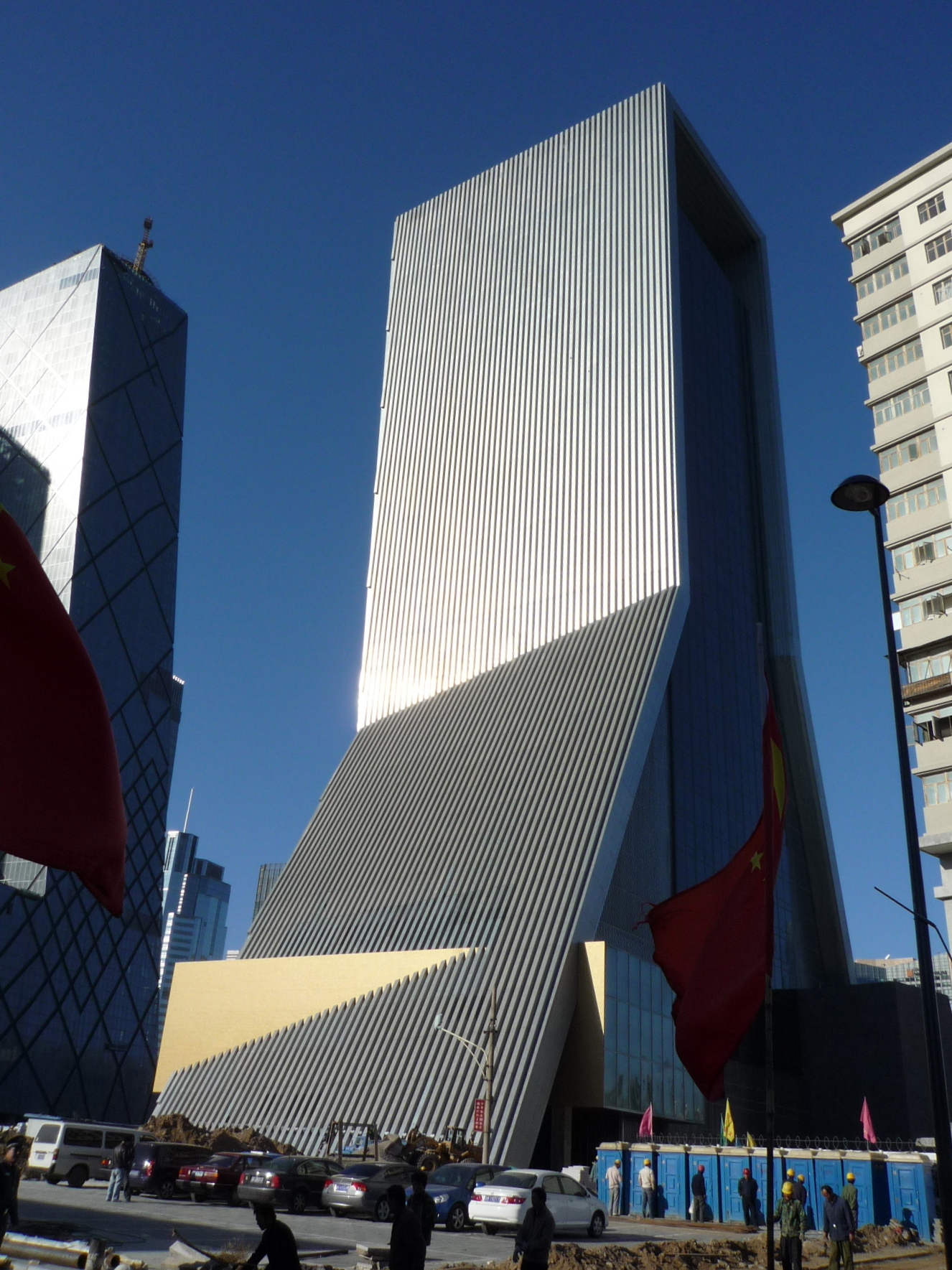
- The TVCC building before the fire
- Interactive map of the China Central Television area

General information
- Status: Complete repair works
- Location: East Third Ring Road No. 32, Beijing, Chaoyang
- Year built: 2005-2008
- Owner: China Central Television

Height
- Roof: 159 meters

Technical details
- Floor count: 33 floor
- Floor area: 110,000 square meters

Design and construction
- Architect: East China Architectural Design and Research Institute Co., Ltd.

Construction was started in 2004 and was expected to be completed in May 2009. The building was to be named "Television Cultural Center", TVCC, with the Beijing Mandarin Oriental being its main tenant.

Its nicknames include the Termite's Nest or the Boot because of its radical design. The building, along with the CCTV Headquarters Building, was built using far less steel than conventional skyscrapers, and designed to withstand major earthquakes. The radical structure gives the towers their form. In all, 140,000 tonnes of steel were used in its construction.

The construction budget of the building is said to be near US$730 million. The center would have included a television studio with seating for 1,500 audience members, recording studios, digital cinemas, news release facilities, and a 241-room five-star hotel to be operated by Mandarin Oriental. The total height of the 44-floor building was 159 metres (522 ft). The innovative, wedge-shaped building was designed by the Dutch architect Rem Koolhaas and his firm Office for Metropolitan Architecture. The engineering firm for the building was Arup, East Asia, who designed and built the TVCC after an extensive internal study of the collapse of the World Trade Center on 11 September 2001.

== Fire ==
The cause has been linked to a massive Chinese New Year fireworks display in the compound, authorized by CCTV itself, without the permission or participation from Beijing police, the Beijing Fire Department, Beijing City government, or any other governmental department. CCTV had ignored three consecutive police interventions and warnings and had four television cameras trained on the multi-million yuan fireworks, which consisted of nearly 700 high explosive pyrotechnic devices, reports said.

Six hundred firefighters arrived on the scene to fight the blaze, which lasted five hours and caused one death and seven injuries. Chinese media reported one firefighter – secretary of the fire department's branch of the Chinese Communist Party (CCP) – died from smoke inhalation and seven people were injured, six of them firefighters. The Chinese media proclaimed the dead firefighter a "revolutionary martyr"(革命烈士). Boxun estimated that the fire resulted in more than 4 billion yuan (US$588 million) in damages.

Xinhua News Agency reported, and the municipal public security bureau confirmed, that Beijing police detained an official of CCTV. Xu Wei (徐威), in charge of the CCTV construction site, was taken to a police station in eastern Beijing's central business district, suspected of being the organiser of the fireworks display. CCTV later made a public apology:

The fire caused serious damage to the state property, and CCTV is deeply remorseful. It also brought inconvenience to the people living nearby and caused traffic jams, and CCTV expresses sincere apologies.

=== Cause ===
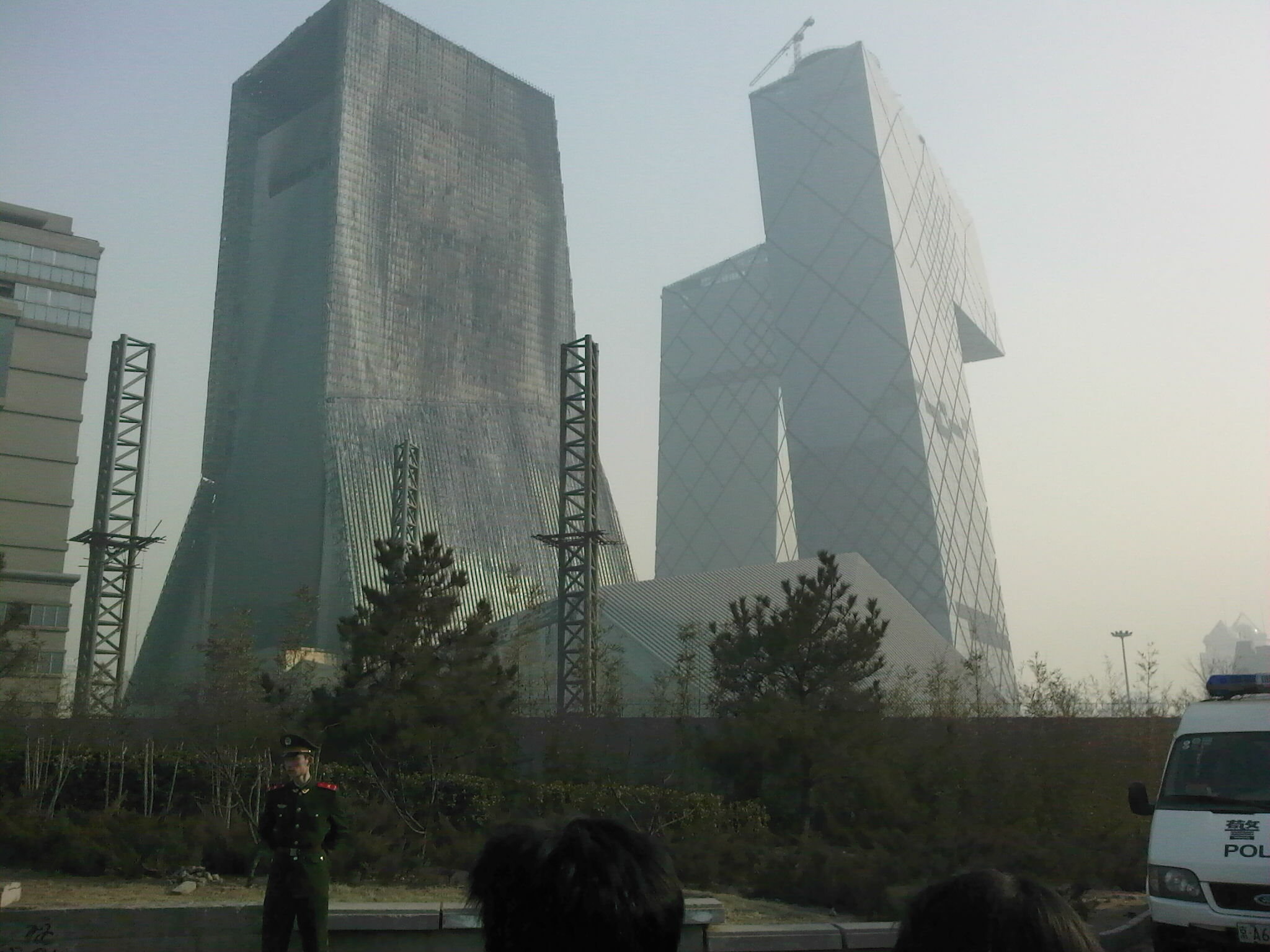
The TVCC building after the fire

The Beijing Municipal Fire Brigade confirmed that the cause of fire was the illegal use of highly explosive fireworks at the construction site. CCTV later apologized to the public for the inconvenience, mainly, the traffic re-direction they caused. The Fire Brigade said that the fire began on the building's roof and spread to the lower floors, fed by high winds. Toxic fumes and a lack of working sprinklers were said to have hampered efforts to extinguish the fire.

An amateur video that was uploaded on the Internet showed the fire starting after a shell from the fireworks landed on the roof of the uncompleted construction. One CNN report noted that "the top of the building was exploding". Another observed that the fire spread quickly and that the tower was completely engulfed in flames within less than 13 minutes. "It was obvious that there was a lot of debris on site, [which] ignited very quickly".

=== Investigation ===
Preliminary investigations, as reported on 14 February 2009, revealed that after the fire was started by the fireworks, the external wall insulation cladding continued to burn due to the material's susceptibility to catch fire. The material used was on the approved list of construction materials, and the city authorities had begun reevaluating the material for construction purposes. The investigation team observed that the fire damaged mainly the outer walls with majority of the interior and the structural integrity of the building largely unaffected.

No detailed damage estimate was released. The hotel is insured for US$220 million, with the actual amount of the payout to be decided after the police investigation ends. Immediately after the fire, seventeen people were detained, including the head of construction of the CCTV headquarters site, three additional CCTV staffers, the driver who transported the fireworks, four persons who helped guide the shipment to evade police checkpoints, and eight employees of the fireworks company who set off the display.

According to Caijing, the actual cost of the fireworks display was CNY350,000; however, CCTV was billed 1 million for it by a legal entity controlled by Xu Wei, the construction manager. Xu himself is alleged to have received a commission of CNY80,000.

State media announced in early February 2010 that 71 people were being held responsible for the building fire, including head of CCTV Zhao Huayong, who retired in May 2009; the State Council had evaluated direct economic losses at 163.83 million yuan (US$23.99 million). Of the 71 held responsible, 27 would not be prosecuted but would suffer party and administrative disciplinary measures. Zhao would receive an administrative demotion along with a severe warning from the CCP. In late February, AFP cited an official in Beijing Number Two Intermediate Court who confirmed 23 people have been charged in the incident. Xu Wei is among those due to be tried, according to state media.

=== Censorship ===
A memo from government officials, which was posted on the Internet, made clear that authorities were eager to downplay the blaze, "a colossal embarrassment that many people believe augurs poorly for the new year", according to The New York Times. The leaked memo read: "No photos, no video clips, no in-depth reports," and further, "The news should be put on news areas only and the comments posting areas should be closed".

No images of the blaze or the building were broadcast on state television, and the Xinhua website sidelined the story. CCTV later reported the news with a video on its website after the fire.

Li Xiguang, journalism professor at Beijing's Tsinghua University said the decision not to show coverage was "stupid" and damaged the credibility of CCTV.

== Aftermath ==
=== Internet users in China ===
Despite the lack of images on the state media, photographs and videotapes of the fire, taken with cameras and cellphones, swiftly found their way to blogs and forums including major portals such as Sina, Sohu, and Youku.

Media reported that Chinese citizens on the internet were taking sarcastic and comical pot-shots at CCTV. It noted there was "a storm" of criticism that the state broadcaster which created one of the year's biggest news stories failed to report the event promptly, or honestly. Parodies of the incident were also rampant, including edited images often relating to other Chinese internet memes, such as the Grass Mud Horse.

=== Rebuilding ===
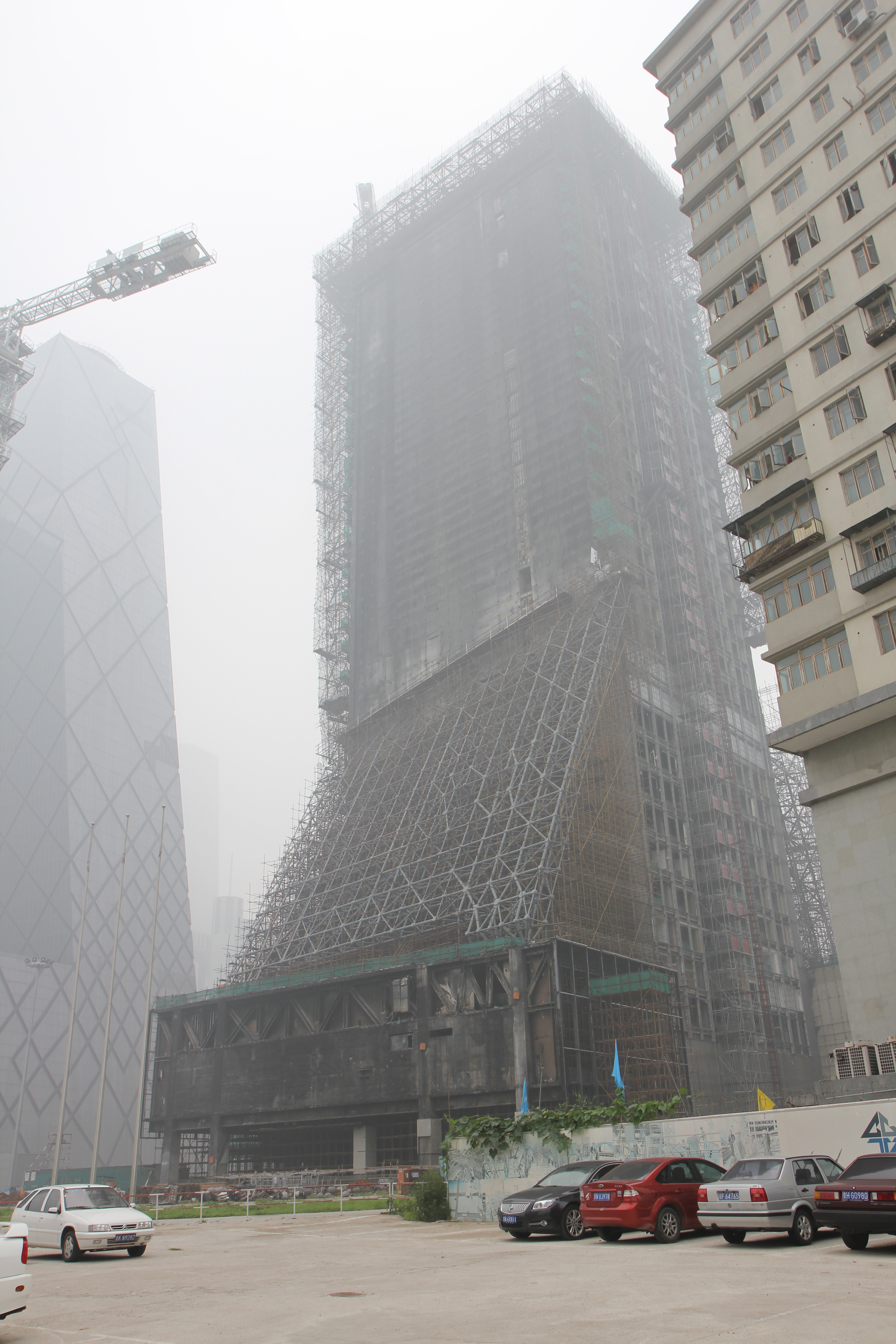
The Beijing Television Cultural Center as seen in July 2011. Construction had resumed after the fire.

The damaged external wall insulation cladding was removed after the investigations were completed, and replaced in a span of 2 years. The replacement work was completed in November 2012. The complete repair works, including the electrical and interior design, was estimated to be completed in 2013.

== See also ==
- 2010 Shanghai fire
- Skyscraper fire
