= Hua Xuanfei =

Chinese news reporter

Hua Xuanfei (born February 1971; Chinese: 华宣飞) is a native of Ninghai, Zhejiang Province, and a news personality in the People's Republic of China.

== Biography ==
Hua Xuanfei graduated from the School of Journalism of Renmin University of China and joined the work in August 1994. He worked into the Zhejiang Daily engaged in news gathering and editing work, and joined the Chinese Communist Party in December 2000. In June 2012, he became the deputy director of Zhejiang Provincial Radio, Film and Television bureau. In April 2017, he became the deputy editor-in-chief. In May 2019, he was managed as the editor-in-chief of Zhejiang Broadcasting and Television Group.

On 2022 September 18, the Zhejiang Provincial People's Government decided that Hua became the president of Zhejiang Radio and Television Group. In September 2023, he was appointed as the vice chairman of the China Television Artists Association.
