= Yu Junsheng =

Yu Junsheng (born August 1968, Chinese: 余俊生) is a political figure in the People's Republic of China. He is a native of Linzhou, Henan Province.

== Biography ==
Yu graduated from China University of Political Science and Law. In November 1991, he joined the Chinese Communist Party (CCP). In September 2011, he was appointed as a member of the Standing Committee of the CCP Committee of Changping District, Beijing, and minister of publicity In April 2016, he was appointed as vice minister of the Publicity Department of the Beijing Municipal Committee of the CCP. In March 2018, he was appointed as deputy secretary general of the Beijing Municipal Party Committee. In March 2020, he became CCP Committee Secretary and CEO of Beijing Radio and Television Station. In September 2023, he was appointed as the vice chairman of the China Television Artists Association.
