= Liaoning Daily =

Chinese Communist Party newspaper

- Native name: 辽宁日报
- Type: Daily newspaper
- Format: Print, online
- Owner: Liaoning Provincial Committee of the Chinese Communist Party
- Publisher: Liaoning Daily Newspaper Group
- Founded: September 1, 1954
- Language: Chinese
- Website: www.lnd.com.cn

Liaoning Daily (traditional Chinese: 遼寧日報; simplified Chinese: 辽宁日报; pinyin: Liáoníng rìbào) is the official newspaper of the Liaoning Provincial Committee of the Chinese Communist Party, published since September 1, 1954 by the Liaoning Daily Newspaper Group. The paper's predecessor was the Northeast Daily, which was the organ of the Northeast Bureau of the CCP Central Committee.

== History ==
On November 1, 1945, the Chinese Communist Party founded the Northeast Daily in Northeast China, which is today's Liaoning Daily, and on August 31, 1954, the Greater Administrative Area of Northeast was abolished, and the publication of the Northeast Daily was officially suspended. On September 1, 1954, Liaoning Daily was officially launched.

In March 2018, Liaoning Daily won the Third National Top 100 Newspapers in China.

== Sister publications and website ==
The paper's publisher also operate lnd.com.cn and publish Liaoshen Evening News (辽沈晚报), Peninsula Morning Paper (半岛晨报) and Northern Morning Post (北方晨报).
