= Huang Huiqun =

Chinese television executive (1931–2025)

Huang Huiqun (Chinese: 黄惠群, July 1931 – 18 November 2025) was a Chinese television executive. A native of Hangzhou, Zhejiang Province, she was president of China Central Television (CCTV).

== Life and career ==
In 1937, when the Second Sino-Japanese War broke out, seven-year-old Huang Huiqun fled with her parents to Chongqing, Sichuan Province. In 1944, Huang Huiqun was admitted to the Middle School attached to the National Institute of Social Education (Chinese: 国立社会教育学院) in Qingmuguan, Baxian County, Sichuan Province, where he attended junior high school. After the victory in the Anti-Japanese War, the high school was moved to Danyang, Jiangsu Province, where she graduated from junior high school and was promoted to senior high school, and in May 1949 she joined the army, where she studied Russian at the East China University of Military Science and Politics, the Russian College of the Political Department of the Third Field Army of the People's Liberation Army, and the Russian College of Shanghai. After graduation, she was assigned to work as an interpreter for the Central Broadcasting Bureau (Chinese: 中央广播事业局) in Beijing. In August 1959, she was transferred to the Foreign Language Department of the Beijing Broadcasting Institute, where she served as secretary, team leader, and deputy head of the department, and was also transferred as an interpreter for the Chinese Embassy in Albania.

In June 1984, Huang Huiqun was transferred to the Central Radio and Television Administration (CRTA) as deputy director of the Cadre Department, and in July 1985, she was transferred to the position of Deputy Chairman of China Central Television (CCTV), where she served as the chairman of the station from 1988 to 1991, and after January 1992, she was appointed as the chairman of the Board of Directors of CCTV's Media Center, and General Manager of the China Tower Limited Liability Corporation (CTCL). She also served as vice president of the China Radio and Television Society (Chinese: 中国广播电视学会), a member of the All-China Women's Federation, and a director of the China Disabled Persons' Welfare Foundation (Chinese: 中国残疾人福利基金会).

Huang died in Beijing on 18 November 2025, at the age of 94.
