= Jin Zhao (journalist) =

Chinese journalist

Jin Zhao (September 19, 1919 - October 16, 2005, Chinese: 金照), formerly known as Jin Qiming (Chinese: 金启明) and Jin Yongkang (Chinese: 金永康), was a Chinese journalist and a president of the China Television Artists Association.

== Biography ==
He founded the Rear Public (Chinese: 后方民众) in 1937. From March 1938 to May 1939, he participated in the Sacrifice for National Salvation League (Chinese: 牺牲救国同盟会 and the People's Youth. After March 1940, he served as the editor, deputy editor-in-chief, and deputy editor-in-chief of the Border Region People's Newspaper (Chinese: 边区群众报). He joined the Chinese Communist Party in November 1941, and during this period, he wrote the book How to Write Newsletters.

After the founding of the People's Republic of China, he served as the director of the Northwest People's Radio, the director of the Press and Publication Bureau of the Northwest Administrative Committee, and a member of the Northwest Culture and Education Committee. He was transferred to the Central Broadcasting Bureau as the deputy director in October 1954, and successively served as the chief editorial office of the Bureau, the director of the Foreign Broadcasting Department, and the director of the China Radio International. He was persecuted during the Cultural Revolution and was later rehabilitated.

After May 1982, he became the advisor of the Ministry of Radio and Television, the chairman of China Television Artists Association, the vice president of China Radio and Television Society, and the advisor of China Radio and Television Yearbook. He died on October 16, 2005, in Beijing at age 90.
