= Jin Zhao (director) =

Jin Zhao (1928 - April 27, 2013, Chinese: 金钊), a native of Jianhu County, Jiangsu Province, was a television director of the People's Republic of China.

== Biography ==
In October 1944, he joined the revolutionary work and in July 1947, he joined the Chinese Communist Party. He was the party secretary and director of the Radio and Television Department of Shandong Province, and retired in March 1993. He died in Jinan on April 27, 2013, at the age of 85 years.
