= Liao Xiangzhong =

- 廖祥忠

President of Communication University of China
- Incumbent
- Assumed office March 2018
- Preceded by: Hu Zhengrong (胡正荣)

Personal details
- Born: December 1968 (age 57) Jiujiang, Jiangxi, China
- Party: Chinese Communist Party
- Education: Communication University of China
- Occupation: Educator

Liao Xiangzhong (Chinese: 廖祥忠; pinyin: Liào Xiángzhōng; born December 1968) is a Chinese animation and digital art expert who has served as president of the Communication University of China (CUC) since March 2018. He was Vice President of CUC from November 2010 to March 2018. He is a PhD advisor and professor of Digital Media Art at CUC.

== Life and career ==
Liao was born and grew up in Jiujiang, Jiangxi province. He entered the Communication University of China (CUC) in September 1986, majoring in radio technology, and graduated in July 1990. He Joined the CUC faculty in 1990 and received a PhD in 2005 from the university.

Liao served as the Deputy Chair of Radio Engineering between 1994 and 1995, and Deputy Dean of the School of Information Engineering between 1995 and 2005. While he was the Dean of the School of Animation and Digital Arts between 2005 and 2012, he founded the first Digital Media Art program in China. He was promoted to the Vice President of CUC in 2010.

He is a well-known expert of Digital Media Art and Animation, wrote and published multiple papers and books in those areas. With his leadership, Communication University of China has been the top Chinese university in the area of digital media art and animation. As deputy director and Secretary General of the Animation and Digital Media Teaching Guidance Committee under the Ministry of Education, Liao was the key contributor of the Ministry of Education Teaching Quality Standard for Animation and Digital Media in Higher Education (Chinese: 教育部高等学校动画、数字媒体教学质量国家标准).

Liao is member of the National Strategic New Industry Consultant Experts Committee (国家战略性新兴产业专家咨询委员会), Deputy Director and Secretary General of the Animation and Digital Media Teaching Guidance Committee under the Ministry of Education (教育部动画、数字媒体教学指导委员会), member of the Art Education Committee under the Ministry of Education, Vice President of the China Animation Association (中国动画学会), Deputy Director of the editorial board of Modern Cinema (当代电影). Liao is selected in the New Century Outstanding Talent Support Project (新世纪优秀人才支持计划).

Liao founded the Aniwow! China (Beijing) International Student Animation Festival.

== Awards ==
- 1st prize of the Science Research projects of the State Administration of Film, Radio and Television, 2007
- 1st prize of Academic Writings of the China Association of Radio and Television (Chinese: 中国广播电视学会), 2007
- 1st prize of the 10th Beijing Outstanding Research Projects of Philosophy and Social Science, 2007
- 1st prize of the 5th National Best Academic Writings in Radio and Television, 2007
- 1st prize of Beijing Outstanding Achievement of Education and Teaching, 2012
- Selected as the Four Kinds of First Batch Talents of Beijing Publicity Department (Chinese: 北京市委宣传部“四个一批”人才)
- Selected as the New Century Outstanding Talent Support Project (Chinese: 新世纪优秀人才支持计划) of Ministry of Education
