= Jin Zhao (physicist) =

Chinese physicist

Jin Zhao (Chinese: 赵瑾) is a Chinese computational condensed-matter physicist, whose research involves using density functional theory in ab initio calculations of excited carriers and excitons in molecular dynamics, including work on perovskites, graphene, and fullerenes. She is a professor of physics in the Hefei National Laboratory for Physical Sciences at Microscale at the University of Science and Technology of China.

== Education and career ==
Zhao was an undergraduate at the University of Science and Technology of China, where she graduated in 1998 with a bachelor's degree in physics. She continued at the university for a Ph.D. in physics in 2003.

After postdoctoral research at the University of Pittsburgh, she became a research assistant professor in the University of Pittsburgh Department of Physics and Astronomy in 2008. In 2010 she returned to the University of Science and Technology of China, taking her present position as a professor there.

== Recognition ==
Zhao won a 2005 best doctoral dissertation award of the Chinese Academy of Sciences. In 2007 she received the M.T. Thomas Award for Outstanding Postdoctoral Achievement of the Pacific Northwest National Laboratory, recoignizing her "seminal contributions to the theory of the unoccupied electronic structure and dynamics of solid adsorbate interfaces, which are of importance to geochemistry, atmospheric science, and energy-related interfacial phenomena". She was the first researcher outside the laboratory to receive the award.

She was named to the Chinese One Hundred Talented Program in 2010. She received the Excellent Young Scientist Award in 2013, Outstanding Scientific Achievement Award in 2015, Outstanding Young Scientist Award in 2021, and Chinese Young Women in Science Award in 2023.

In 2023, she was named a Fellow of the American Physical Society (APS), after a nomination from the APS Division of Computational Physics, "for combining methods of many-body perturbation theory with molecular dynamics to model the coupled ultrafast time scale charge, spin, and lattice quantum interactions in condensed matter and quantum materials within the shared Hefei-nonadiabatic molecular dynamics code".
