= China Television Artists Association =

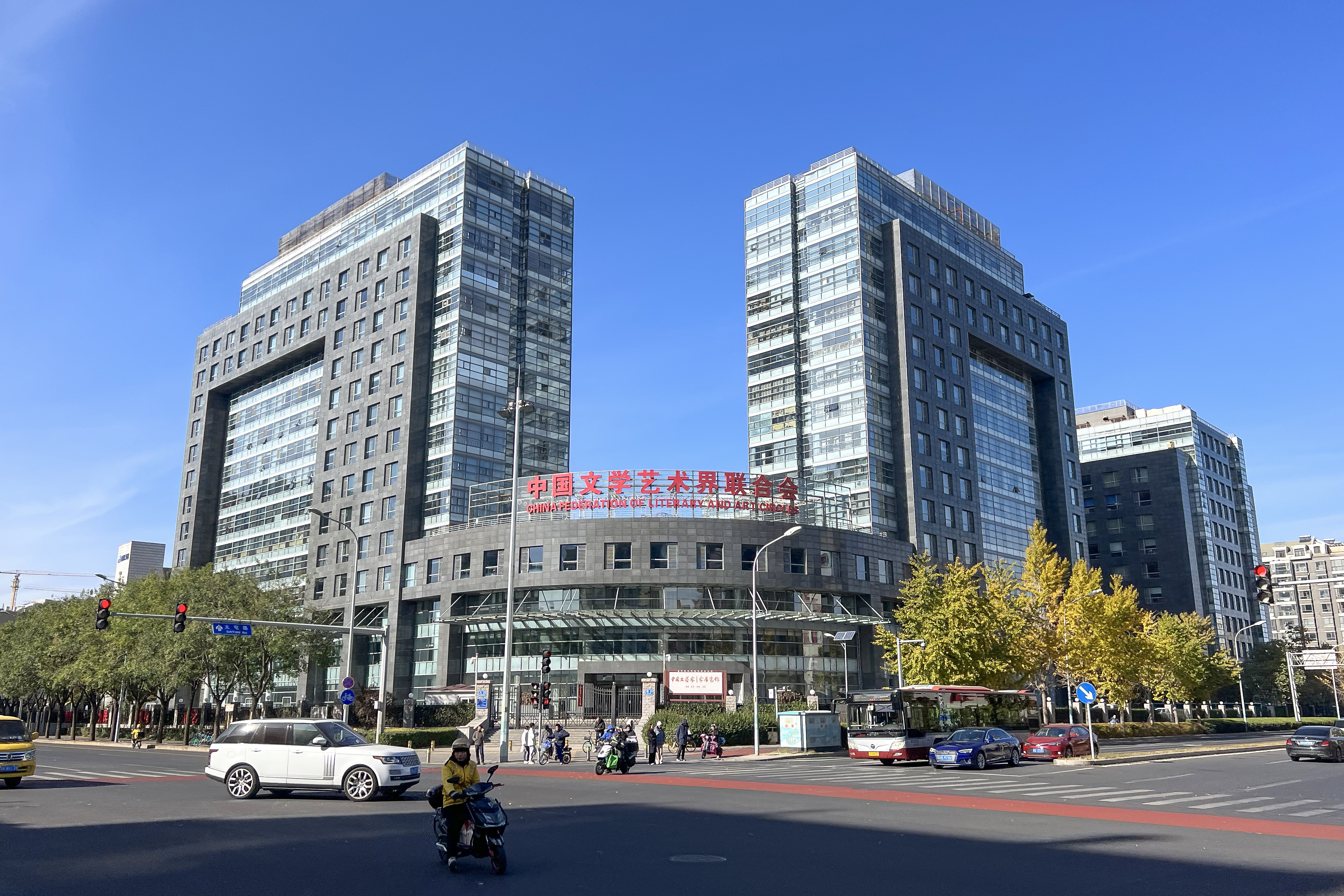
- Traditional Chinese: 中國電視藝術家協會
- Simplified Chinese: 中国电视艺术家协会
Transcriptions
Standard Mandarin
- Hanyu Pinyin: Zhōngguó Diànshì Yìshùjiā Xiéhuì

China Television Artists Association, (Chinese: 中国电视艺术家协会) aka China TV Artists Association, or CTAA, is a subordinate of the China Federation of Literary and Art Circles (CFLAC). It was founded in May 1985. It has more than 6,000 registered members, with branch associations across China.

== Major officials ==
=== the 7th Presidium ===
- Chairman: Yan Xiaoming
- Vice-Chairmen: Wang Liping, Hua Xuanfei, Liu Jiang, Yu Junsheng, Zhang Huali, Fan Zongchai, Lin Yongjian, Hu Zhifeng, Hou Hongliang, Gong Yu, Kang Hui, Ge Lei, Liao Xiangzhong

=== the 6th Presidium ===
- Chairman: Zhao Huayong
- Vice-Chairman: Wan Ke, Ma Weigan, Li Xingguo, Li Jingsheng, Zhang Xian, Chen Hua, Ouyang Changlin, Zhou Li, Zhao Duojia, Hu Mei, Hu En, Tang Guoqiang, Cheng Weidong, Qiu Xin
- Secretary-General: Zhang Xian
- Deputy Secretary-General: Zhang Yanmin

== List of chairmen ==
No.	Portrait	Name	Took office	Left office	Ref
1		Jin Zhao	April 1985	November 1996	
2		Yang Weiguang	November 1996	December 2002	
3		Yang Weiguang	December 2002	December 2007	
4		Zhao Huayong	December 2007	December 2012	
5		Zhao Huayong	December 2012	September 2017	
6		Hu Zhanfan	September 2017	September 2023	
7		Yan Xiaoming	September 2023	Incumbent	

== Award ==
- China TV Golden Eagle Award, established in 1983. The award is presented by the China Television Artists Association.
- The Actors of China Awards, established in 2014. The award is presented by the China Television Artists Association.

== Academic journal ==
Current TV (《当代电视》) was its official journal.
