= List of tourist attractions in Shanghai =

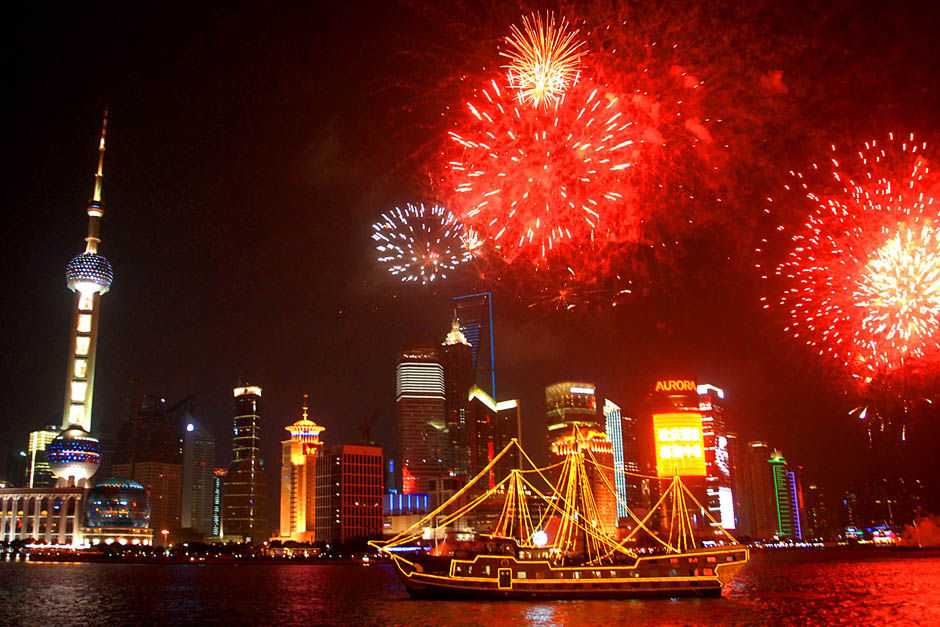
Pudong.

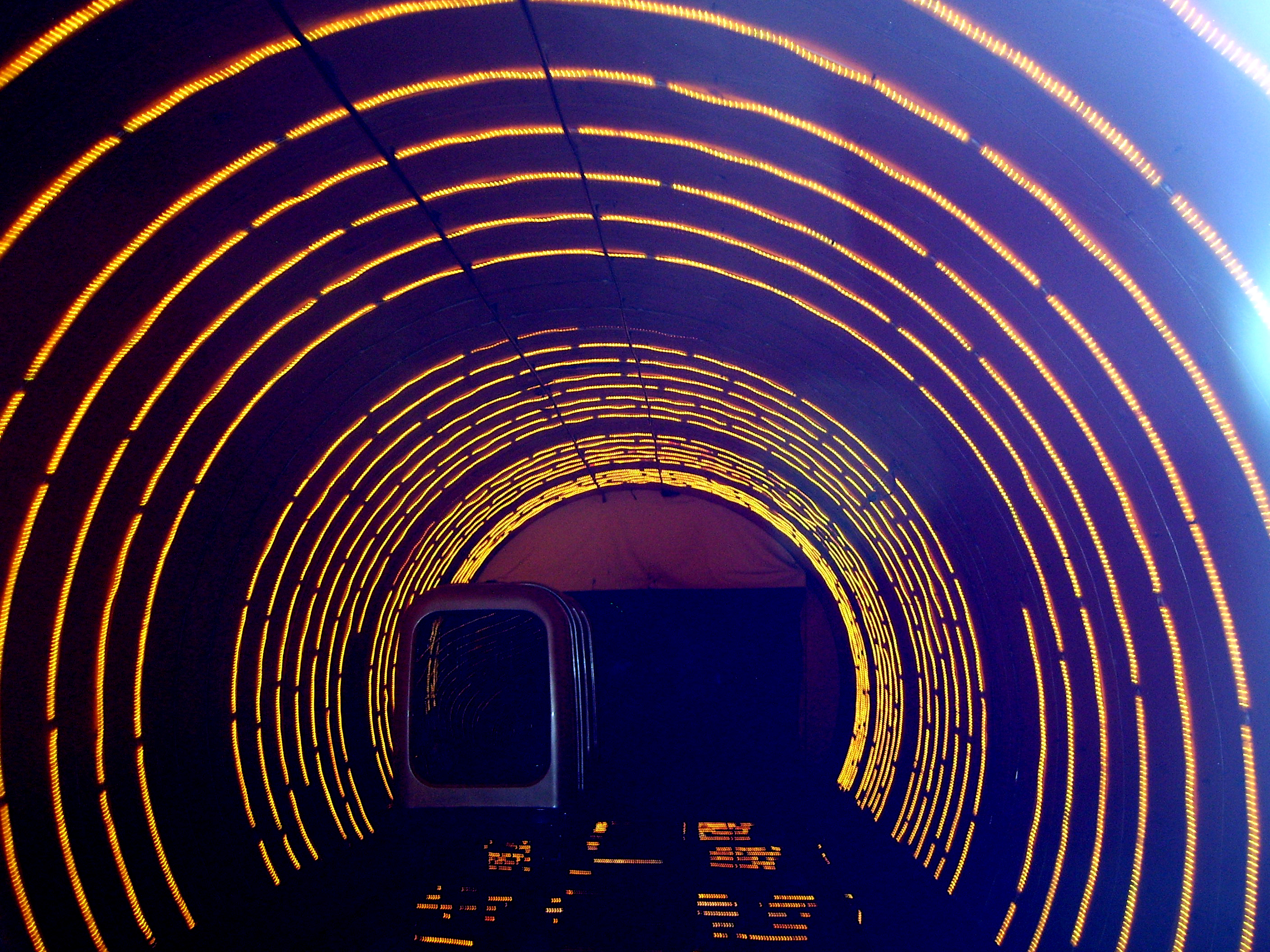
Light effects in The Bund sightseeing tunnel.

Attractions in Shanghai, China, include:

- The Bund
- Bund Sightseeing Tunnel
- City God Temple
- Consulate-General of Russia in Shanghai
- Expo 2010
- Fotografiska Shanghai
- General Post Office Building
- Happy Valley Shanghai
- Jade Buddha Temple
- Jin Mao Tower
- Jing'an Temple
- Jinjiang Action Park
- Longhua Temple
- Nanjing Road
- Oriental Pearl Tower
- People's Park
- People's Square
- Pudong
- Qibao
- St. Ignatius Cathedral of Shanghai
- Shanghai Disney Resort
- Shanghai French Concession
- Shanghai Grand Theatre
- Shanghai International Circuit
- Shanghai Ocean Aquarium
- Shanghai Oriental Arts Center
- Shanghai Tower
- Shanghai Urban Planning Exhibition Center
- Shanghai World Financial Center
- Shanghai Zoo
- She Shan Basilica
- Taikang Lu
- Thames Town
- Wen Miao
- Xintiandi
- Yuyuan Garden
- Yuyuan Tourist Mart
- Tianzifang

== Museums ==
- C. Y. Tung Maritime Museum
- China Art Museum
- Madame Tussauds Shanghai
- Museum of Contemporary Art Shanghai
- Shanghai Art Museum
- Shanghai Auto Museum
- Shanghai Museum
- Shanghai Natural History Museum
- Shanghai Science and Technology Museum
- Song Ching Ling Memorial Residence in Shanghai
- Shanghai Jewish Refugees Museum
- Shanghai Metro Museum

== Parks and gardens ==
- Century Park
- Changfeng Park
- Dongping National Forest Park
- Guyi Garden (Jiading)
- Huangpu Park
- Lu Xun Park
- Oriental Land (Qingpu)
- People's Park
- People's Square
- Yuyuan Garden
- Zhongshan Park
