= Museum of Contemporary Art Shanghai =

Art museum in Shanghai, China

- 上海当代艺术馆
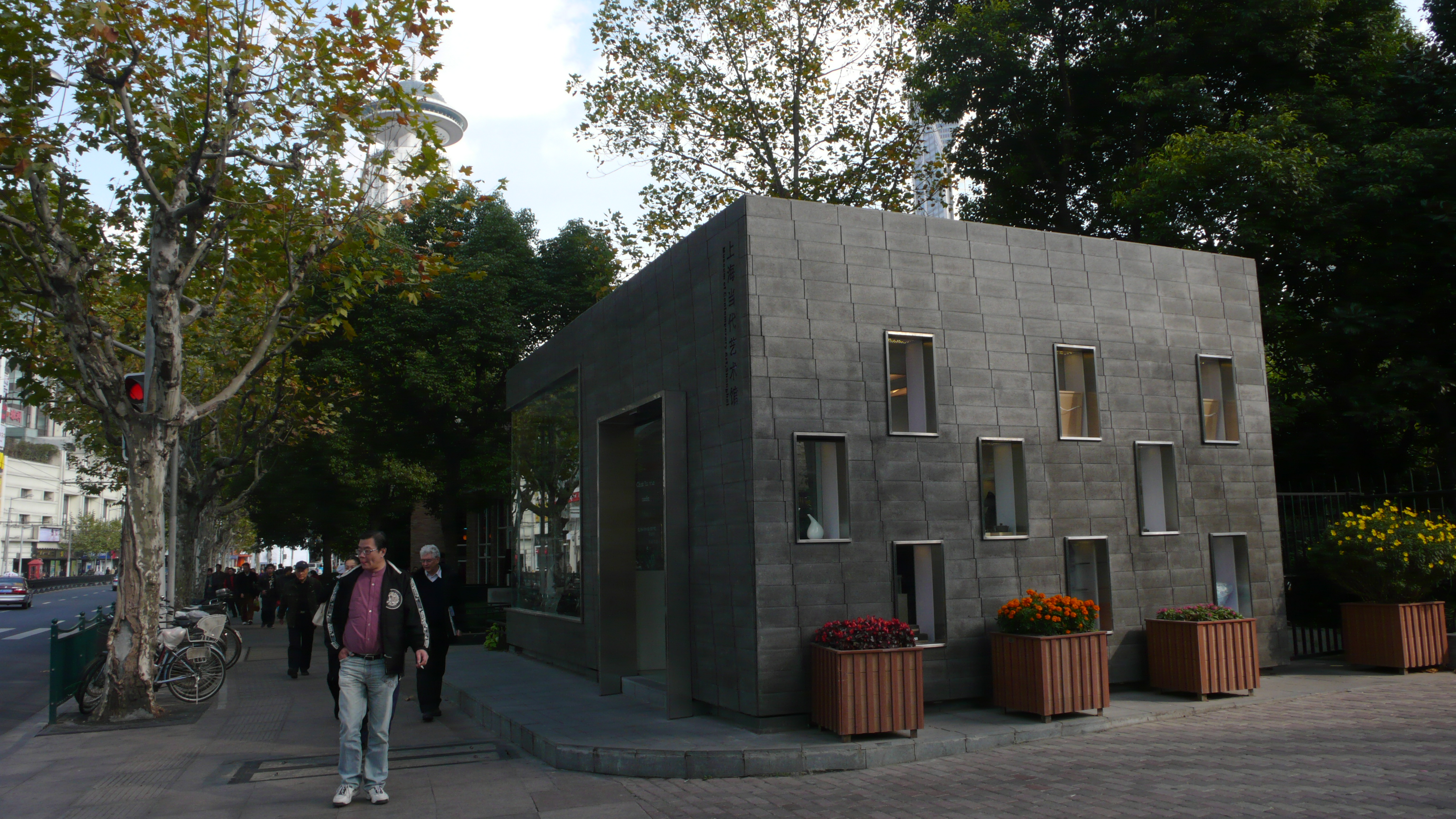
- Exterior view with mural
- Established: 2005; 21 years ago
- Location: People's Park, 231 Nanjing Road (West), Shanghai, China
- Coordinates: 31.233316°N 121.468084°E
- Director: Miriam Kung
- Website: www.mocashanghai.org

Chinese name
- Traditional Chinese: 上海當代藝術館
- Simplified Chinese: 上海当代艺术馆
Transcriptions
Standard Mandarin
- Hanyu Pinyin: Shànghǎi Dāngdài Yìshùguǎn

The Museum of Contemporary Art Shanghai (MoCA Shanghai; Chinese: 上海当代艺术馆; pinyin: Shànghǎi Dāngdài Yìshùguǎn) is a contemporary art museum in the city of Shanghai, China. It is located within People's Park, north of People's Square, the location of a former racecourse that now holds the central administrative building and museums of Shanghai. Surrounding buildings include the Municipal Government Headquarters, the Shanghai Grand Theatre, the Shanghai Art Museum and the Shanghai Museum.

== History ==
MOCA Shanghai was founded in 2005 by the Samuel Kung Foundation as the first non-profit, independent, contemporary art institution in Shanghai. The glass building that houses the exhibitions is a reworking of the former People's Park Greenhouse by Atelier Liu Yuyang Architects. The ground floor and first level of the museum have a total of 1,800 square meters (19,400 square feet) of exhibition space, with the two levels connected by a sweeping steel ramp.

== Exhibitions ==
The museum has focused on the promotion of Chinese and international contemporary art with a set of diverse exhibitions that include both well-known and fledgling contemporary Chinese artists, as well as retrospectives for leading names of the fashion and creative world (recently including Salvatore Ferragamo, Chanel, and Pixar). The Summer 2012 exhibition was one such retrospective for Van Cleef & Arpels, entitled Timeless Beauty. In the past, MoCA has partnered with international organizations to host significant exhibitions. In 2007, MoCA partnered with the Solomon R. Guggenheim Museum to present the contemporary works from the major survey exhibition, Art in America. More recently, MoCA collaborated with the Korea Foundation to present Nostalgia: East Asia Contemporary Art Exhibition, which included works from China, Taiwan, Japan, and Korea. Other international exhibitions include contemporary art from Indonesia, Hungary (in conjunction with the Shanghai Expo), Italy, and India, and an exhibition on Finnish Design in collaboration with Marimekko. Furthermore, MoCA holds a biennale, MoCA Envisage, which focuses on Chinese contemporary art and considers its recent direction and themes.

In addition to exhibitions, MoCA runs seminars, talks, and educational programs throughout the year, for both adults and children.

== MoCA on the Park ==
The third floor of MoCA Shanghai is host to "MoCA on the Park" (formerly "Art Lab"), a full restaurant equipped with rooftop patio and bar. Various artworks populate the space, including those by Raymond Choy, Qu Guangci, Silvia Prada, Zhang Lian Xi, Freeman Lau, Raman Hui, Yan Lei, and Xiang Jing. The restaurant also hosts a number of private events and opening ceremonies.

== See also ==
- M50 Art District
- List of museums in China
- List of contemporary art museums
