= Shanghai Urban Planning Exhibition Center =

- 上海城市规划展示馆
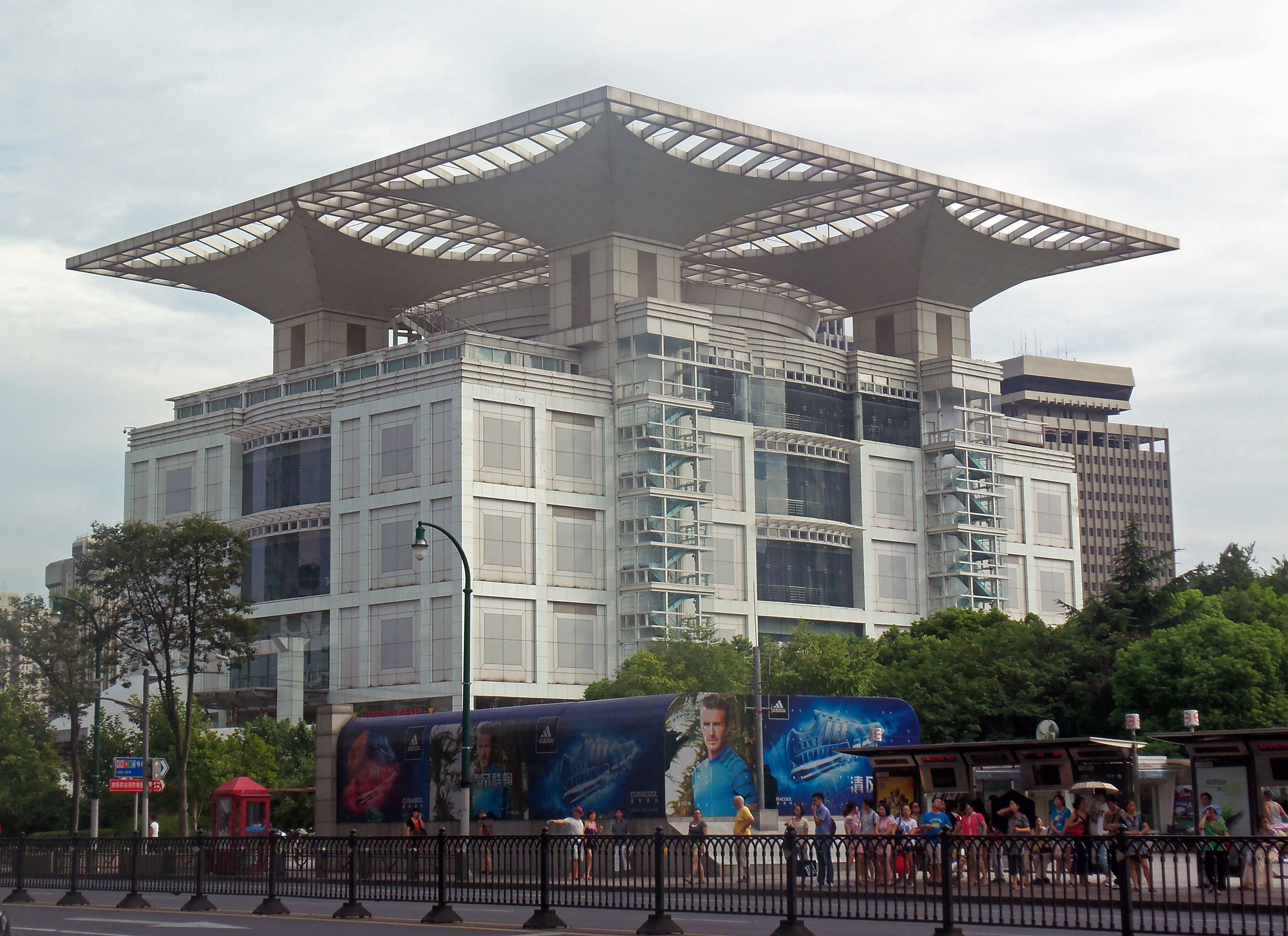
- Museum from northeast and across Xizang Middle Road
- Established: 25 February 2000
- Location: Huangpu District, Shanghai
- Coordinates: 31°14′00″N 121°28′14″E
- Type: Urban planning museum
- Key holdings: Scale model of city
- Visitors: 5 million (since 2000)
- Owner: Municipality of Shanghai
- Public transit access: People's Square (Shanghai Metro)
- Website: www.supec.org.cn

The Shanghai Urban Planning Exhibition Center (Chinese: 上海城市规划展示馆) is located on People's Square, Shanghai, adjacent to the municipal government building. It was China's first city planning exhibition hall and similar halls later became common in major cities and new towns in China.

== Overview ==
The center was China's first city planning exhibition hall and established in 2000. City planning exhibition halls later became common in major cities and new towns in China. These exhibit halls showcase planning models and design drawings in an effort to promote development and increase civic pride.

The Exhibition Center is a six-story building, with two basement levels, which displays Shanghai's urban planning and development. The focus of the exhibit is a large scale model of the entirety of urban Shanghai, showing existing buildings and approved future buildings. Other exhibits relate to Shanghai's history and planned development, including smaller scaled models focussing on particular areas of interest such as the Bund. The Exhibition Center also has space for temporary exhibitions with a wide range of subject matter.

== Building ==
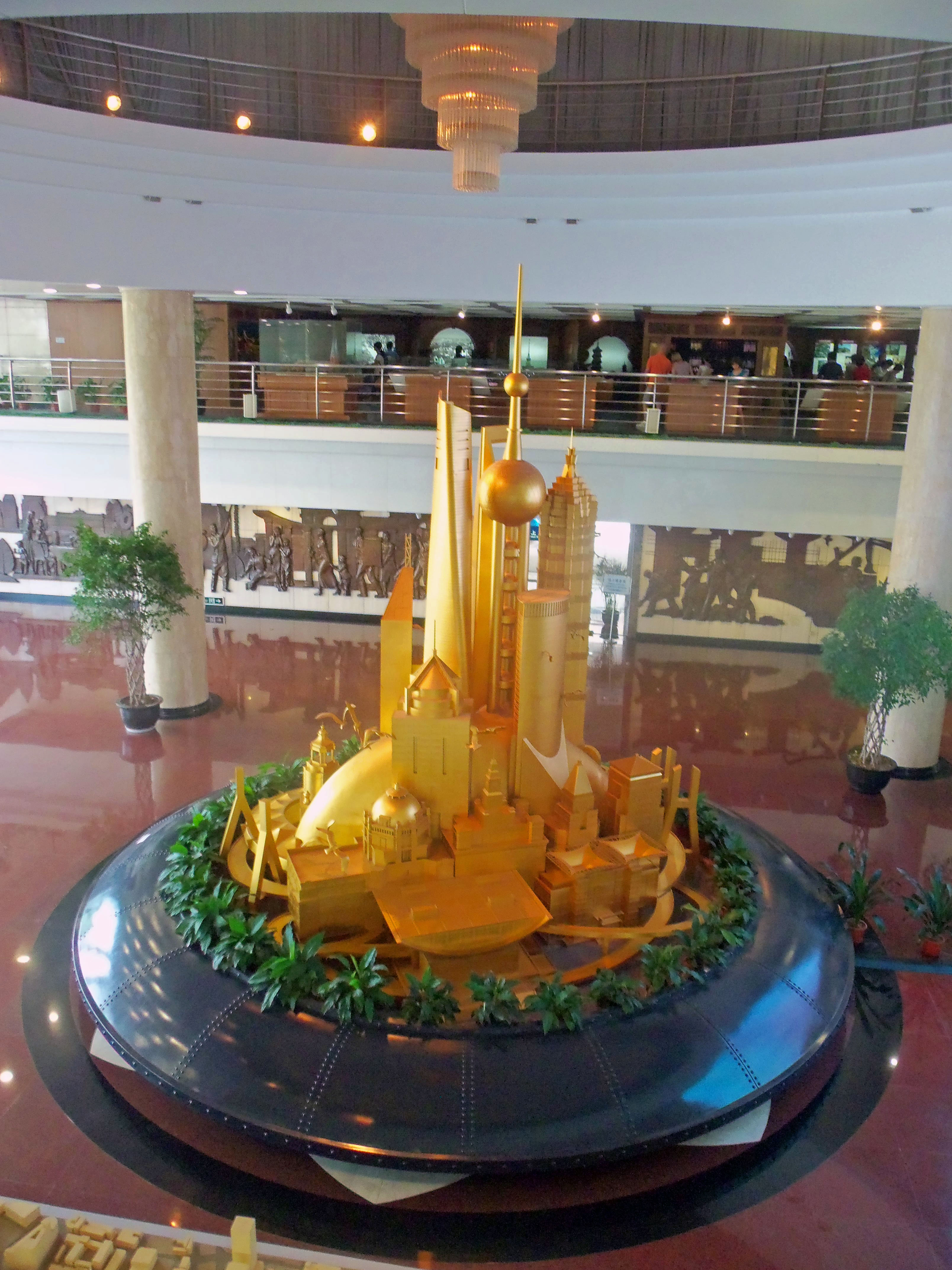
Monument in the lobby including symbols of Shanghai's modernization

The Exhibition Center was built as part of the re-development of parkland at the edge of People's Park and around People's Square in the 1990s and 2000s. The Park and Square together occupy what was once the Shanghai racecourse, and today still make up one of the largest open spaces in central Shanghai.

The building was designed by architect Ling Benli of the East China Architecture Design & Research Institute (ECADI), as a harmonious balance to the Grand Theatre, another contemporary building at the other end of People's Square. The Exhibition Center is 43 metres (141 ft) high, has a white aluminium panel cladding and a symbolic membrane structure roof.

== Exhibits ==
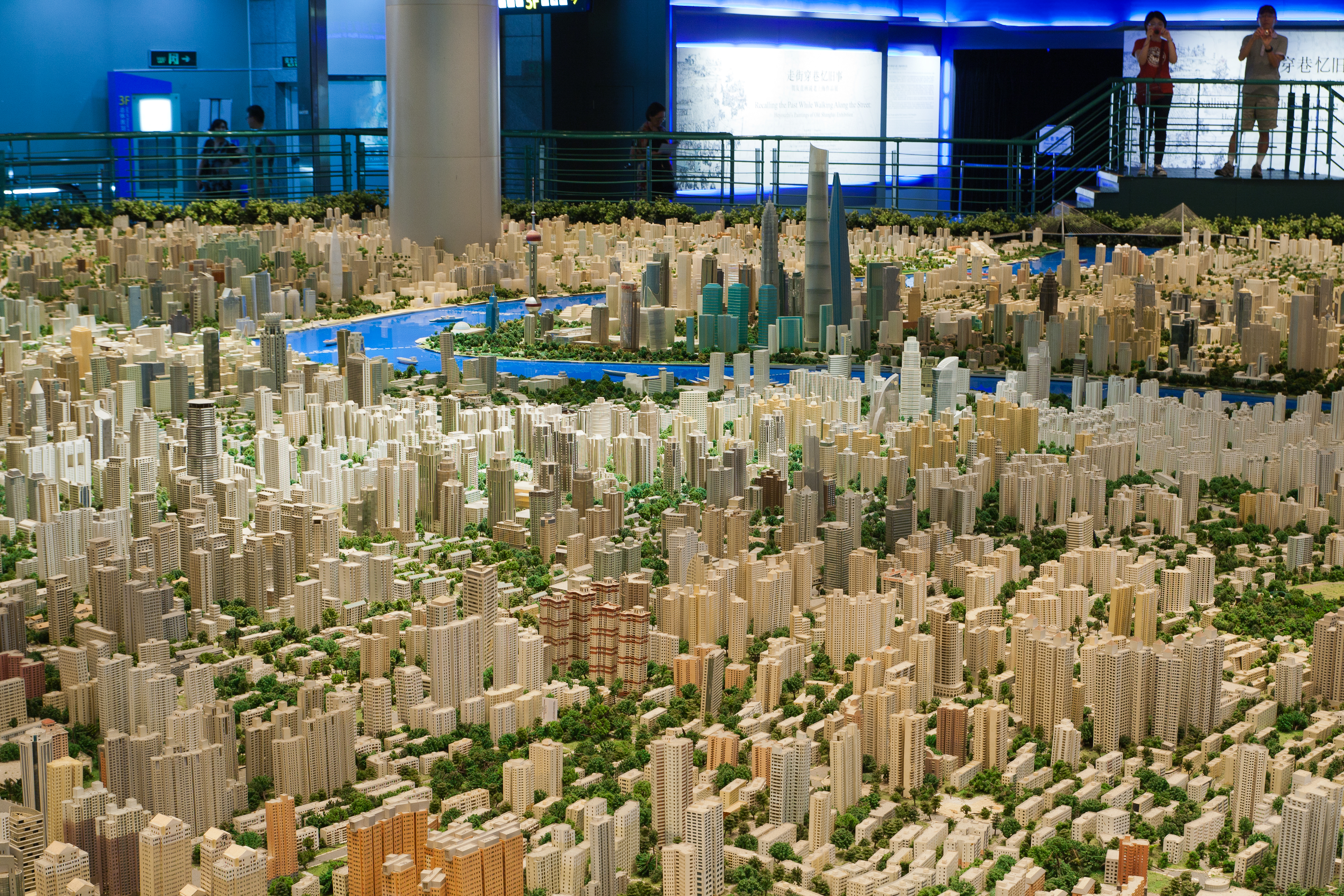
Parts of the scale model of Shanghai

The centerpiece of the exhibition is a huge scale model of the city of Shanghai, showing all existing and approved buildings. Visitors can view the model from alongside or ascend to a gallery running around it for views from above.

The model is intended to represent the entire city, including all planned developments. However, a few support pillars penetrate the scale model. This means certain areas are missing from the model, and some views of the model are obscured by the columns.

Alongside the model is a small theatre room housing a 360° screen. The room plays a video giving the impression the viewer is flying through the Shanghai of the future, viewing notable locations including some of the Shanghai Expo 2010 pavilions.

== See also ==
- Urban Planning Society of China
- Shenzhen Museum of Contemporary Art and Urban Planning
- Panorama of the City of New York
