= MOCAUP =

Museum in Futian, Shenzhen, China

The Museum of Contemporary Art & Planning Exhibition
- 深圳市当代艺术与城市规划馆
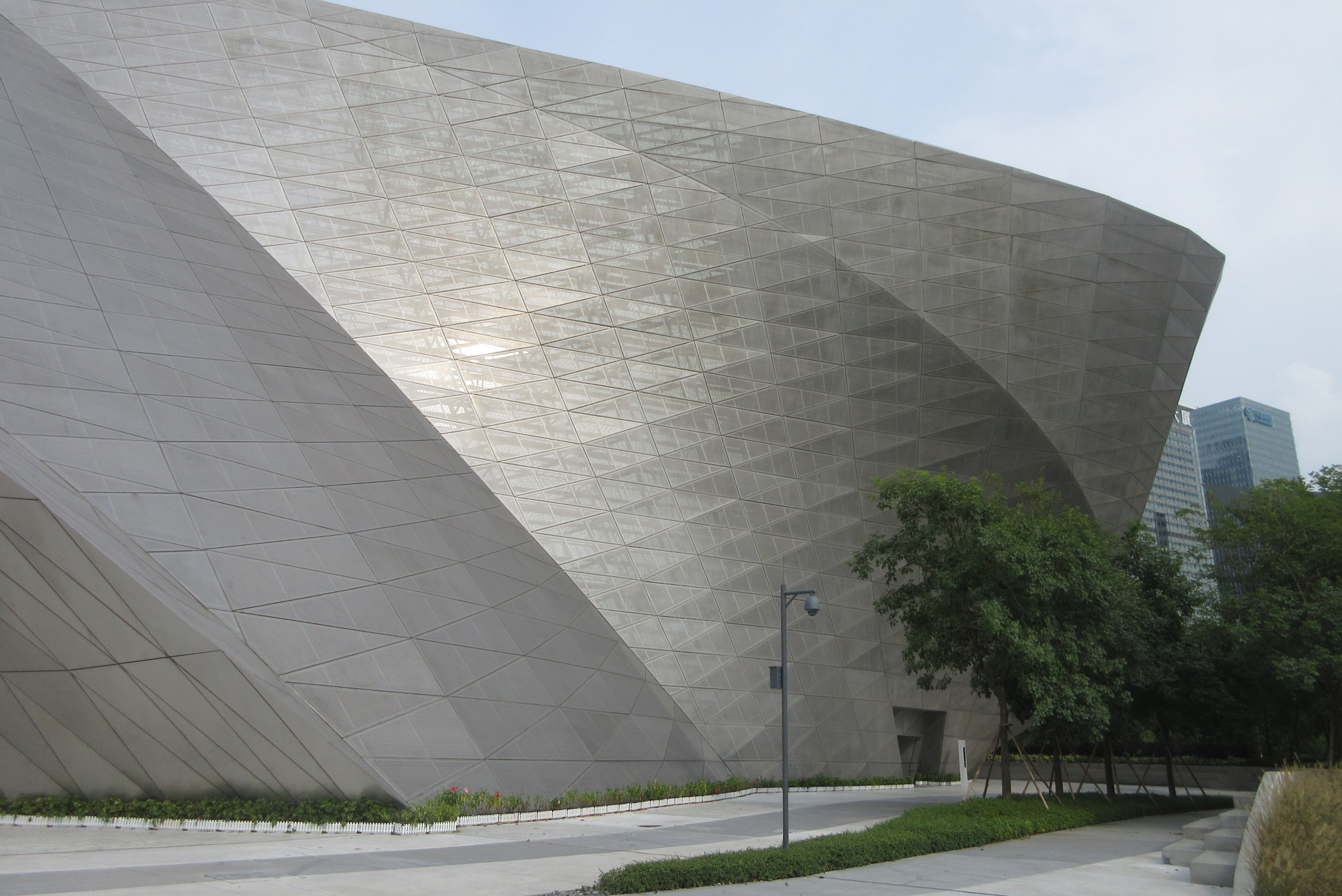
- MOCAPE Exterior
- Established: 2016
- Location: No. 184 Fuzhong Road, Shenzhen, Guangdong Province, China
- Coordinates: 22°32′55″N 114°3′24″E
- Type: Contemporary Art, Urban Planning

Shenzhen Museum of Contemporary Art and Urban Planning (MOCAUP, Chinese: 深圳市当代艺术与城市规划馆) is a museum located in Futian District, Shenzhen, Guangdong Province, China. The museum opened in 2016 and occupies a land area of 29,688 square metres (319,560 sq ft), with a total construction area of 88,185 square metres (949,220 sq ft). It was designed by Coop Himmelb(l)au.

The museum features permanent exhibitions on Shenzhen's urban planning, landmarks, and Shenzhen's history in the reform and opening up.

== Transportation ==
- Children's Palace station, Shenzhen Metro
- Civic Center station, Shenzhen Metro

== Gallery ==
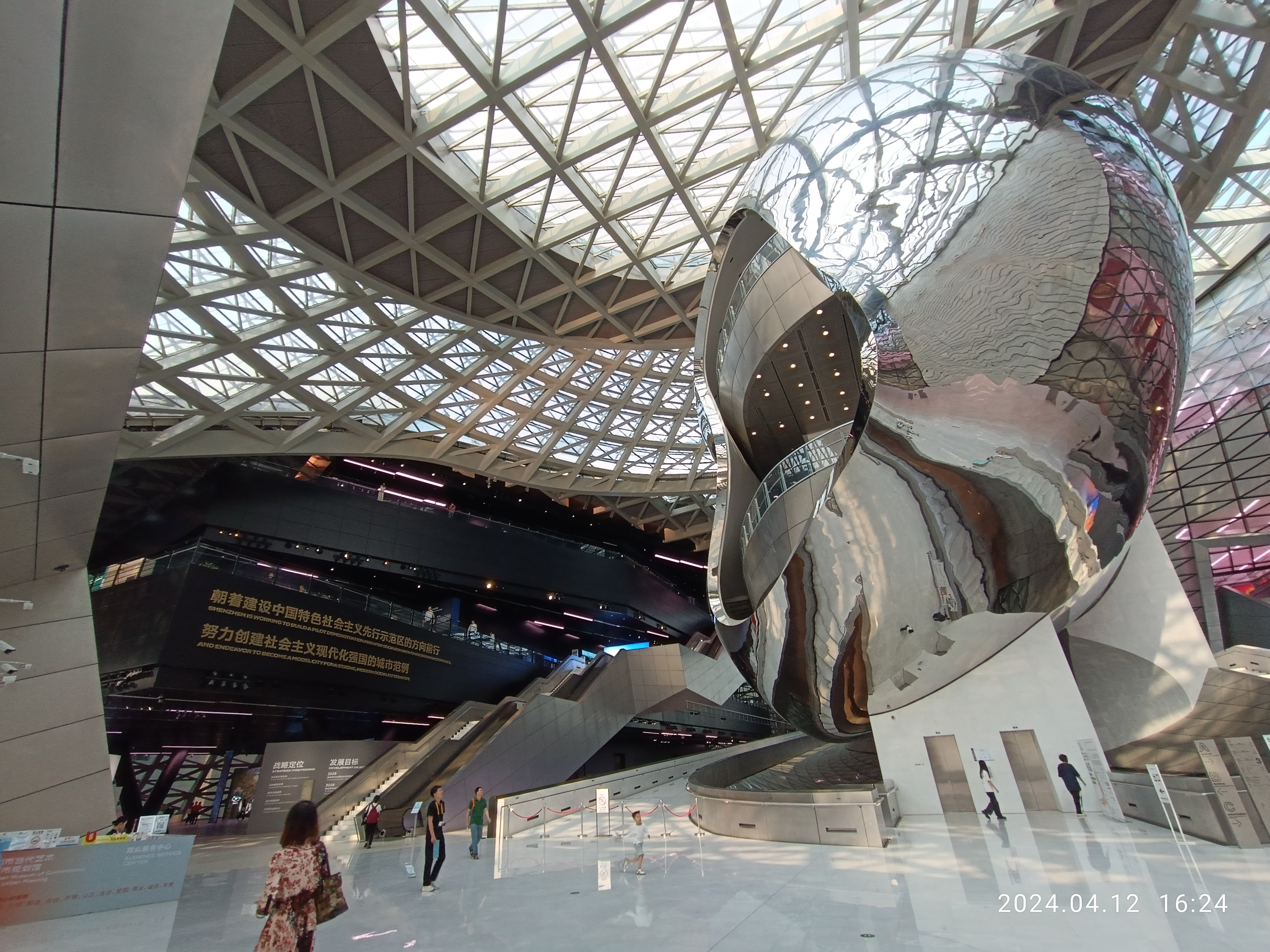

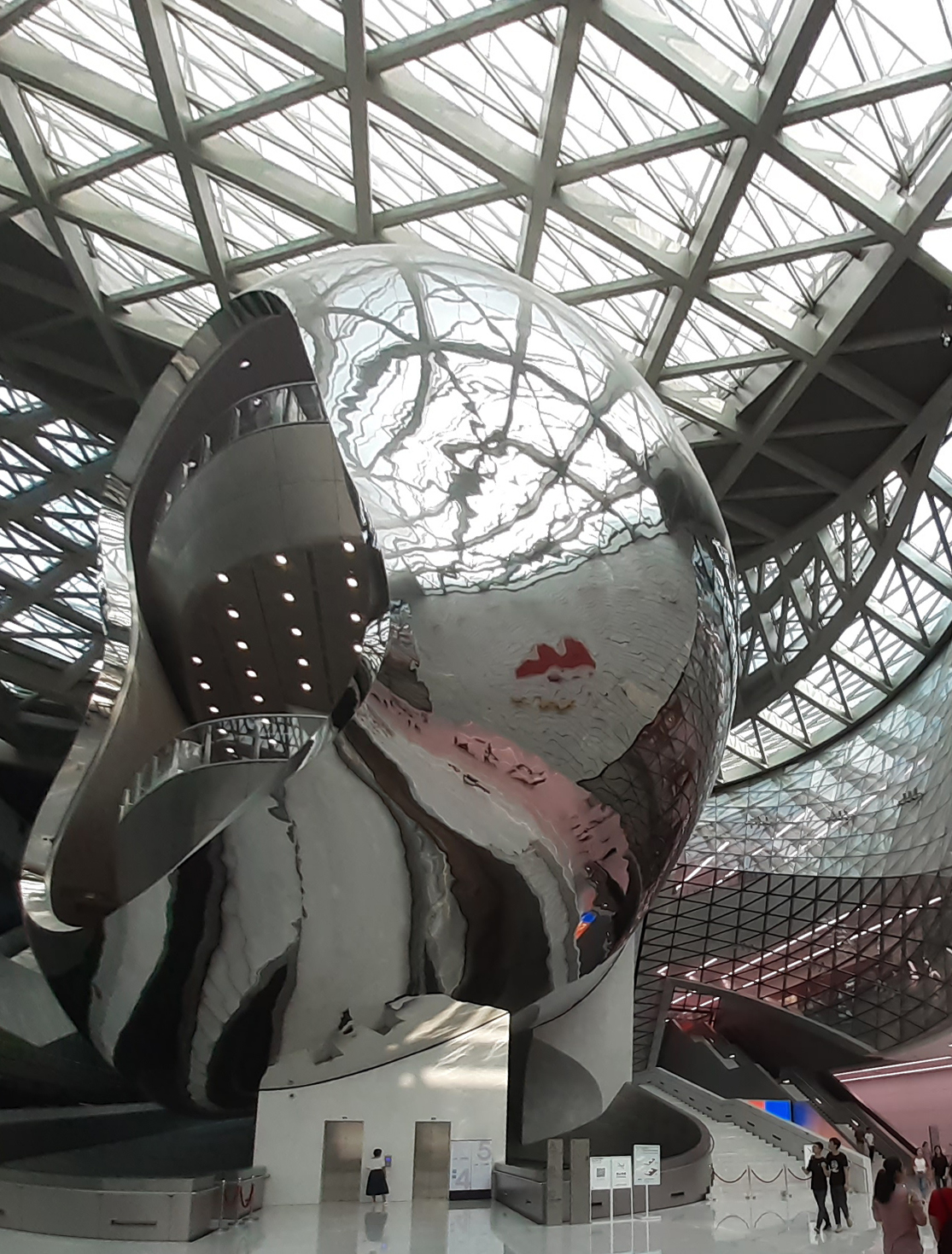

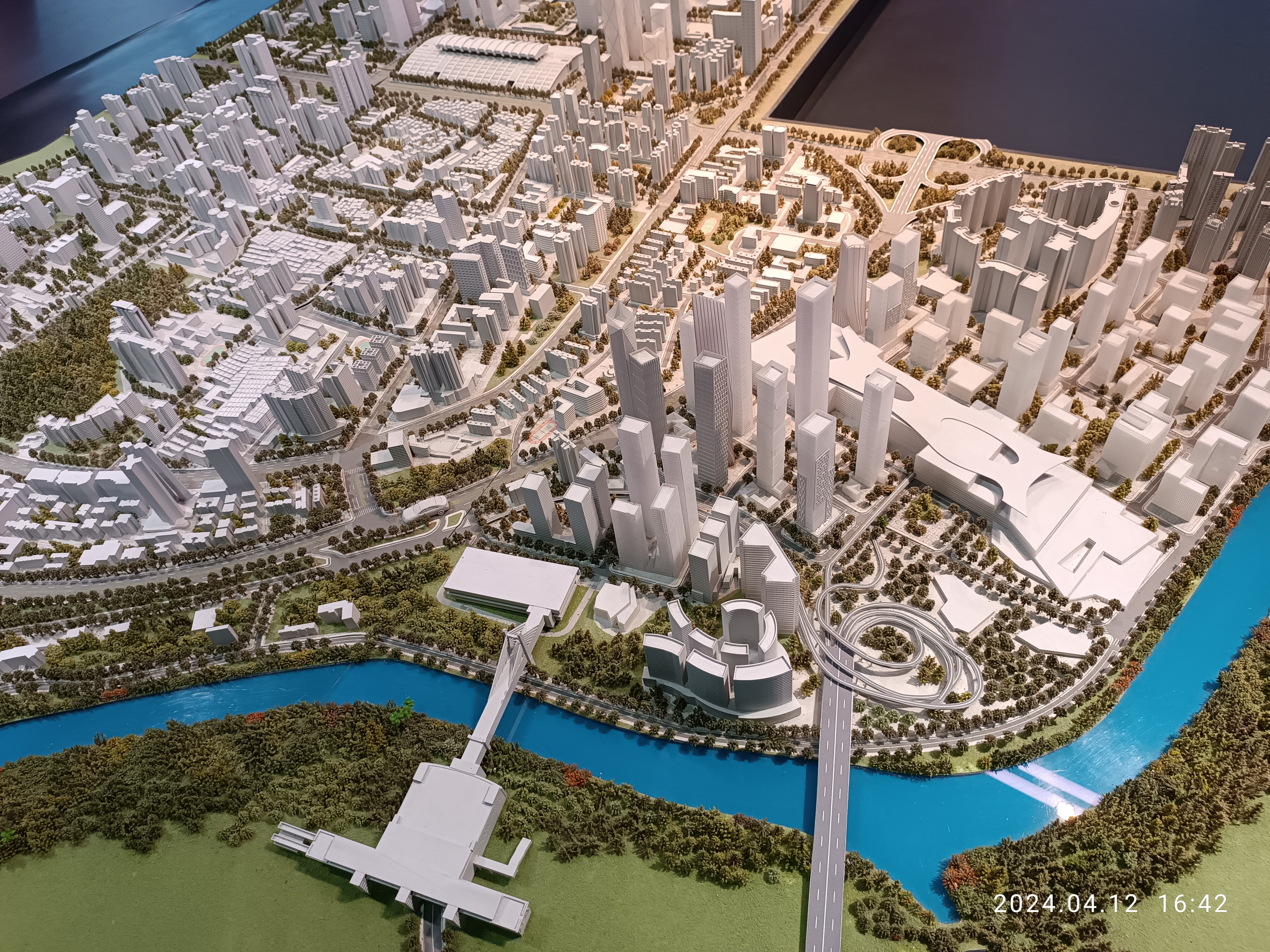

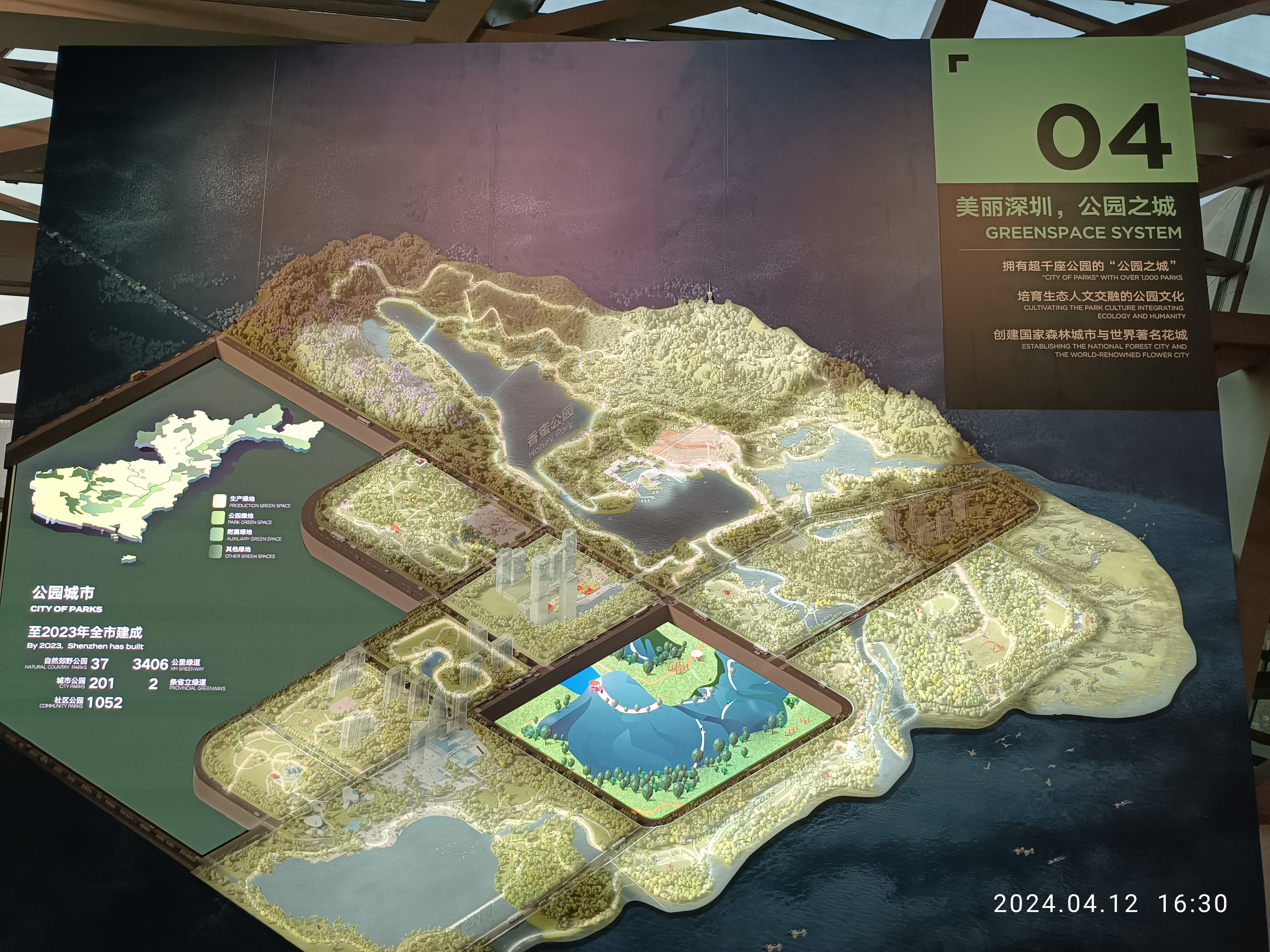

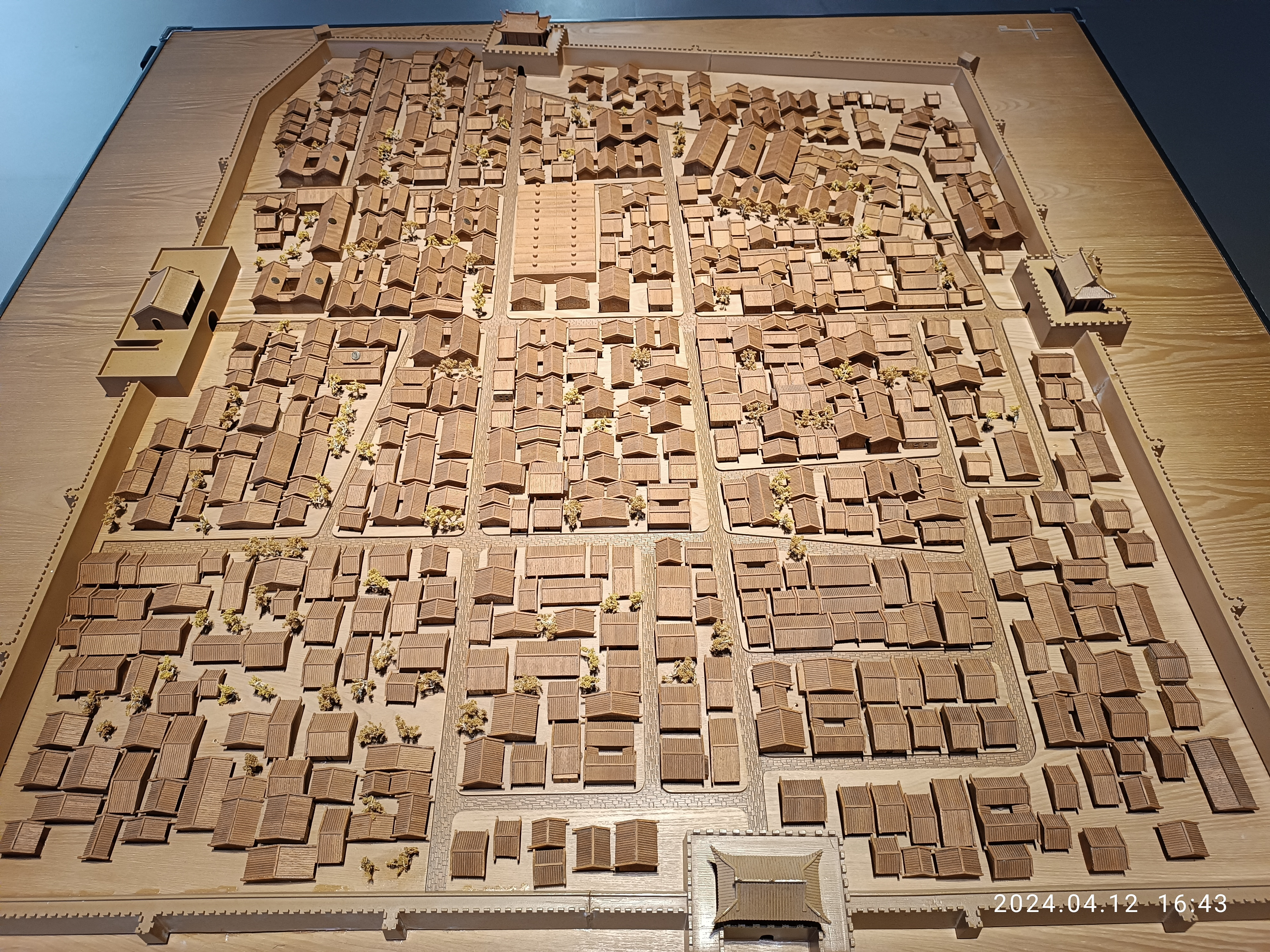

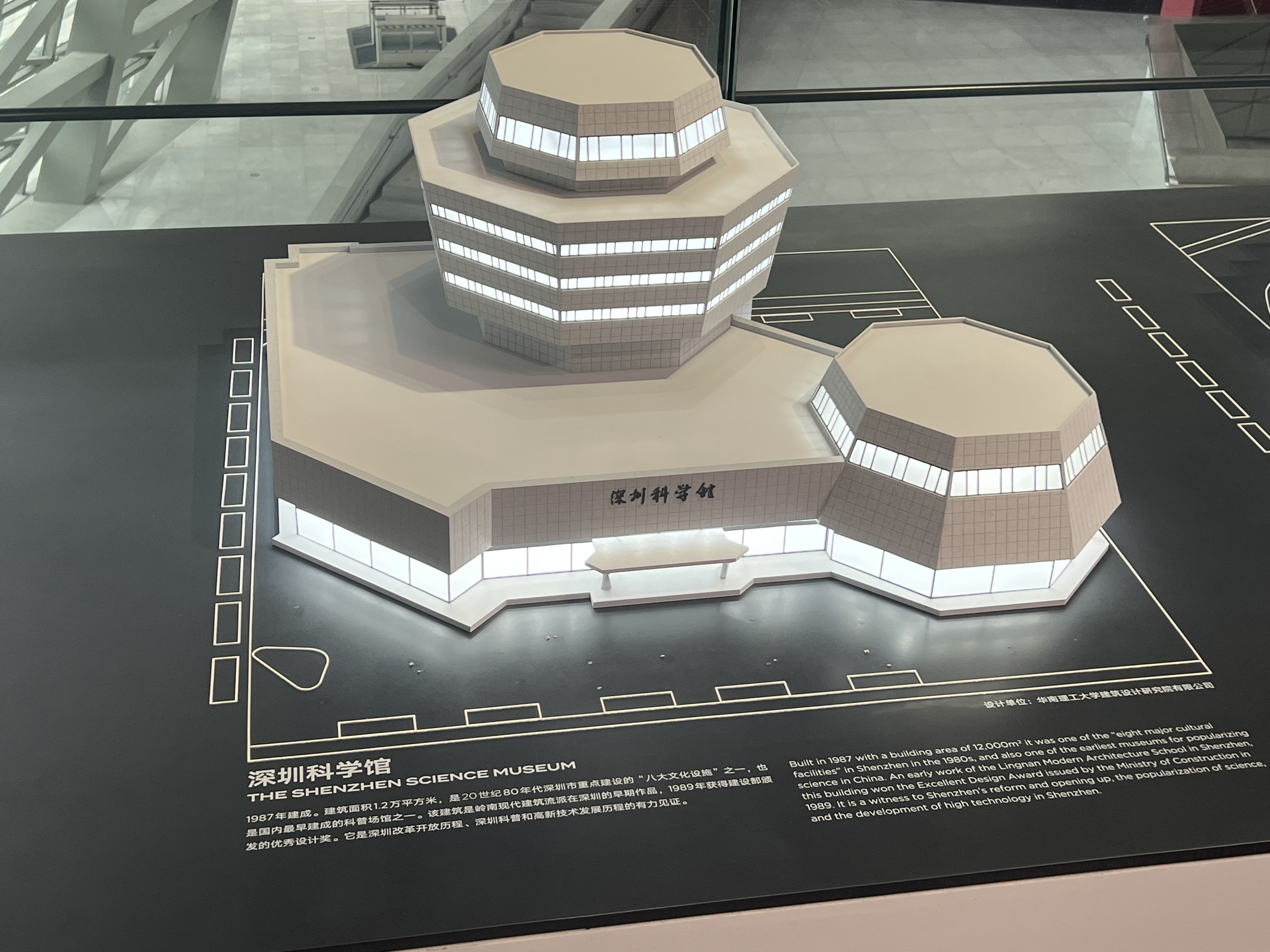

== See also ==
- Shanghai Urban Planning Exhibition Center
- Urban planning in China
- Urban planning Communist countries
- Urbanization in China
