= Radisson Blu Hotel Shanghai New World =

Hotel in Huangpu, Shanghai, China

Coordinates: 31.2368°N 121.4681°E

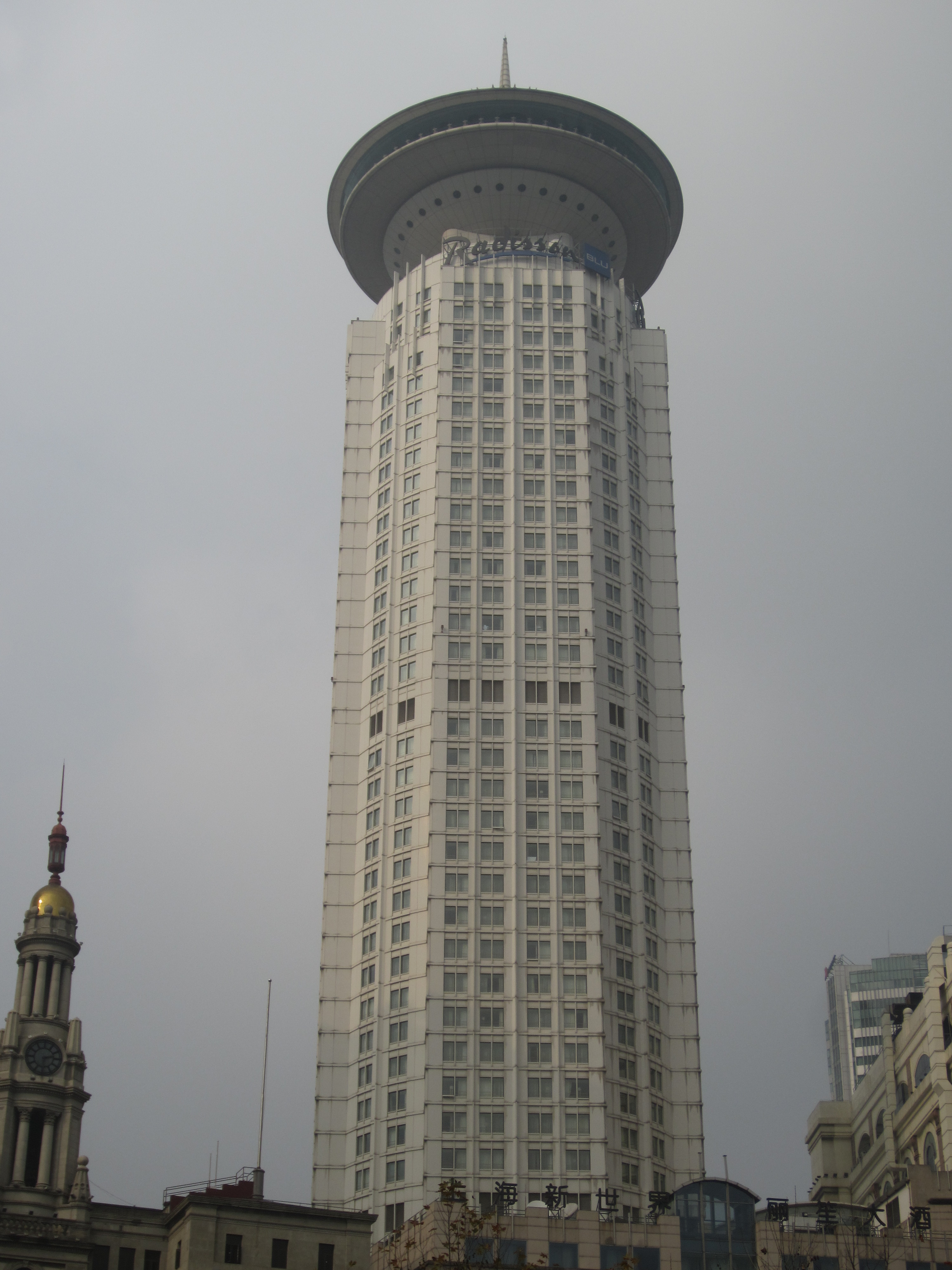
- The hotel in 2015
- Interactive map of the Radisson Blu Hotel Shanghai New World area

General information
- Location: 88 Nanjing Road West, Shanghai, China
- Completed: 2003

Height
- Architectural: 208 m (682 ft)

Technical details
- Floor count: 47

The Radisson Blu Hotel Shanghai New World, also known as Radisson Hotel Shanghai New World or Radisson New World Hotel, is a hotel located at 88 Nanjing Road West (南京路88号), across from People's Park, in Shanghai's Huangpu District, in China.

Time Out Shanghai offers the following description: "This 520-roomed behemoth offers guests the typical Radisson experience, with a few special dining features like Epicure on 45, a revolving restaurant on the 45th floor, and the Sky Dome Bar, which offers live music six nights a week under the hotel's iconic glass ceiling."

== See also ==
- List of tallest buildings in Shanghai
