= May Thirtieth Movement Monument =

Monument in Shanghai, China

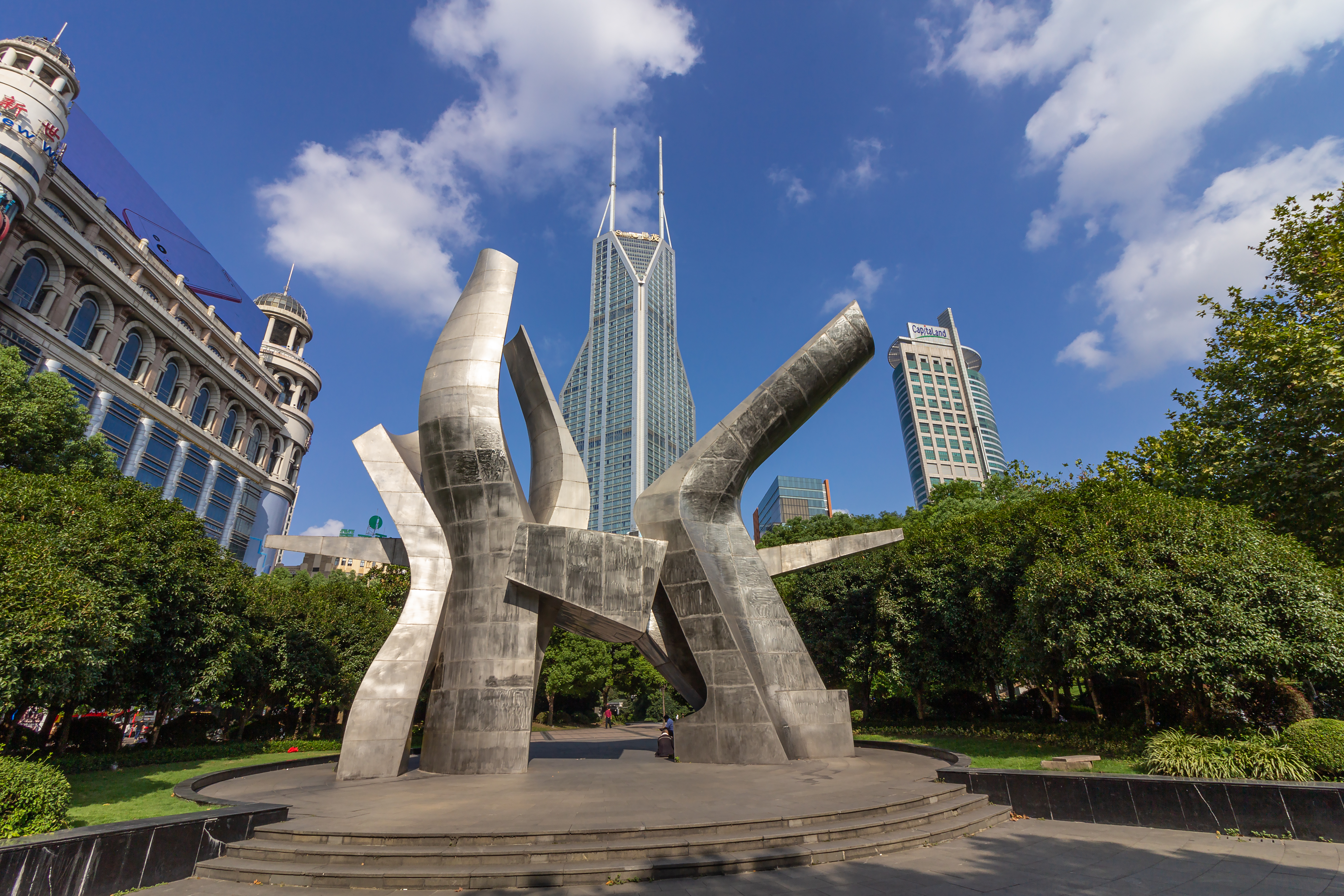
- Location: Shanghai, China

The May Thirtieth Movement Monument is an outdoor sculpture and memorial commemorating to the May Thirtieth Movement, installed at People's Park in Shanghai, China.

== Description and history ==
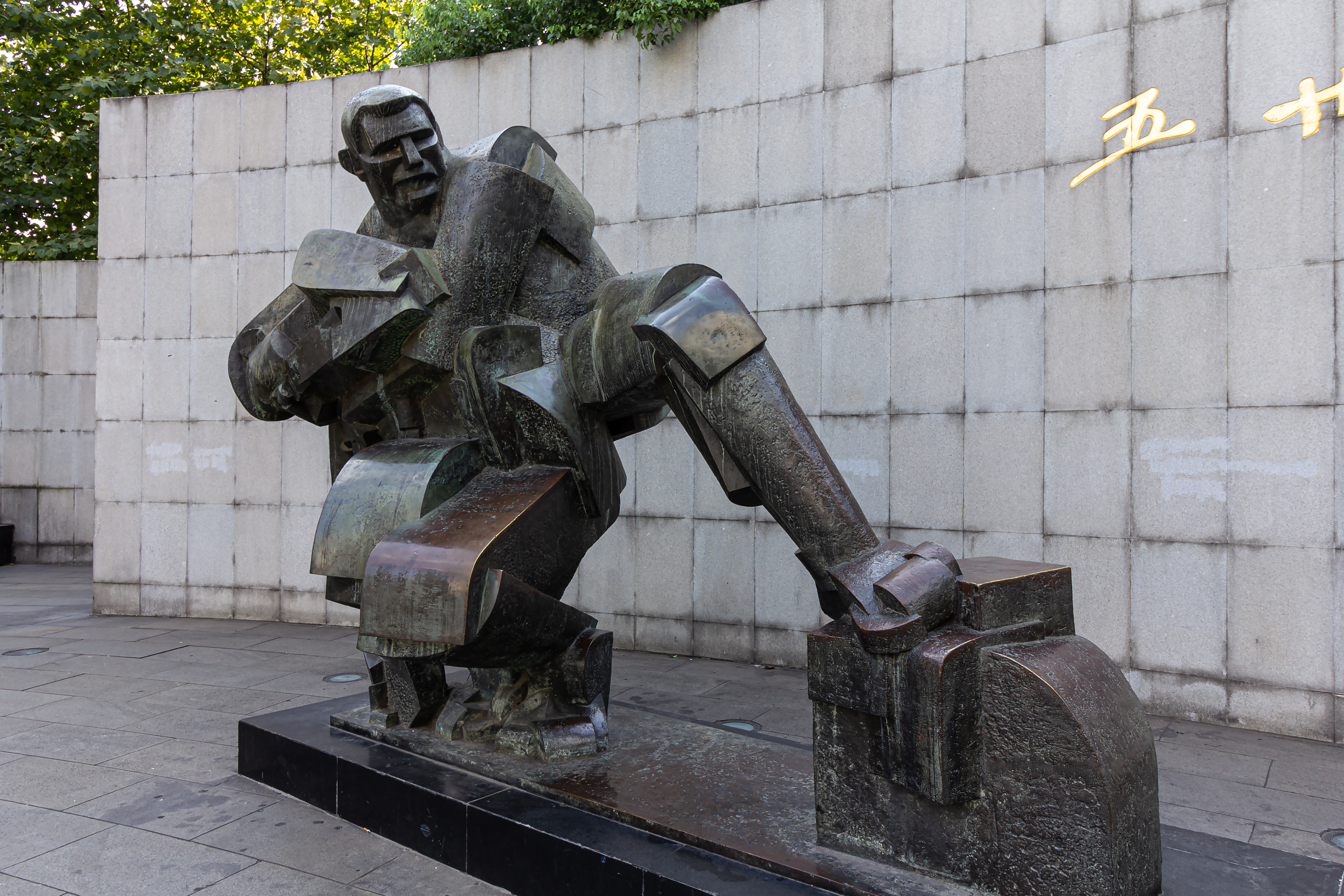
Part of the monument

The steel sculpture was installed just south of Nanjing Road in the 1990s. It depicts a flame and the two characters for 五 and 卅. Behind the sculpture is a bas relief explaining, in Chinese, the events that took place in 1925.

== Reception ==
In 2008, Shanghaiist wrote, "we wouldn't recommend it. The city's homeless population apparently fails to grasp the monument's historical richness and instead tend to use its relative seclusion to literally take a piss on their shared heritage. But, in the spirit of the monument, it's kind of fitting the way underclasses are making their voices heard. Power to the people, right on."
