= People's Square (Shanghai) =

Public square in central Shanghai

Coordinates: 31.229564°N 121.47438°E

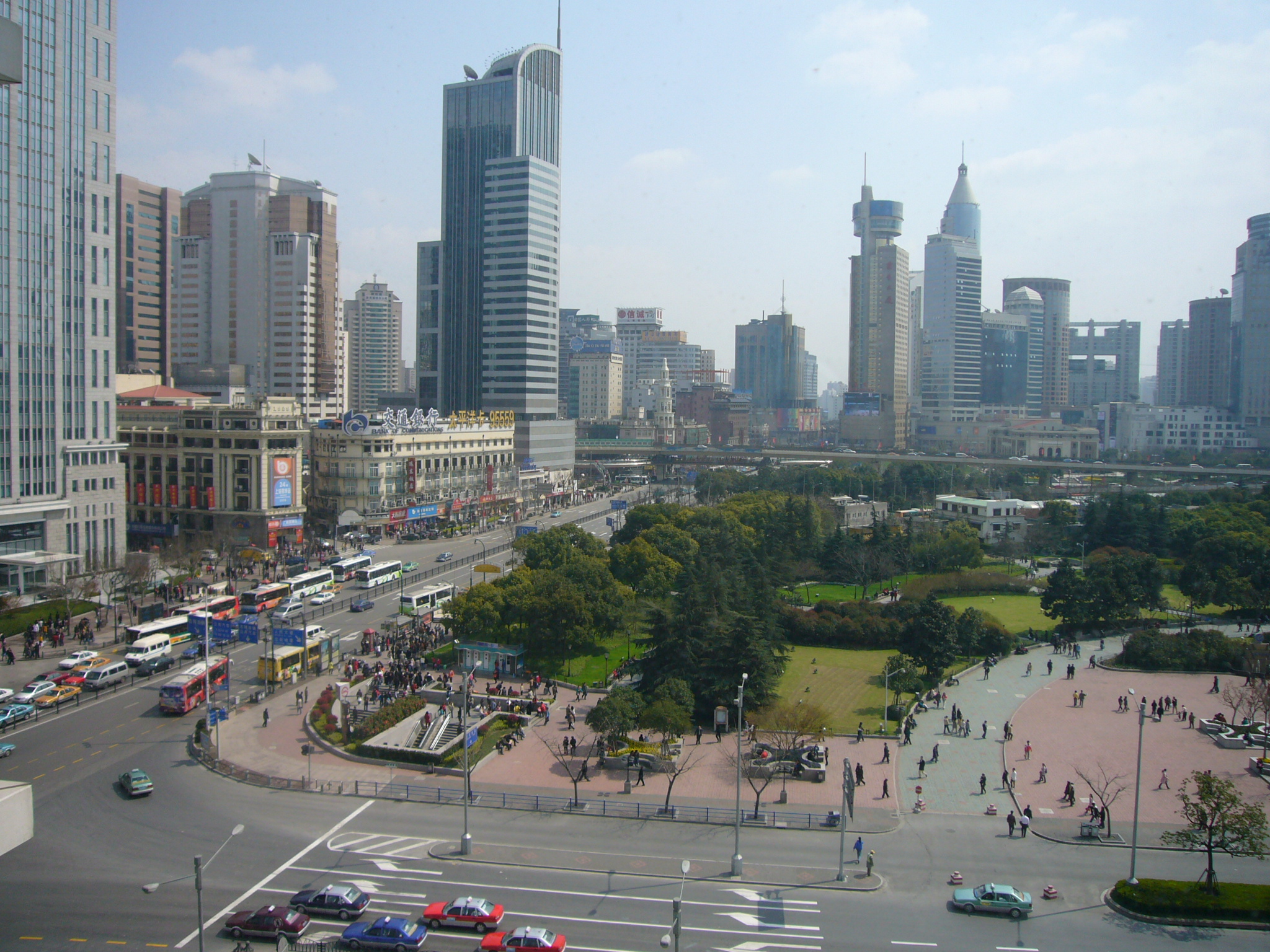
- The southwest corner of People's Square seen from the Urban Planning Museum, March 2007
- Simplified Chinese: 人民广场
- Traditional Chinese: 人民廣場
Transcriptions
Standard Mandarin
- Hanyu Pinyin: Rénmín Guǎngchǎng
Wu
- Wugniu: zen^{6} min^{6} kuaon^{5} zaon^{6}

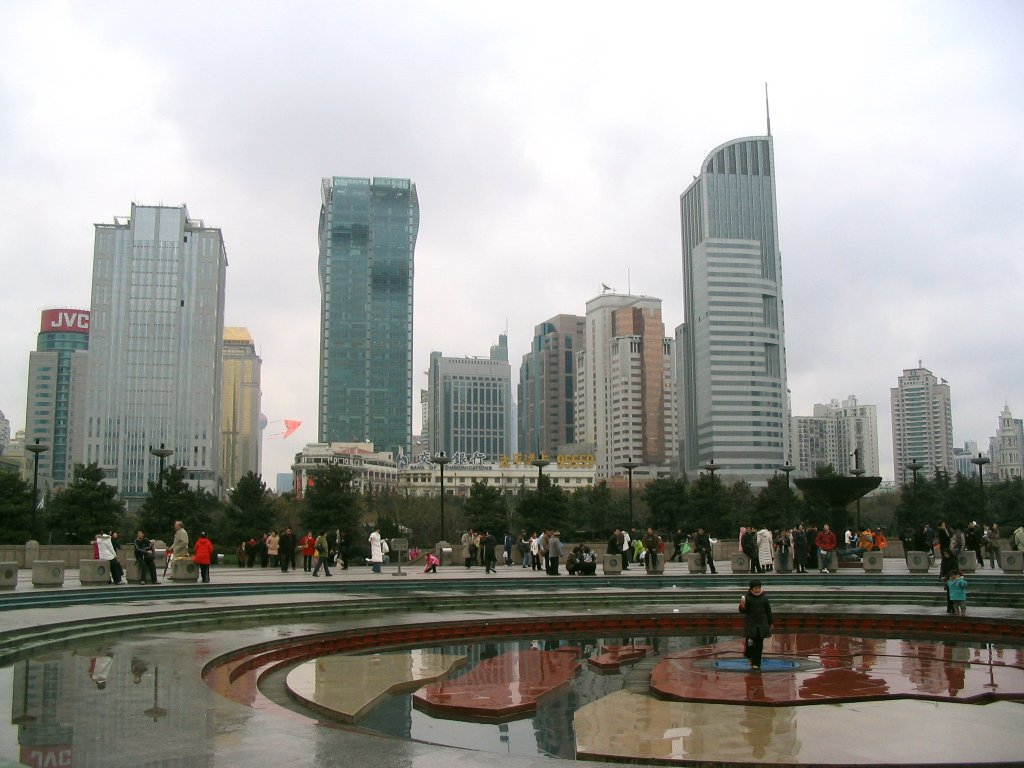
The fountain, February 2005

People's Square (Chinese: 人民广场, Shanghainese: zen^{6} min^{6} kuaon^{5} zaon^{6}) is a large public square in the Huangpu District of Shanghai, China. It is south of Nanjing Road (West) and north of Huaihai Road (East).

People's Square is the site of Shanghai's municipal government headquarters building and the standard reference point for measurement of distance of almost all highways in the Shanghai municipality is set in the north of the square, near the fountain.

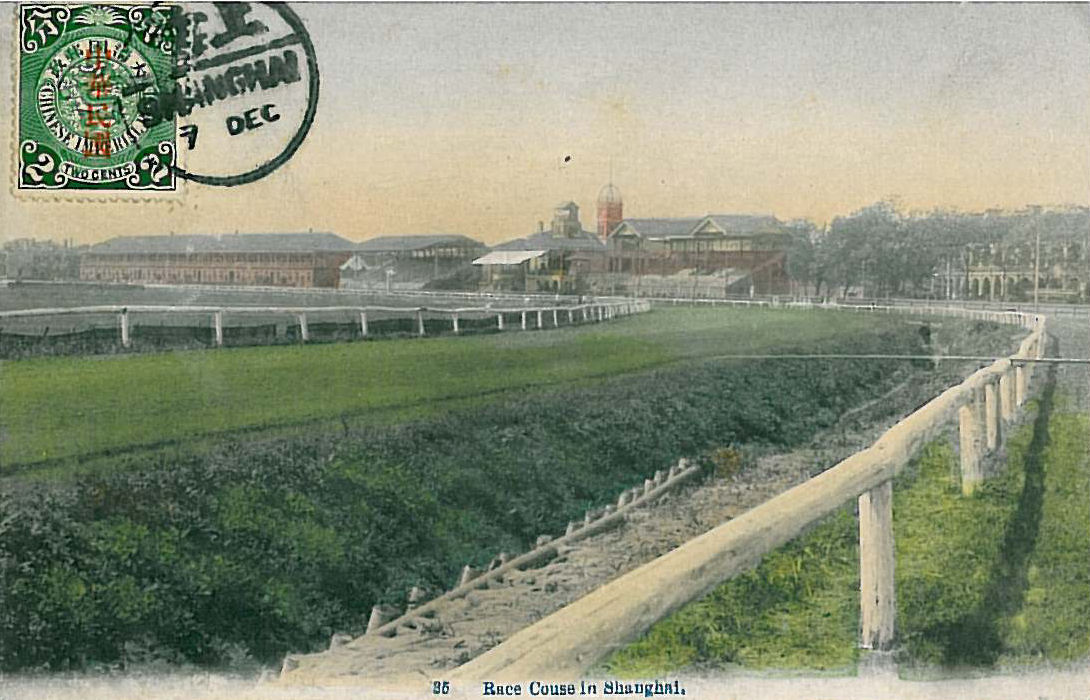
The Shanghai Racecourse in 1912.

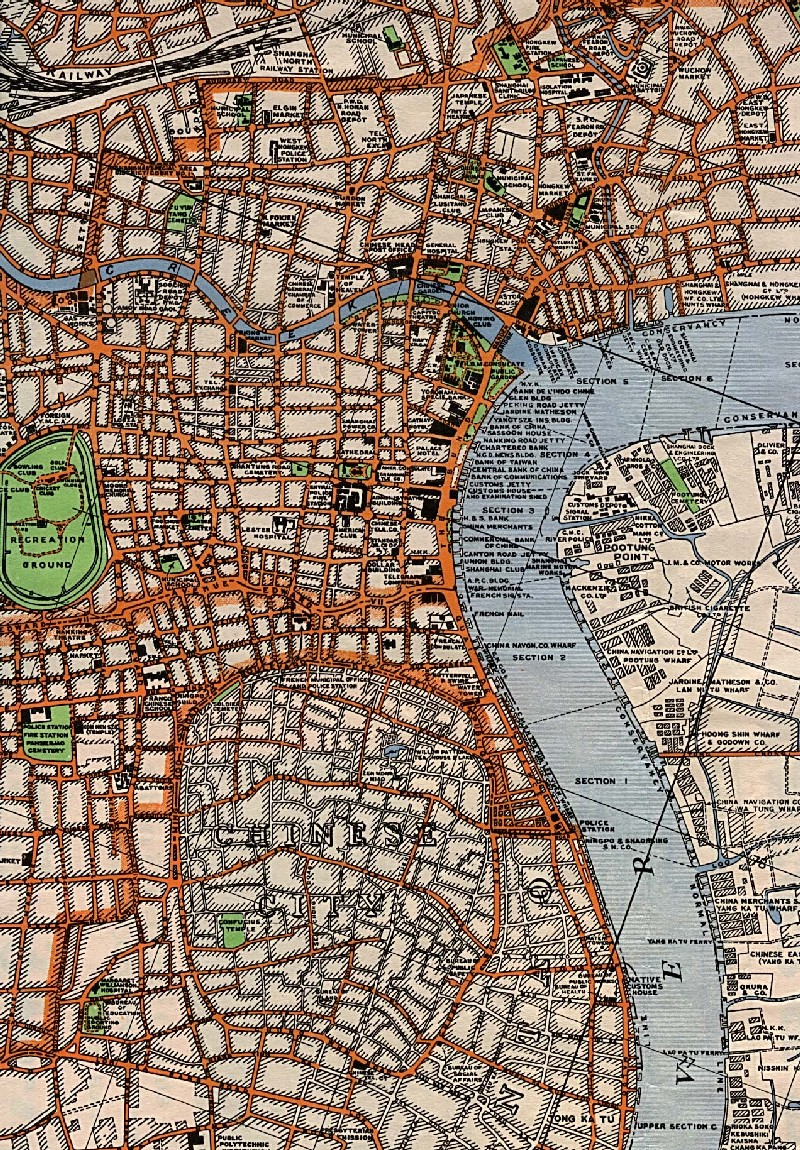
A 1933 map of Shanghai, including the racetrack on left in green.

== History ==
Prior to 1949 and the establishment of the People's Republic of China, what is now People's Square was a course for horse racing owned by the Shanghai Race Club. Gambling and horse racing ceased during World War II and was not permitted to re-commence by the Republic of China government after the war. After the Chinese Civil War, the new Communist government continued the ban and, when the club ran into financial difficulties, took over the grounds and a part of the race course became People's Square, which included a large avenue and spectator stands for use during parades.

In the 1990s, major changes were made to the square. The Shanghai Municipal Government was moved here from the former HSBC Building on the Bund, also the Shanghai Museum was moved here from its previous site in a former office building. More recent additions include the Shanghai Grand Theatre and the Shanghai Urban Planning Exhibition Hall.

Other parts of the race course still remain. The clubhouse buildings became the Shanghai Art Museum, while part of the race track became People's Park, a public park.

== Landmarks ==
Well-known landmarks and tourist attractions surrounding the square include:

- Grand Cinema
- K11, formerly known as the Hong Kong New World Tower
- Municipal government headquarters
- Nanjing Road
- Park Hotel Shanghai (tallest building in Asia, 1934–1952)
- People's Park
- Radisson Blu Hotel Shanghai New World
- Raffles City Shanghai
- Shanghai Grand Theatre
- Shanghai Museum
- Shanghai Art Museum
- Shanghai Urban Planning Exhibition Center
- Shimao International Plaza
- Tomorrow Square
- Madame Tussauds Shanghai

The Shanghai Museum is in a prominent central position in the square, with large fountains immediately to the north.

== Transportation ==
The Shanghai Metro's People's Square Subway Station is an interchange among the subway's Line 1, Line 2, and Line 8. Several bus stops also ring the north and south sides of the square.

== See also ==
- People's Park
