= People's Park (Shanghai) =

Public park in Shanghai, China

- 人民公园
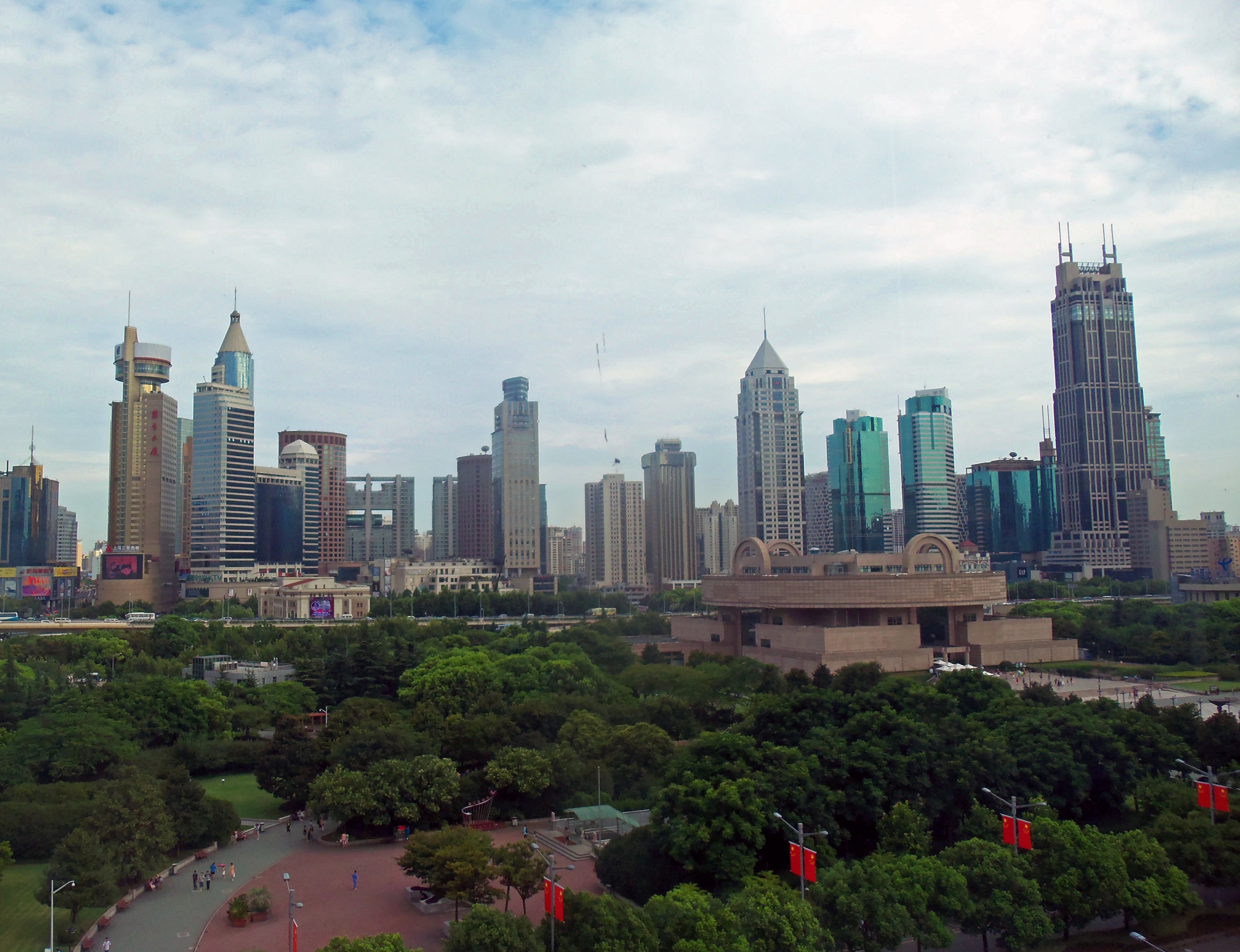
- People's Park and People's Square from the Shanghai Urban Planning Exhibition Center, 2013
- Interactive map of People's Park
- Type: Urban park
- Location: Huangpu District, Shanghai
- Coordinates: 31°13′56″N 121°28′23″E
- Created: 1952

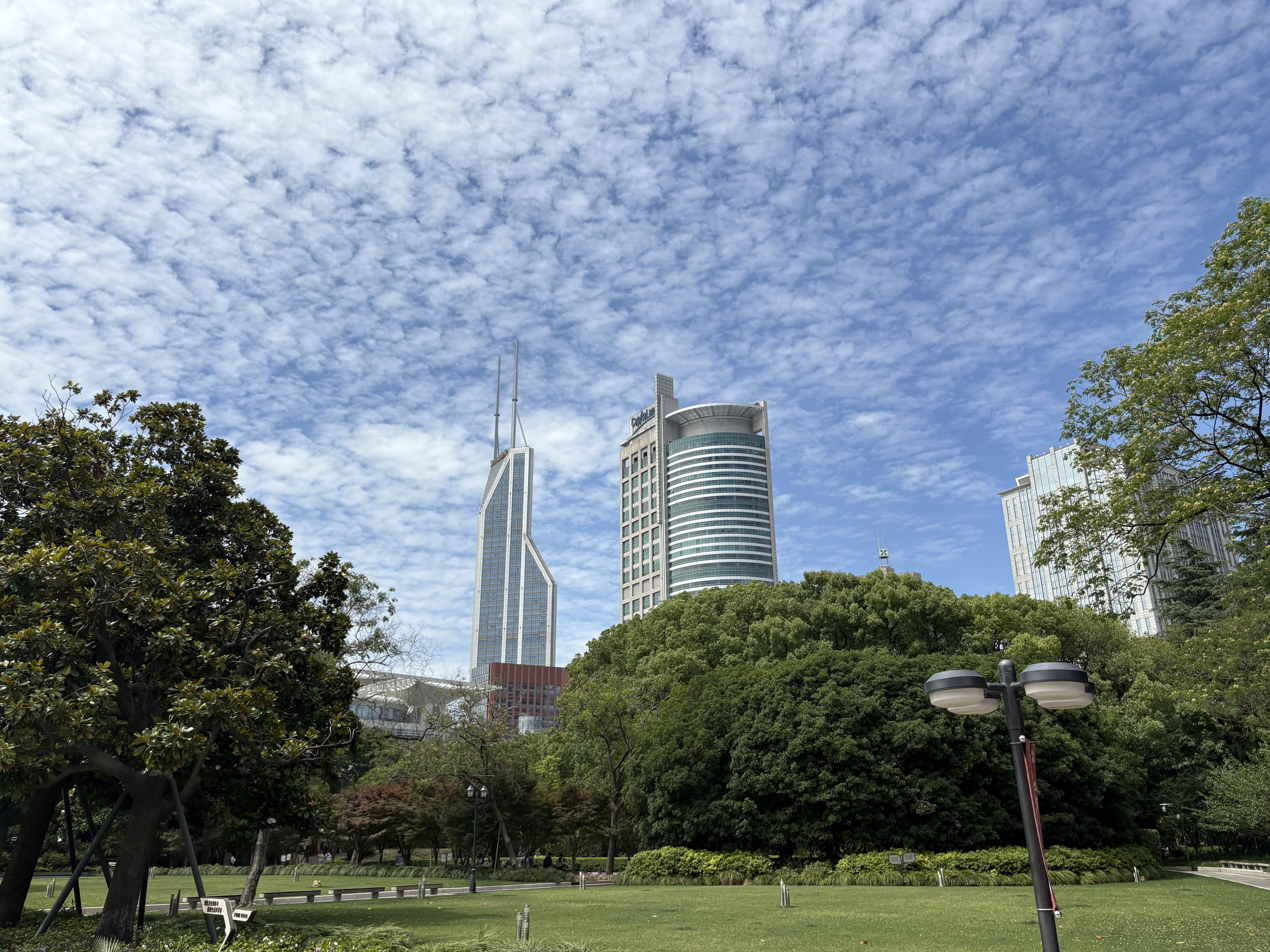
Scenery at the People's Park

People's Park (Chinese: 人民公园; pinyin: Rénmín Gōngyuán) is a public park in Huangpu District of central Shanghai. It is located south of Nanjing Road, a major shopping street, and north of People's Square. Originally the northern part of the Shanghai Race Club's race course, the park was created in 1952. With several major museums and Shanghai's main shopping street nearby, it is one of the top tourist destinations in the city.

== History ==
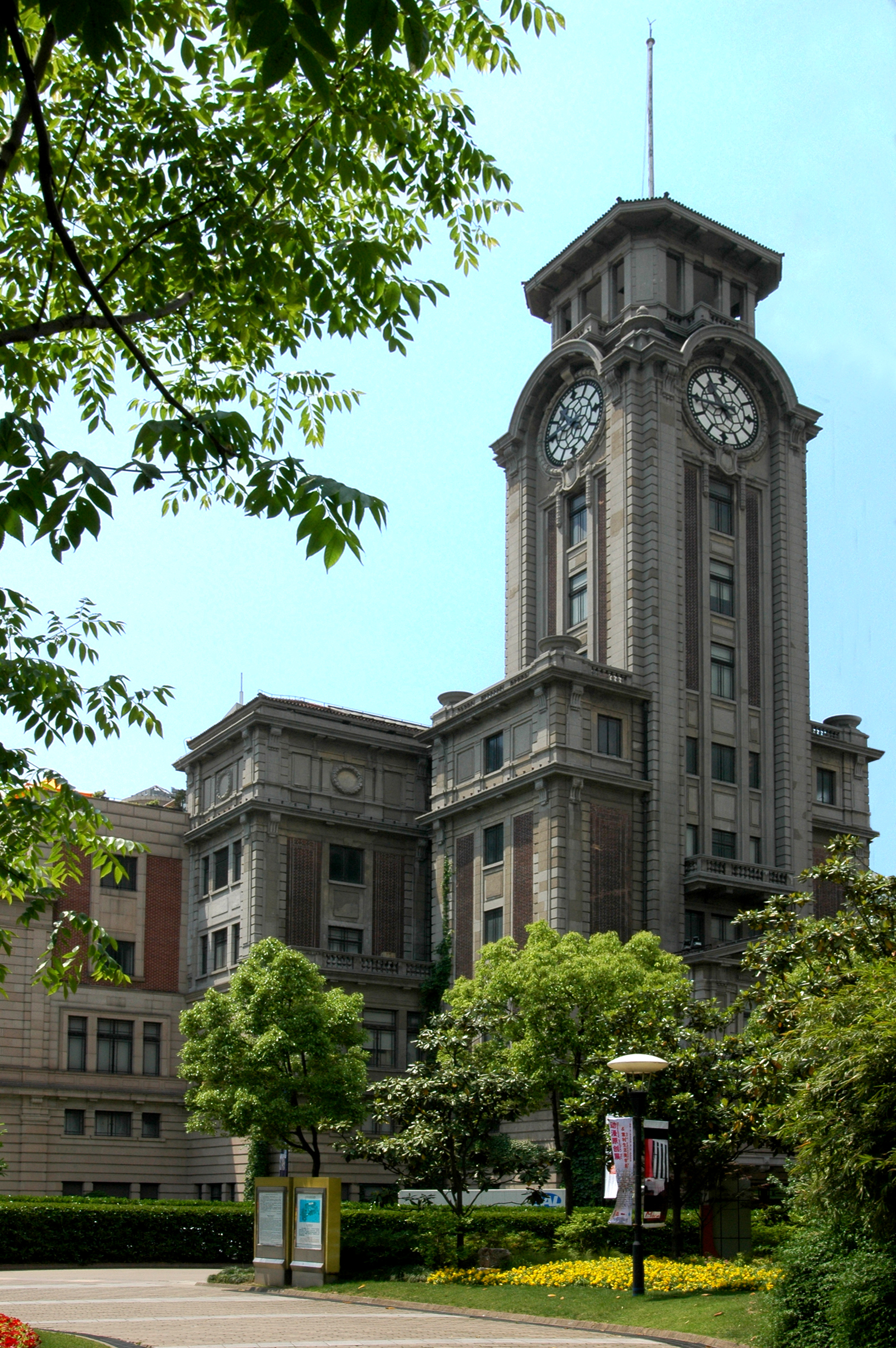
Former Shanghai Race Club building

The park is built on the grounds of the former Shanghai Race Club, which was established by the British in 1862. It was the leading horse racing track in East Asia, and a popular place for the Chinese and the British for gambling on horse racing. The club building, built in 1933, became a landmark in downtown Shanghai.

The club's flagpole was considered a great shame for the Chinese, as it was made from the mast of a Chinese warship captured by British and American troops. When the People's Republic of China was founded on 1 October 1949, the new Chinese national flag was hung from the pole. The new Communist government banned horse racing and gambling, and converted the racecourse into People's Park (the northern half) and People's Square (the southern half) in 1952.

In the winter of 1986–87, the park was the focus of major student protests. Tens of thousands of protesters gathered in the park, and marched to The Bund. They were met by Jiang Zemin, then Communist Party Chief of Shanghai, and demanded democracy and radical political changes. More than two years later, during the Tiananmen Square protests of 1989, tens of thousands of people again gathered in the park and The Bund in a display of solidarity with the protesters in Beijing.

In the 1990s, major changes were made to the area. The Shanghai Municipal Government was moved to just south of the park from the former HSBC Building on The Bund. Other additions include the Shanghai Museum, the Shanghai Grand Theatre and the Shanghai Urban Planning Exhibition Hall, also south of the park.

== Features and facilities ==
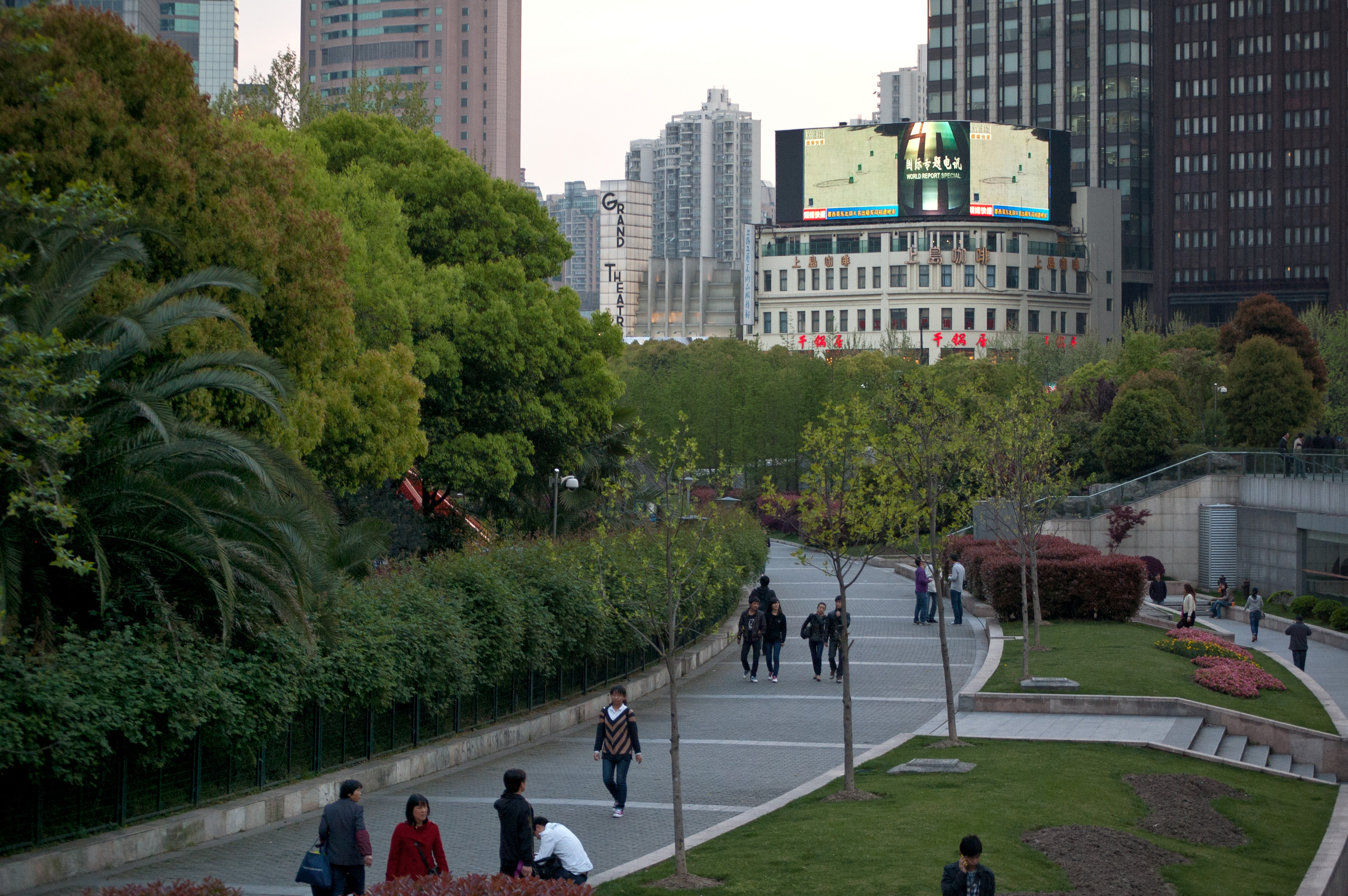
Pathway in People's Park

The park is the location of two museums (Shanghai History Museum, previous Shanghai Art Museum, and Museum of Contemporary Art Shanghai), a large pond with a cafe-bar ("Barbarossa"), and several other attractions such as a funfair. Overlooking the park are a number of highrise buildings including Park Hotel Shanghai and Tomorrow Square.

=== English corner ===
The "English corner" at People's Park is located opposite the Park Hotel, and has existed since 1978, brought into being by the increased popularity of English as a foreign language following market orientated reforms in the late 1970s and early 1980s. It was the nation's first "English corner", and spawned many imitations. A piece about "English corner" is part of Shanghai's junior secondary school English textbook. In its heyday, many participants, including elderly English speakers, younger English language teachers and students, flock to "English corner" every Sunday to practise their English with each other and with any foreign visitors who may have wandered by or visited on purpose. With changes in the method of English education in Shanghai, the popularity of English corner has declined. Generally, participants only gather for a few hours in the afternoon on Sundays, rather than the full day in the past. The number of attendees has also dwindled, and it is today far eclipsed by the nearby "blind date corner" or "marriage market".

=== Marriage market ===
The marriage market or "blind date corner" in People's Park has existed since 2004, in which marriage advertisement listings are publicly posted each weekend.

== Transportation ==
People's Park can be reached on the Shanghai Metro using Line 1, Line 2 or Line 8 to People's Square station.

== See also ==
- May Thirtieth Movement Monument
