= Shanghai Race Club =

Horse racing club in Shanghai, China

Coordinates: 31.230°N 121.473°E

- Simplified Chinese: 上海跑马总会
- Traditional Chinese: 上海跑馬總會
Transcriptions
Standard Mandarin
- Hanyu Pinyin: Shànghǎi Pǎomǎ Zǒnghuì

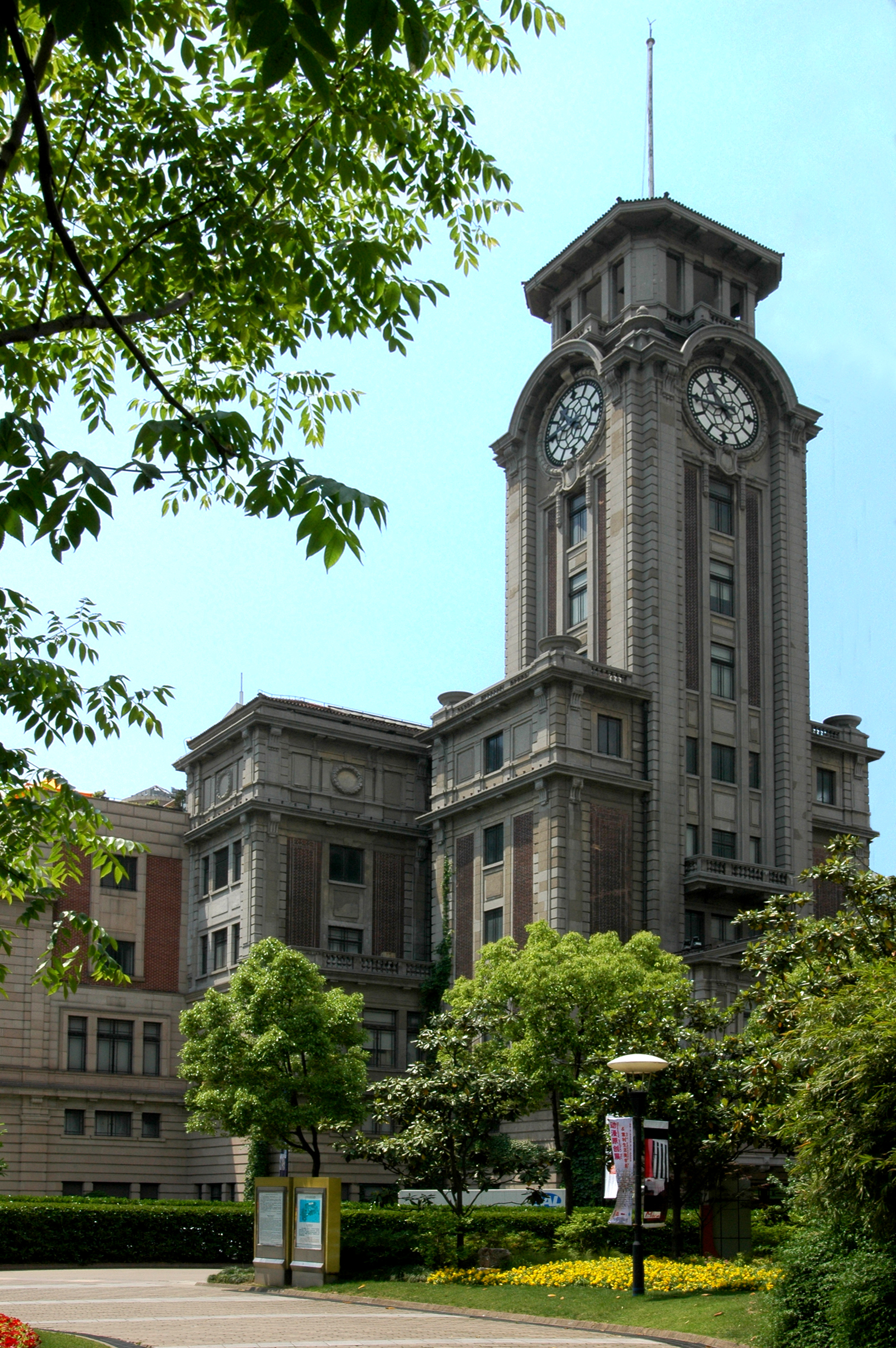
The historic club building of the Shanghai Race Club.

The Shanghai Race Club was a horse racing club located in Shanghai, China. The club was based at the Shanghai Racecourse (跑马厅; 跑馬廳), and the two names are often used interchangeably. Originally the Race Committee of the International Recreation Club, the Race Club was first established in 1850, with the building of Shanghai's first racecourse. In 1862, it detached itself from the Shanghai Recreation Club to become an independent body. The club's activities were affected by the Second Sino-Japanese War and the Chinese Civil War. After the Communist takeover of Shanghai in 1949, the club was placed under military administration in 1951 and its properties taken over by the government in 1954.

== Facilities ==
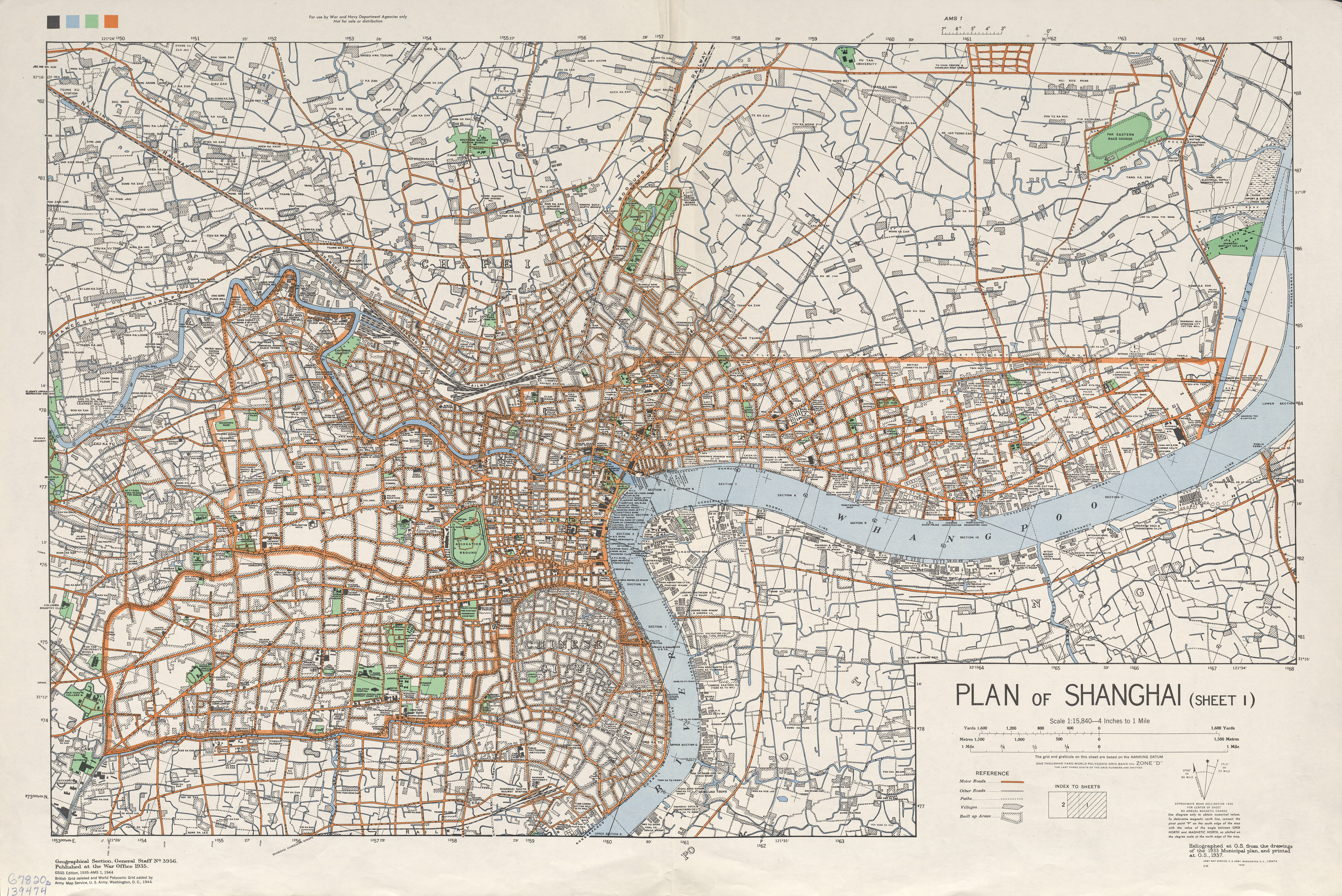
On this map of Shanghai from 1935, the prominent location of the Racecourse is easily discernible as the large round green space in the city centre, to the lower-left of the centre of the map.

From 1862, the Shanghai Race Club was based at the race track it owned in the centre of Shanghai. The grounds later became People's Park and the adjacent People's Square in central Shanghai - which (taken together) are even today still in the shape of the original track. This racetrack, opened in 1862, was the third racecourse owned by the Shanghai Race Club. The turf was described as "smooth as a billiard table".

The Race Club building, which survives to this day, was built in 1934 on the western side of the race track. Its imposing, 10-storey tall tower was long a landmark of central Shanghai. It included a 100-metre (330 ft) long grand stand, with three to five levels. The 1934 building has been described thus:

The grandstand was thought at the time to be the largest in the world, and probably was, while the Race Club, with its marble staircases, teak-panelled rooms, oak parquet floors, and its coffee room which was 100ft by 47ft with a huge fireplace, most certainly ranked as the most sumptuous club of its kind yet built in any country.

The clubhouse's exterior has a neo-classical structure, with eclectic details. A loggia which ran along the second floor of the building was used as the members' stand. The ground floor was the box office and betting hall. A mezzanine level between the ground and first floor contained bowling lanes. The first floor contained club facilities, including a cafe, games room, billiard room and reading room. The second floor contained rooms for members and the restaurant.

== History ==
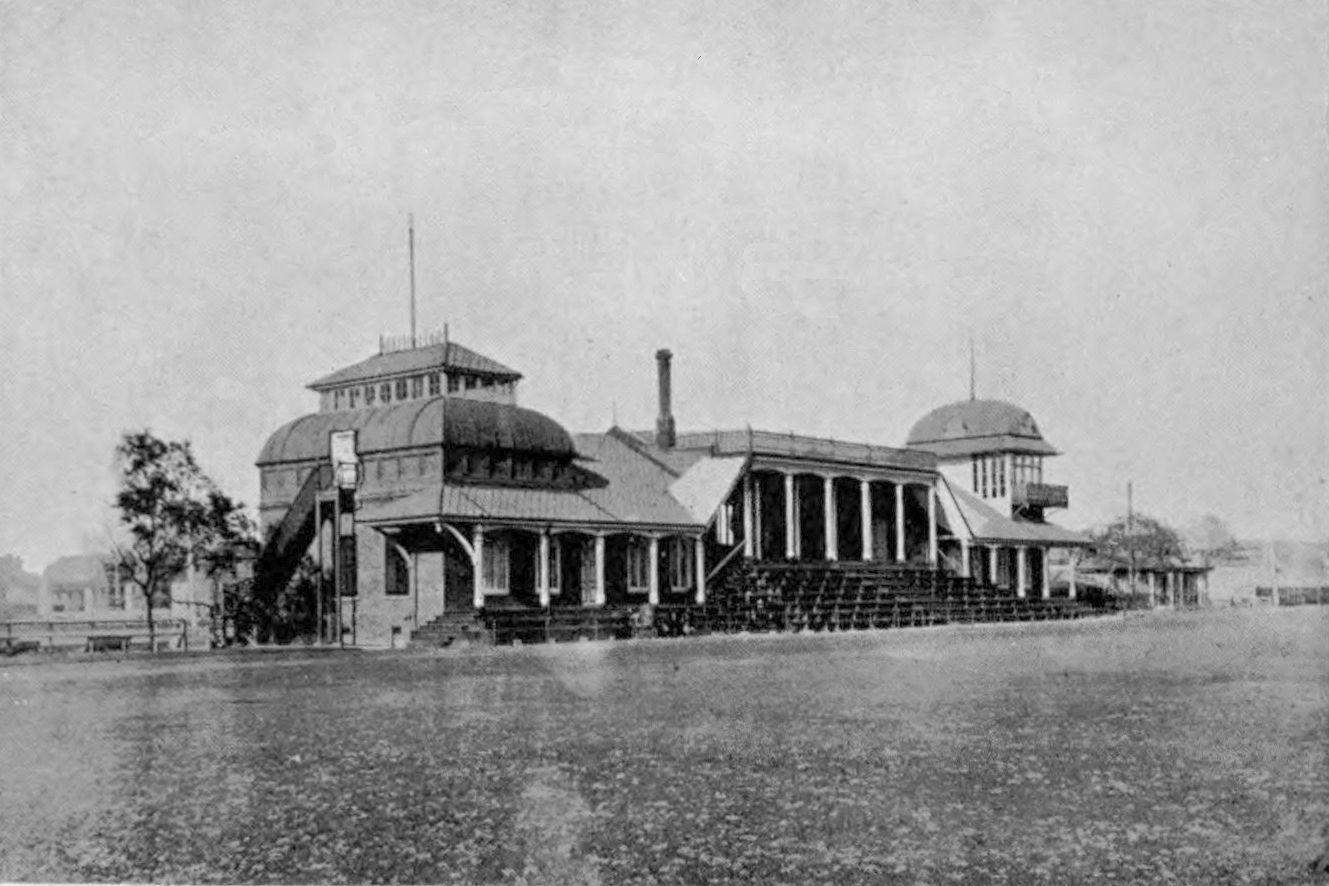
Grandstand at the Shanghai Racecourse, c. 1908.

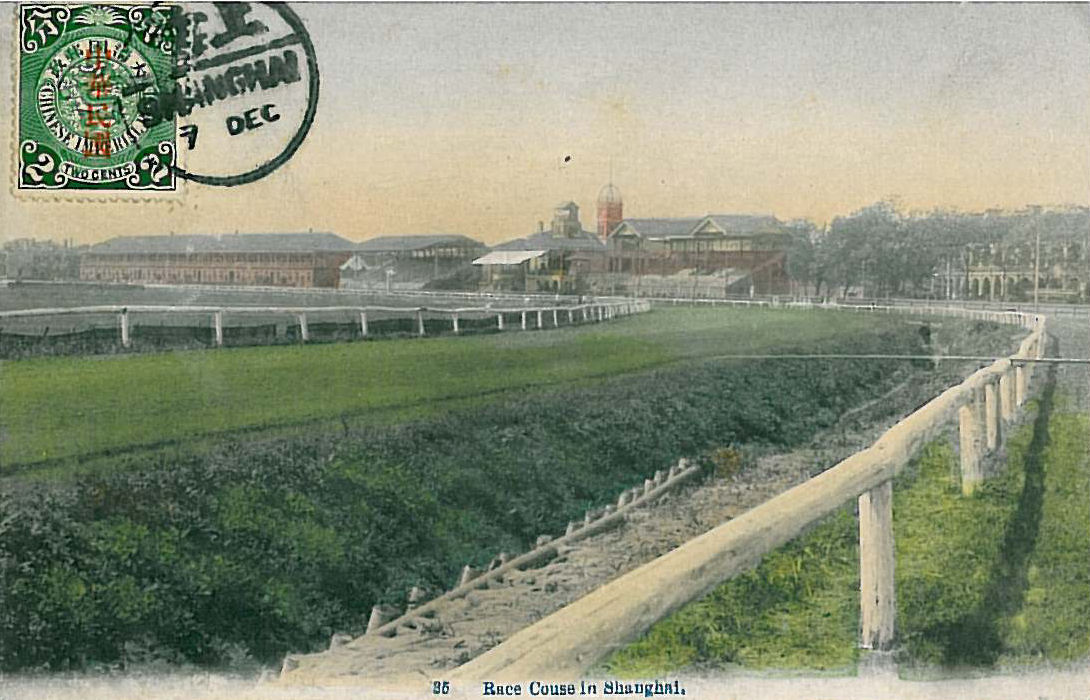
The Racecourse, as depicted on a postcard, c. 1903–1912.

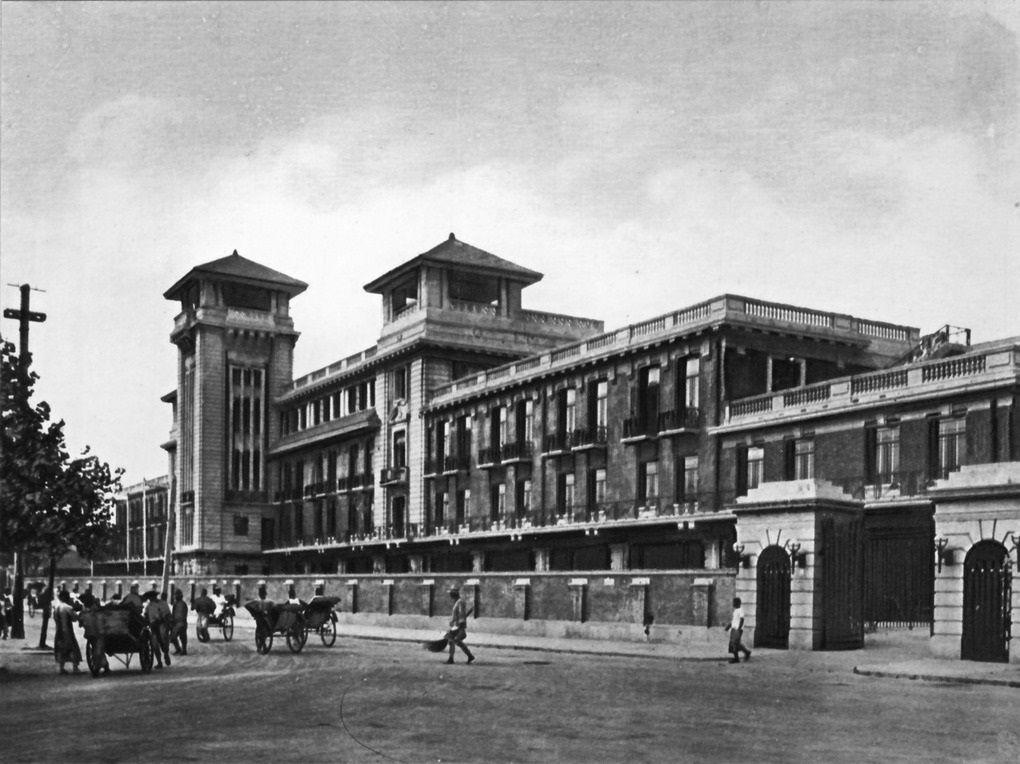
The back of the public stand and the administration building of the Shanghai Race Club

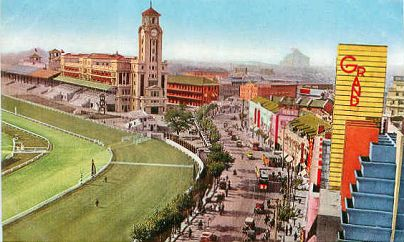
The Shanghai Racecourse in its heyday, as depicted on a pre-1945 postcard, viewed from Nanjing Road. The distinctive club house building is at centre left.

The Race Committee of the International Recreation Club (also called the Shanghai Recreation Fund) organised its first race meet in 1848. In 1850, five founding directors (W. Hogg, T.D. Gibb, Langley, W. W. Pakin and E. Webb) obtained a permanent lease over land at the corner of Honan Road and Nanking Road and built the first racecourse (known as the "Old Park"). The Race Club was formed the same year, and the first race meet was held the next year.

By 1861, the Race Club had 25 members. In 1854, the Old Park was sold at a profit, and the racecourse was enlarged and moved west to the intersection of Chekiang Road and Nanking Road (known as the "New Park"). The influx of refugees fleeing the Taiping Revolution rebels caused a sharp rise in city centre property prices in Shanghai. In 1862, with funds realised from sale of the old racecourse and sports ground, the Race Club was able to purchase even larger grounds further to the west, and construct the third (and last) Shanghai Racecourse. The land enclosed by the race track was sold to the Recreation Club for use as sports grounds. In 1910, the Recreation Club purchased a controlling share of the racecourse at Kiang-wan (now Jiangwan) (which was renamed the International Recreation Ground), and thereafter became the main rival to the Race Club.

The Race Club prospered from the influx of migrants into Shanghai in the early 20th century and the sale of hugely popular raffle tickets from 1908. By 1938, it had purchased all of the assets of its former parent, the Shanghai Recreation Club (which had lost its major source of revenue when the Kiang-wan Racecourse was ransacked by invading Japanese troops), including the sport field surrounded by the racecourse.

The club's activities were affected by the Second Sino-Japanese War and the Chinese Civil War. Upon the outbreak of the Pacific War in 1941, Japanese forces occupied the Race Club, but racing resumed in December 1941 and continued regularly until August 1945. The facilities were briefly used by US forces at the end of the war in 1945. However, due to public outcry about this vestige of colonialism in central Shanghai and the reputation of the racecourse as a gambling den, the government did not permit race meetings to be resumed. From 1946, the Republic of China government began negotiations with the Race Club to resume the racecourse. In 1947, in the midst of negotiations with the government over acquisition of the racecourse, the Club incorporated as three companies, registered in Hong Kong, which respectively held various parts of the club's buildings and facilities; the Recreation Club was also nominally maintained, holding the sports ground surrounded by the race track. Negotiations to exchange the racecourse for a larger plot of suburban land to build a new racecourse never concluded due to the intervention of the Civil War.

After the Communist takeover of Shanghai in 1949, the Trustees of the Shanghai Recreation Fund wrote to the new Communist administration to voluntarily hand over the properties of the Recreation Club, including the sports ground at the centre of the Racecourse. Because the Race Club and the Recreation Club had by now effectively become one, the government waited until the next year to officially "receive" the properties of both the Race Club and the Recreation Club at the Racecourse. The Racecourse was placed under military administration on 31 May 1951. The land occupied by the Racecourse was resumed by the government, the club's buildings remained in its hands, but it had to pay land tax. In September, the government began reconstruction of the race course as People's Park and People's Square. As the Club still could not organise races, it did not have any significant income, and by 1954 owed large amounts of land tax and staff salary. The club had no choice but to hand over all of its properties to the government to pay these debts.

On 31 May 1954, the government took over all of the club's buildings. The club house became, first, the Shanghai Museum, and later, the Shanghai Library. A number of other buildings were subsequently built and rebuilt on the site of the race course and club buildings. In 1997, Shanghai Library moved out to Huaihai Road, and the Shanghai Art Museum moved into the former club house. The Shanghai Art Museum moved out in 2012 to become the China Art Museum in 2012, and the former clubhouse building became the home of the Shanghai History Museum in 2018, which had been left without a base due to redevelopment of its former site since 1999.

== Membership ==
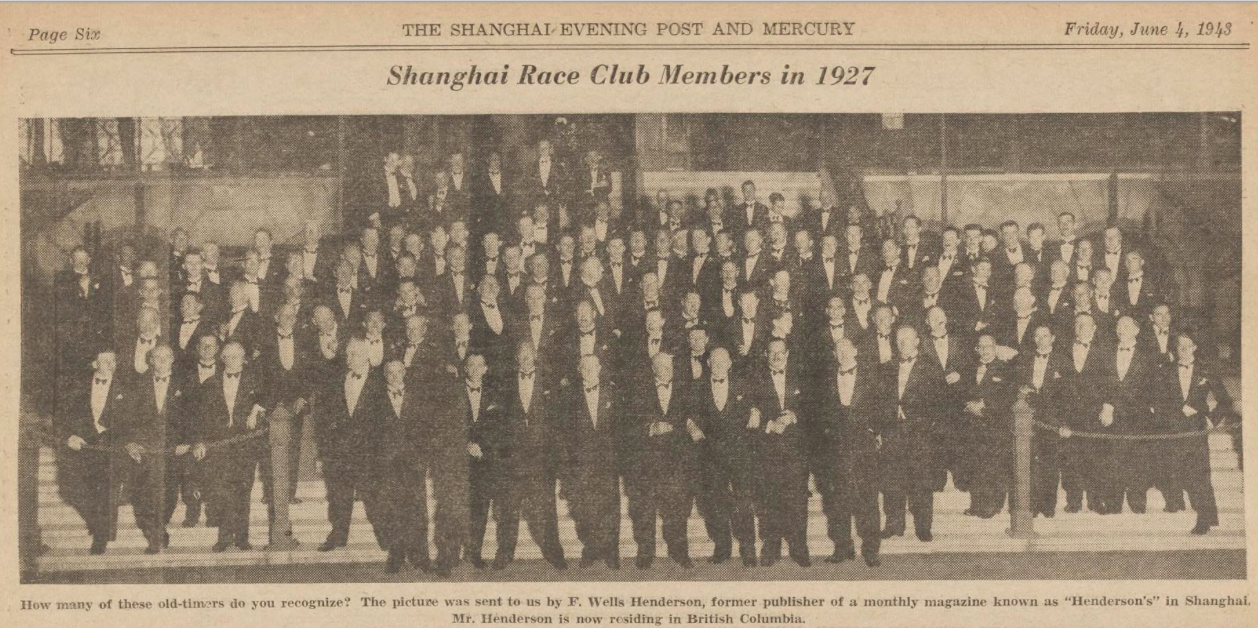
Members of the Shanghai Race Club in 1927

At first, membership of the Race Club was restricted to foreign (non-Chinese) residents over the age of 21. A membership committee of 9 to 11 people would vote on each application. A unanimous approval is required for the application to succeed. If there is one disapproval vote, the application is held over until the next meeting. If there are two disapproval votes, the candidate is required to re-apply after a certain time period. If there are three disapproval votes, then the application fails and the candidate is not permitted to re-apply. It was not until 1908 that select Chinese nationals were permitted to join as honorary members, associate members or social members. By 1908, the Race Club had 320 full members and 500 other members. Monthly fees were 10 Imperial yuan for all membership types, but membership privileges differed significantly. Non-full members could only participate in race meets on festival days. Chinese race-goers were permitted to enter the grounds from 1909.

== Racedays and gambling ==
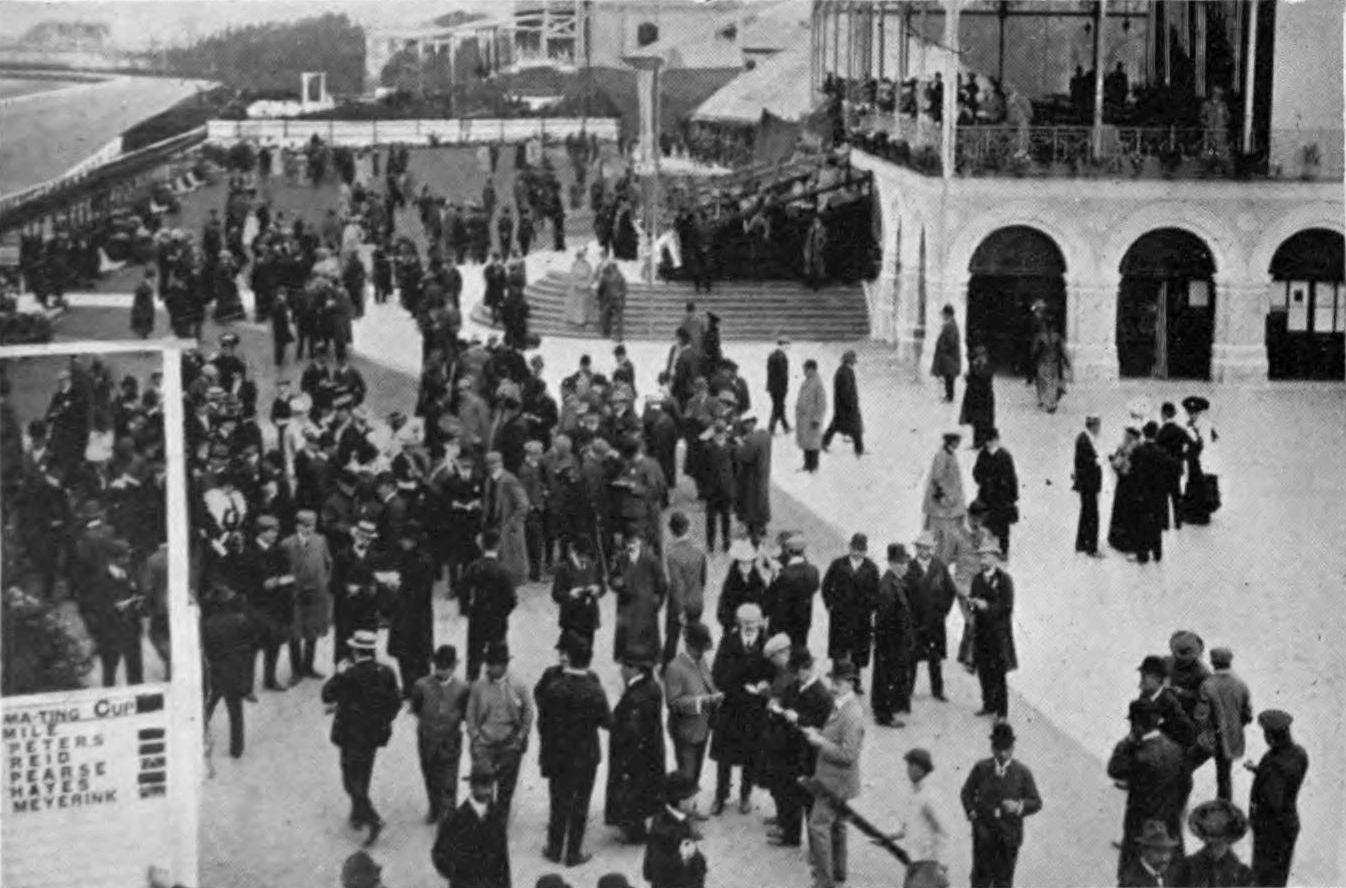
Shanghai Racecourse on a race day, c. 1908.

Between 1863 and 1919, there were two meetings each year: the Spring race days occurred in late April and early May, and the Autumn race days were in late October and early November. Each meeting was for four days. The two race meetings were described as "The Grand Festivals of Shanghai". From 1920 onwards, further preliminary race days were added, and there were occasional additional races on weekends and holidays.

Betting was always a feature of the Shanghai Racecourse. Prior to 1909, this primarily occurred via bookmakers who set up stalls at the course. After 1909, the sale of raffle tickets were introduced, and quickly outstripped betting on horses as the primary source of revenue for the Shanghai Race Club. Horse racing-themed raffle tickets issued by the Race Club were sold across China. Purely a game of chance and not requiring any knowledge of racing, the raffles were very accessible and proved extremely popular with Chinese residents, and also attracted criticism of the Race Club from social commentators for running essentially a pure gambling scheme.

== Trophies and cups ==
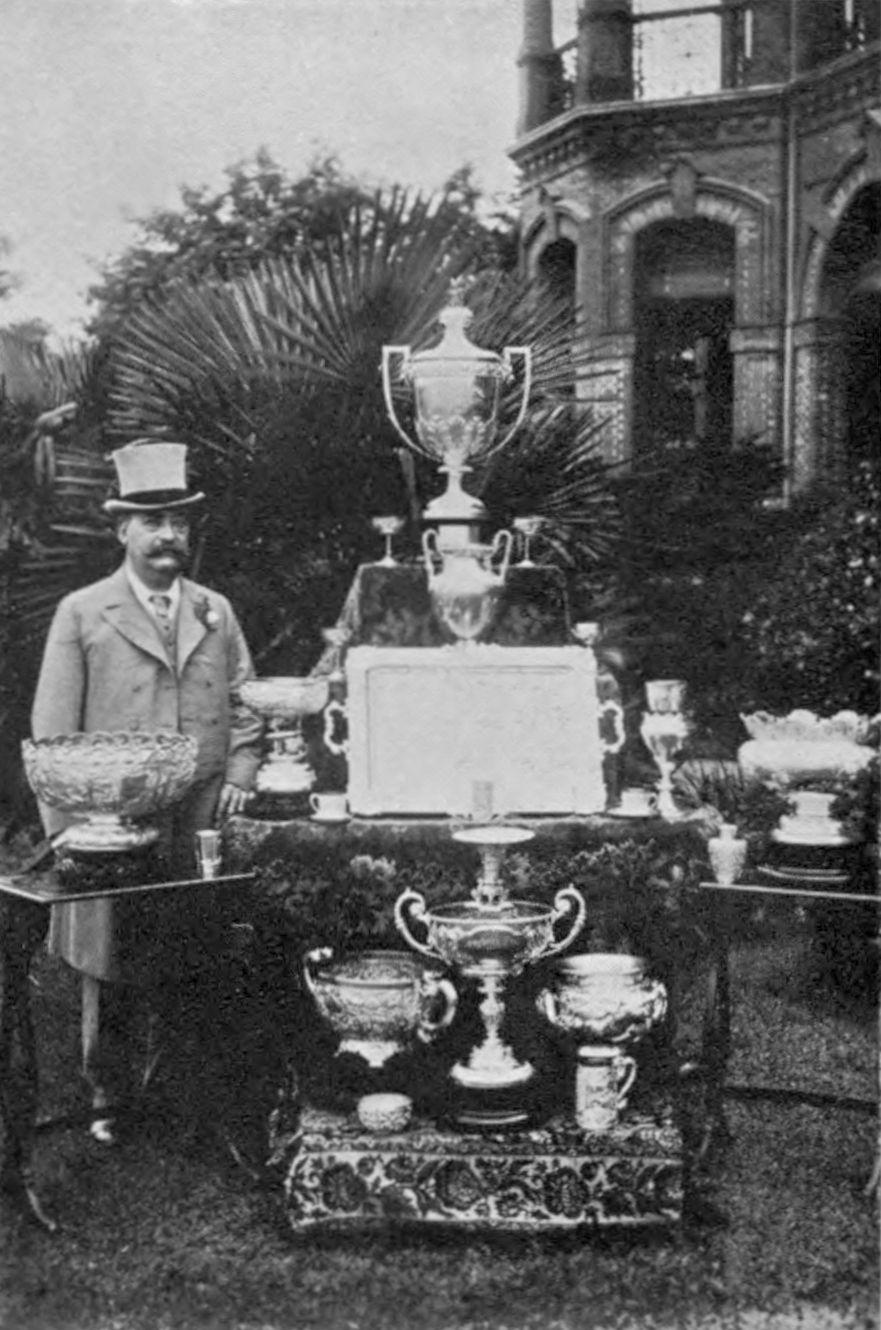
A Shanghai horse owner with his trophies, c. 1908

In the 1860s the most notable trophy was the Champions Stakes, a forced entry race for all winners during the fall and spring race meeting. In 1884 it was renamed the Mafoo and Champions' race. In 1927, it was renamed the Shaforce Challenge Cup and Champions' Stakes.

Champions Day—the day of the Champions' Stakes—was a holiday in Shanghai's International Settlement and drew crowds in excess of 20,000 spectators. The November 12, 1941 Champions Day was the last one under the direction of the British directors of the Shanghai Race Club, just three weeks before the Japanese army occupied the International Settlement. The Japanese occupiers conducted an additional Champions' Stakes in May 1942.

== Notable members ==
- Norwood Allman
- Thomas Chaye Beale (Clerk of the Course)
- C. R. "Chuck" Burkill
- A. W. "Bertie" Burkill (Chairman of the Stewards 1927)
- Sir Paul Chater
- Eric Cumine
- Alexander Dallas
- Frank Dallas
- George Dallas
- John Dent (Scarlet Stables)
- Lambert Dumbar (Bay Stables)
- Edward Ezra
- James Fearon
- A. S. Henchman "Hench"
- J. D. Humphreys
- Dr William Jardine (Tartan Stables)
- Sir Ellis Kadoorie
- Sir John "The Younger" Keswick
- William Keswick
- Ada Law
- Jack Liddell
- Billie Liddell and Vera McBain (We Two Stables)
- John MacGregor (Strath Stables)
- William Mackenzie (E Wo Stables)
- Coll McLean
- Hormusjee Naorojee Mody
- Eric Moller (Moller & Co.)
- Henry Morriss
- David Sassoon "Morn" (Leviathan Stables)
- Sir Victor Sassoon "Eve"
- Major Frank Sutton
- Henry Sylva
- Sir Raymond Toeg "Sir John"
- Edmund Waller ("Fung Wo" Stables)

== Notable horses ==
- Mors aux dents (Eugene de Meriten), winner of the first Champions' Stake (1869)
- Picadilly (Paul Chater), winner of the 1884 Champions Cup won
- Hero (David Sassoon), 3 times successive winner of the Champions' Cup from 1890
- Silky Light (Eric Moller), the fastest Shanghai horse to win the Hong Kong Champion's Cup and Hong Kong Triple Crown
- Wheatcroft (Jack Liddel), three times winner of the Champions' Cup in the 1920s
- Radiant Morn (David Sassoon), five times winner of the Champions' Cup in the 1930s
- Cluniehouse (Robert Aitkenhead), winner of the last Champions' Cup before the Japanese Occupation, 1941.

== Revival ==
The original Shanghai Race Club Limited, registered in Hong Kong, was dissolved in 2009.

A British IT entrepreneur, Byron Constable, purchased brand name rights to "Shanghai Race Club" and started a business called "Shanghai Race Club " in 2008. The business operates in mainland China, and concentrates on showcasing European horse racing as a prestige lifestyle. Constable's Shanghai Race Club also hosts an annual Royal Ascot dinner in Shanghai which is followed by a members tour to attend Royal Ascot Ladies Day. The business does not manage racecourses, nor does it organise race meets.
