= C. Y. Tung Maritime Museum =

Maritime museum in Shanghai, China

Coordinates: 31°12′7.49″N 121°25′49.5″E

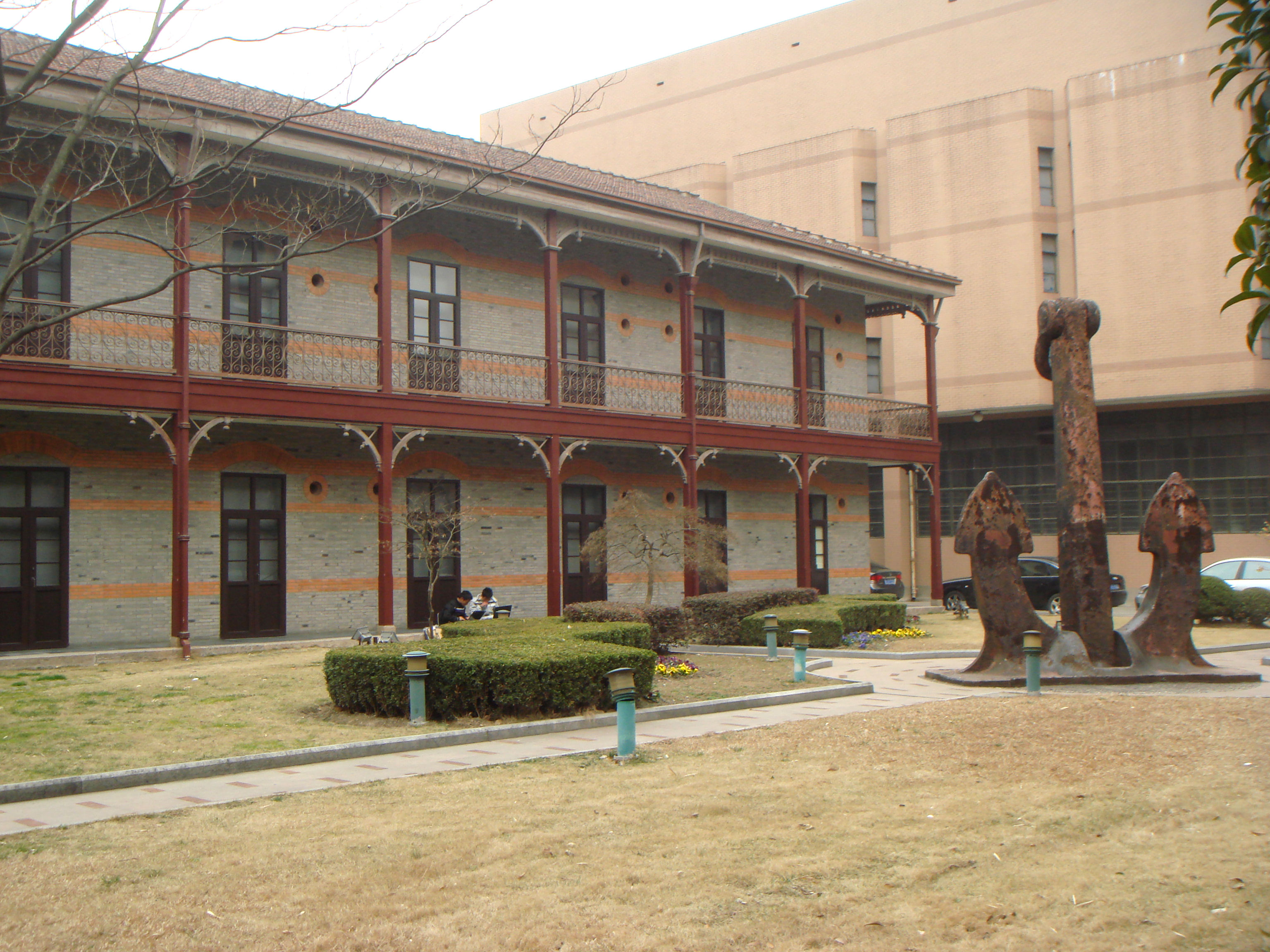
C. Y. Tung Maritime Museum.

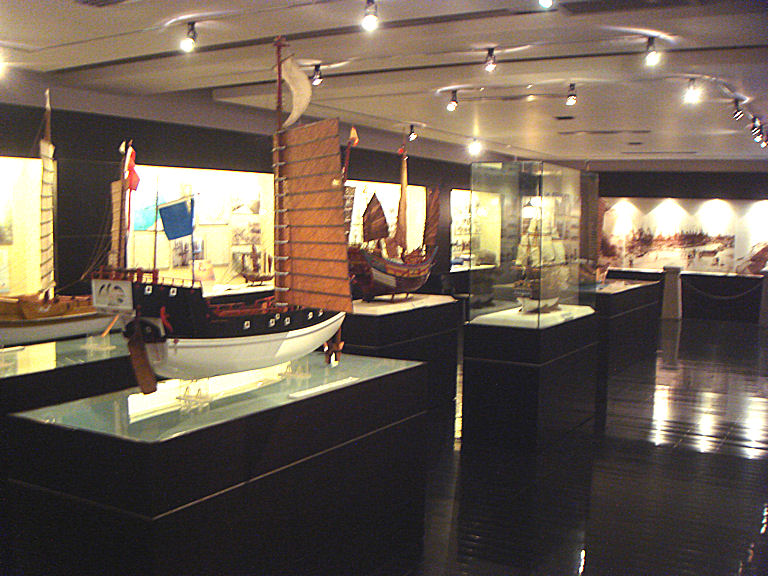
One of the exhibit rooms.

The C. Y. Tung Maritime Museum (董浩云航运博物馆 Dǒng Hàoyún Hángyùn Bówùguǎn) is located in the Shanghai Jiao Tong University in Shanghai, China.

== Overview ==
The museum houses the Chinese Maritime History Gallery and the C. Y. Tung Gallery. The former contains a permanent exhibition of maps, photographs, archival material, maritime trade routes, and artifacts, reflecting China's maritime history since the Neolithic period. The latter portrays the Chinese shipping magnate C. Y. Tung. Especially remarkable is the large collection of ship models ranging from Zheng He's treasure ship to the world's largest ship, the Seawise Giant.

== Location ==
The C. Y. Tung Maritime Museum is located on the Xuhui campus of Shanghai Jiao Tong University. The two-story, western-style building with a central courtyard was built in 1910 as a student residence. The total exhibition space is 600 m^{2} (6,500 sq ft).

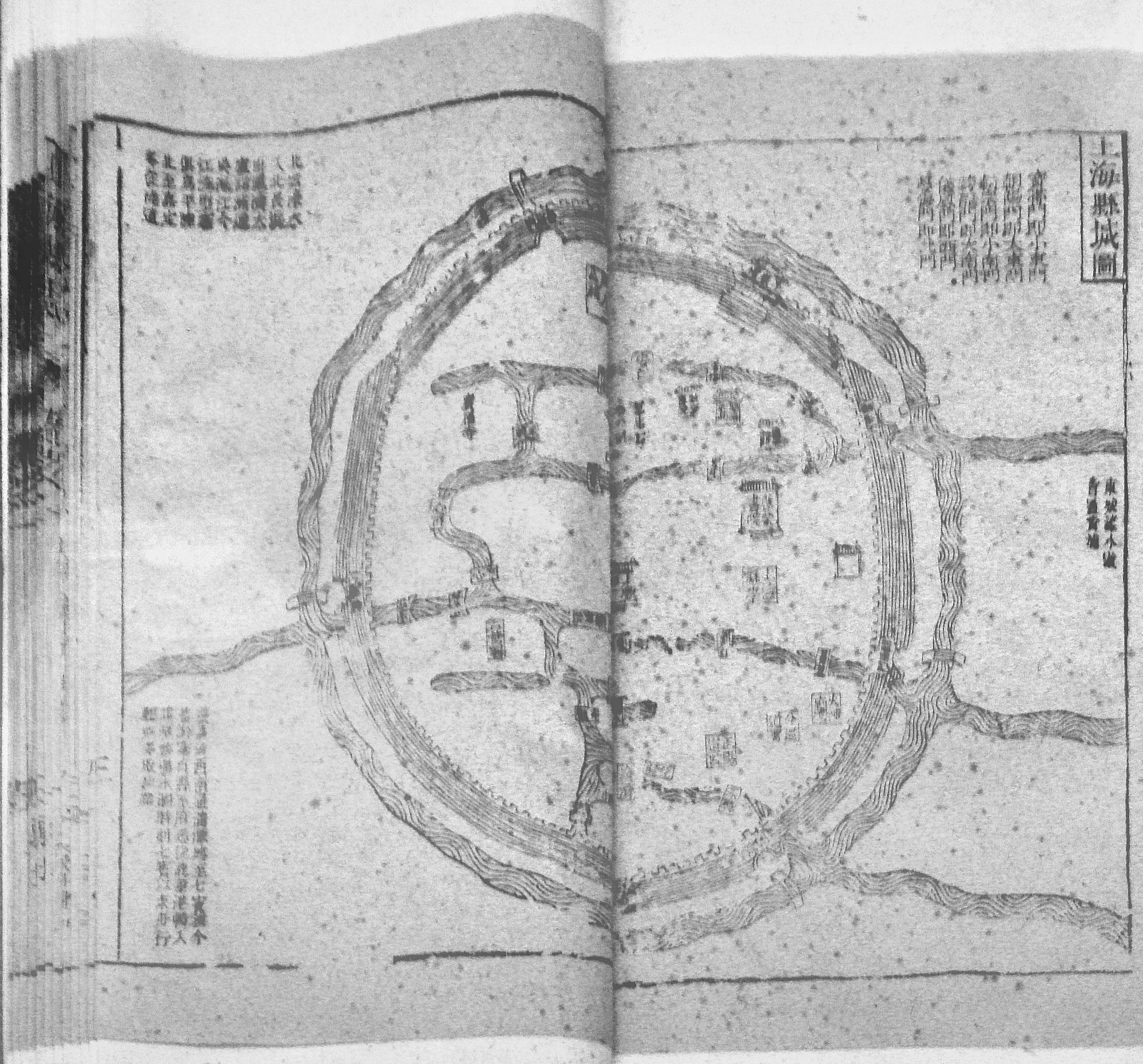
Map of the Old City of Shanghai in Shanghai Xianzhi.

== See also ==
- List of museums in China
