= Dajing Ge Pavilion =

Museum in Shanghai, China

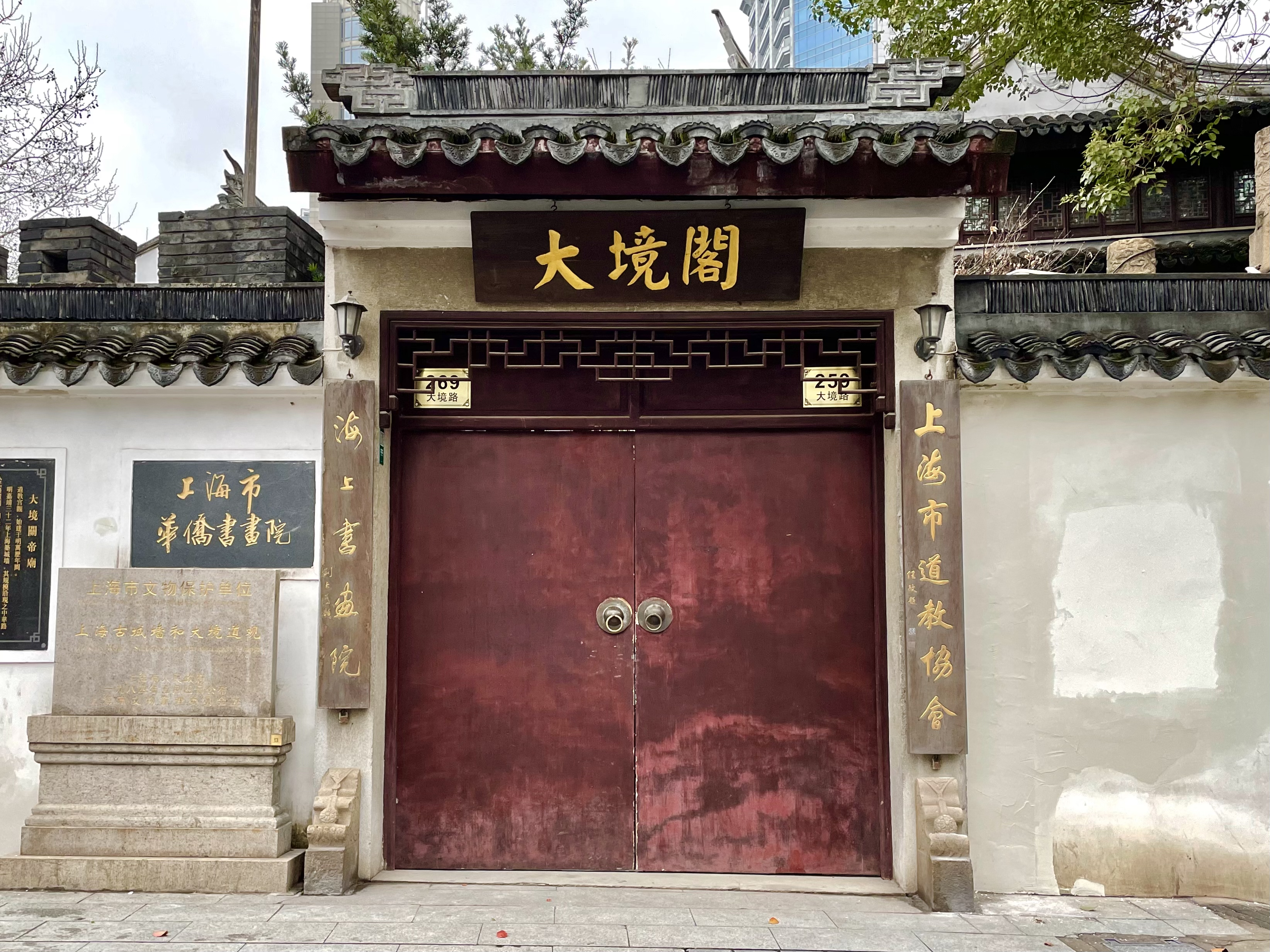
The main entrance of Dajing Ge Pavilion in Shanghai, China

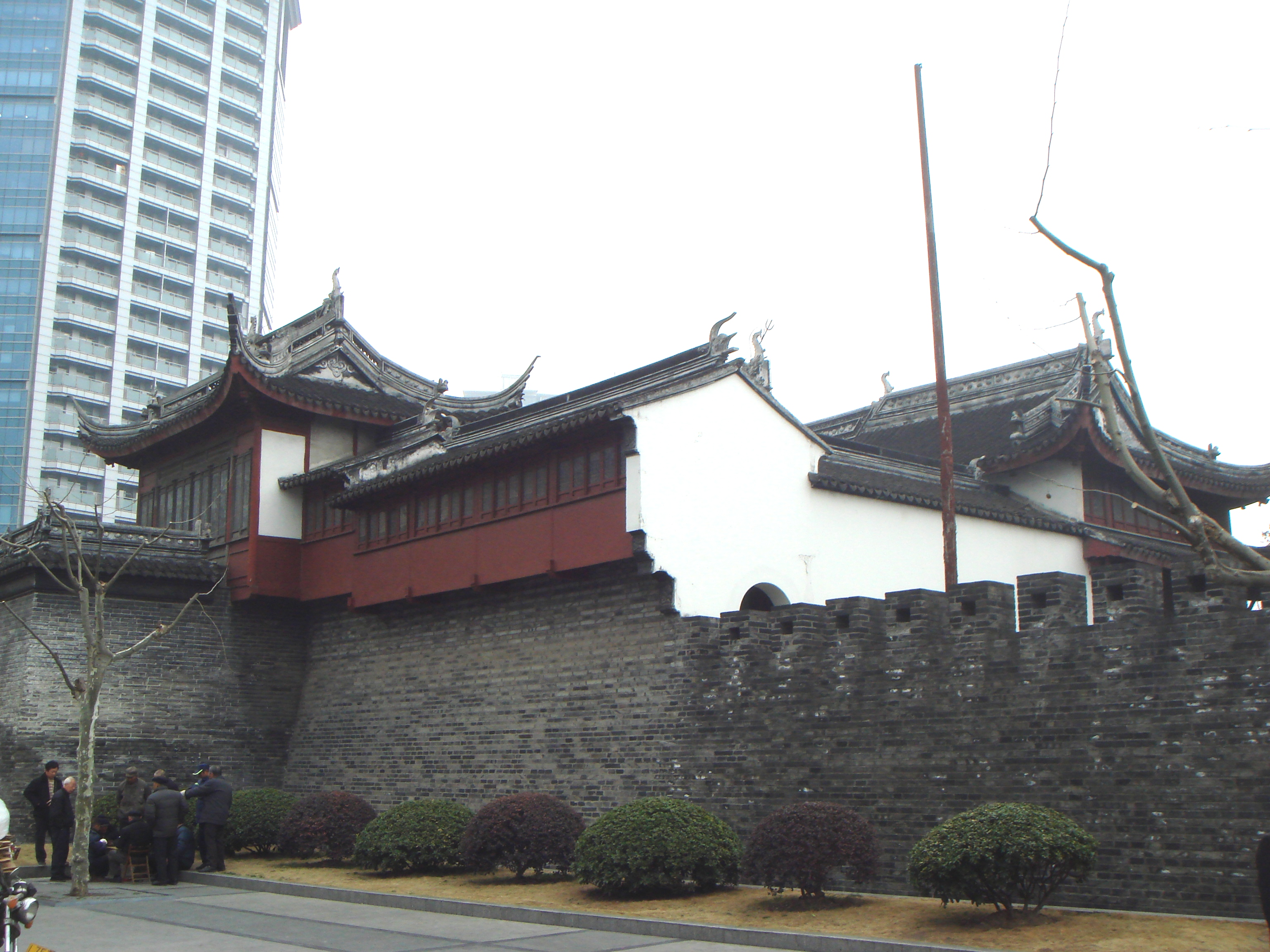
Dajing Ge Pavilion with walls of the Old City of Shanghai

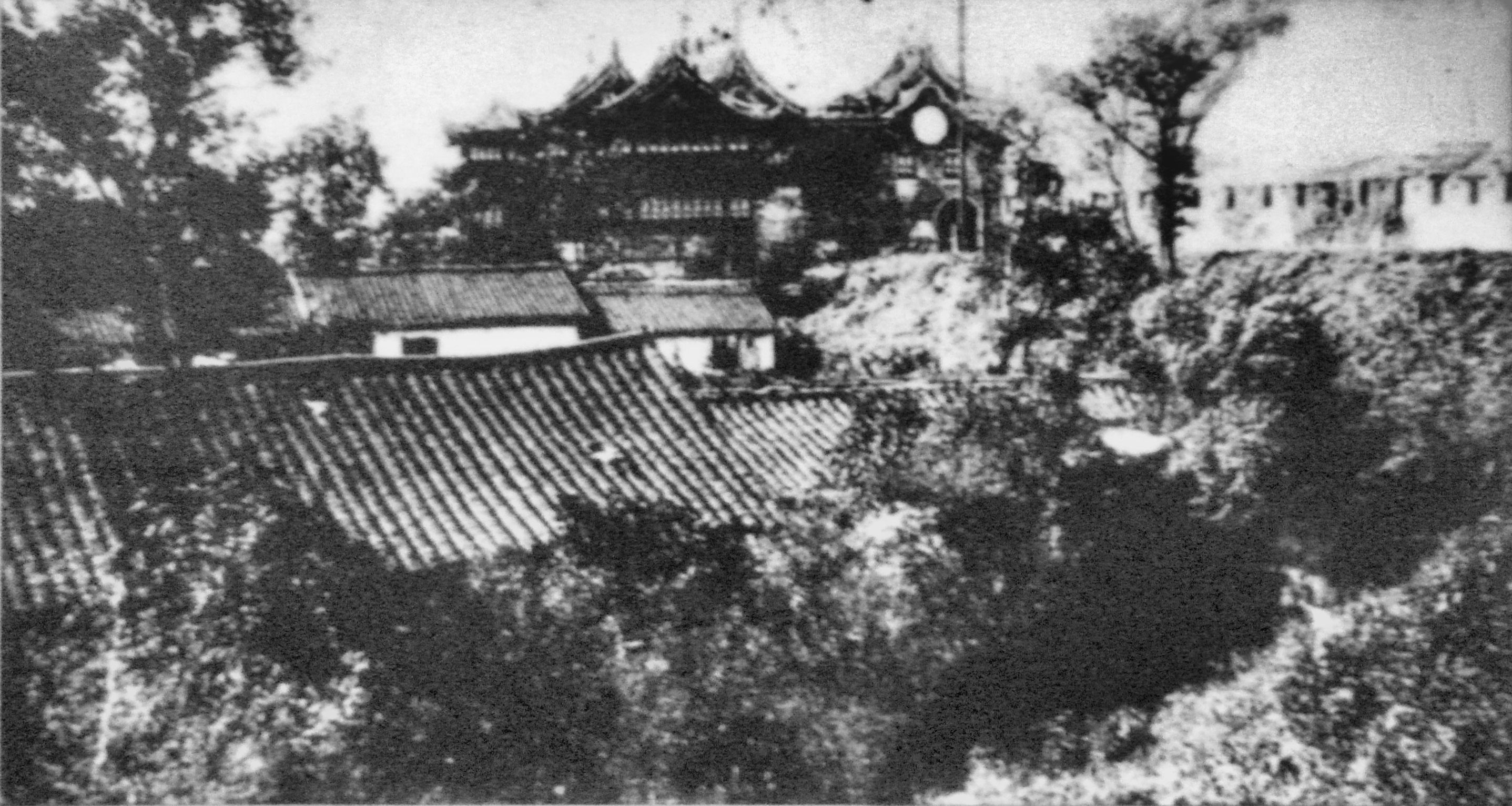
Ancient view of Dajing Ge

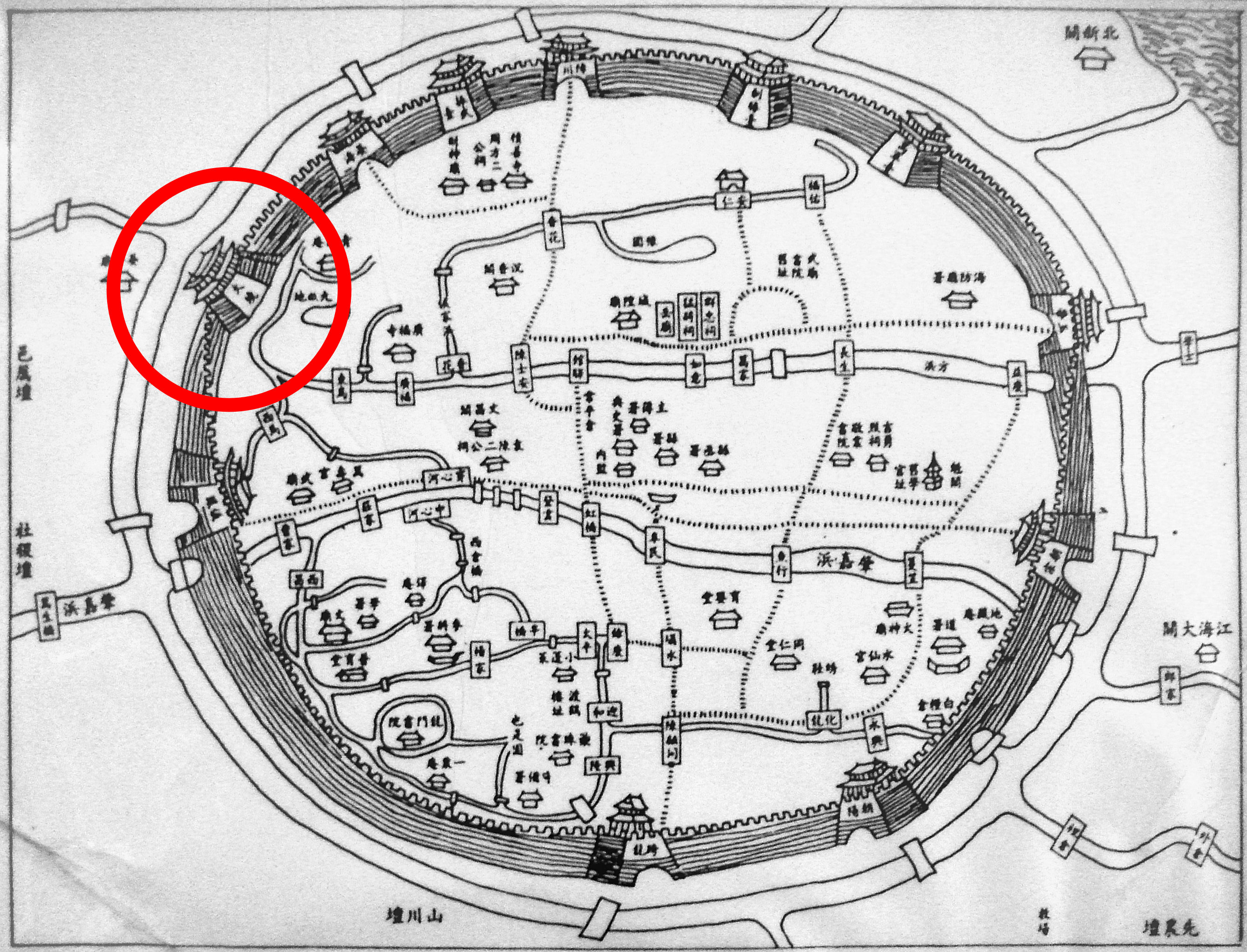
Map of the Old City of Shanghai with the Dajing Ge Pavillon (red circle)

The Dàjìng Gé Pavilion (上海古城墙和大境阁) is a museum and ancient temple of Shanghai, incorporating the last remaining portions of the walls of the Old City of Shanghai. Most of the walls were dismantled in 1912, and today only this portion remains.

In 1959 the Dajing Ge Pavilion was listed as a cultural relic and put under municipal protection. It was renovated in 1995, and then opened to the public.

The building houses a temple and a small museum with photographs of ancient Shanghai (上海老城厢史迹展).

== Images ==
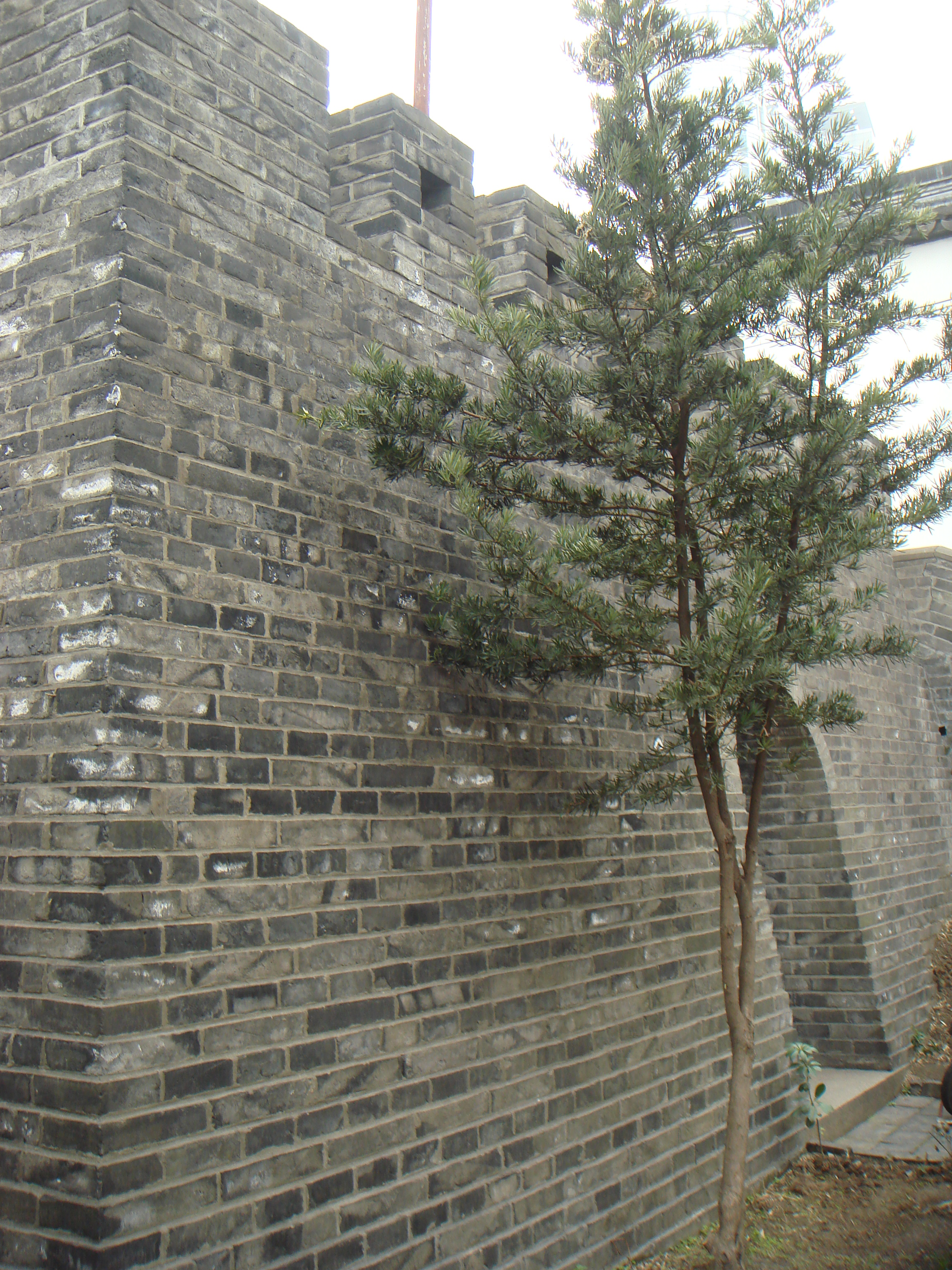
Dajing Ge wall

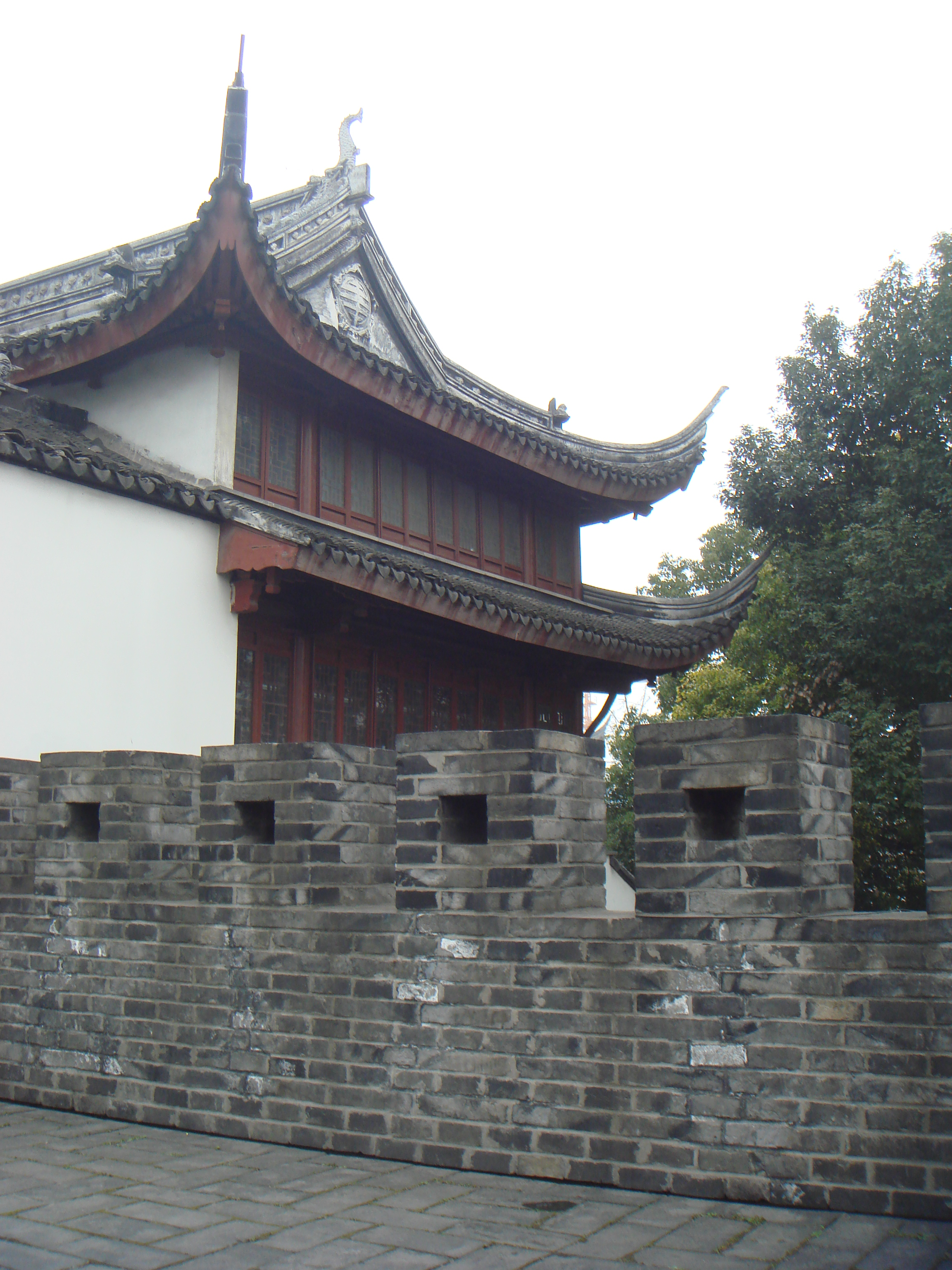
Dajing Ge ramparts

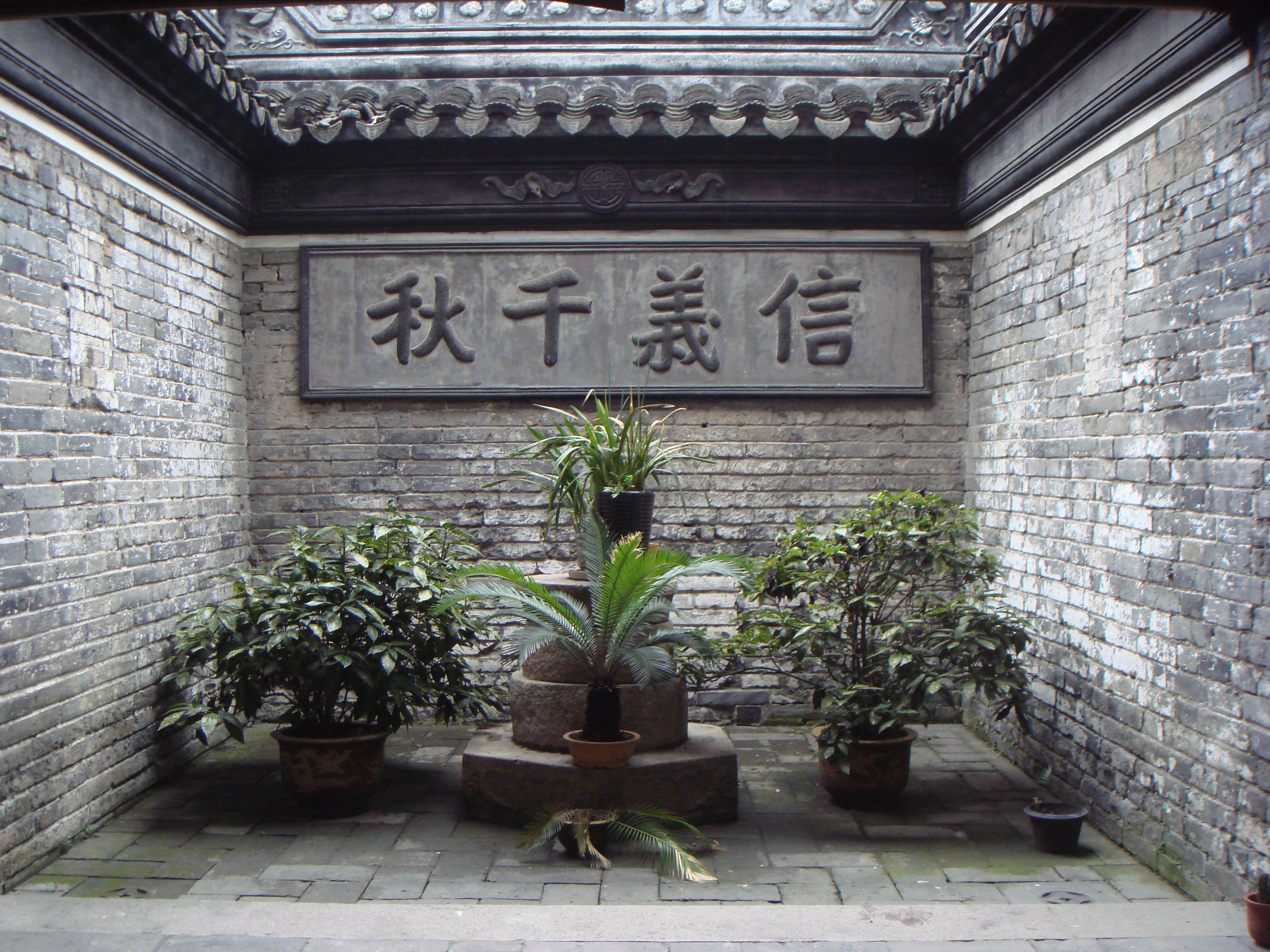
Dajing Ge internal tower

== Museum exhibits ==
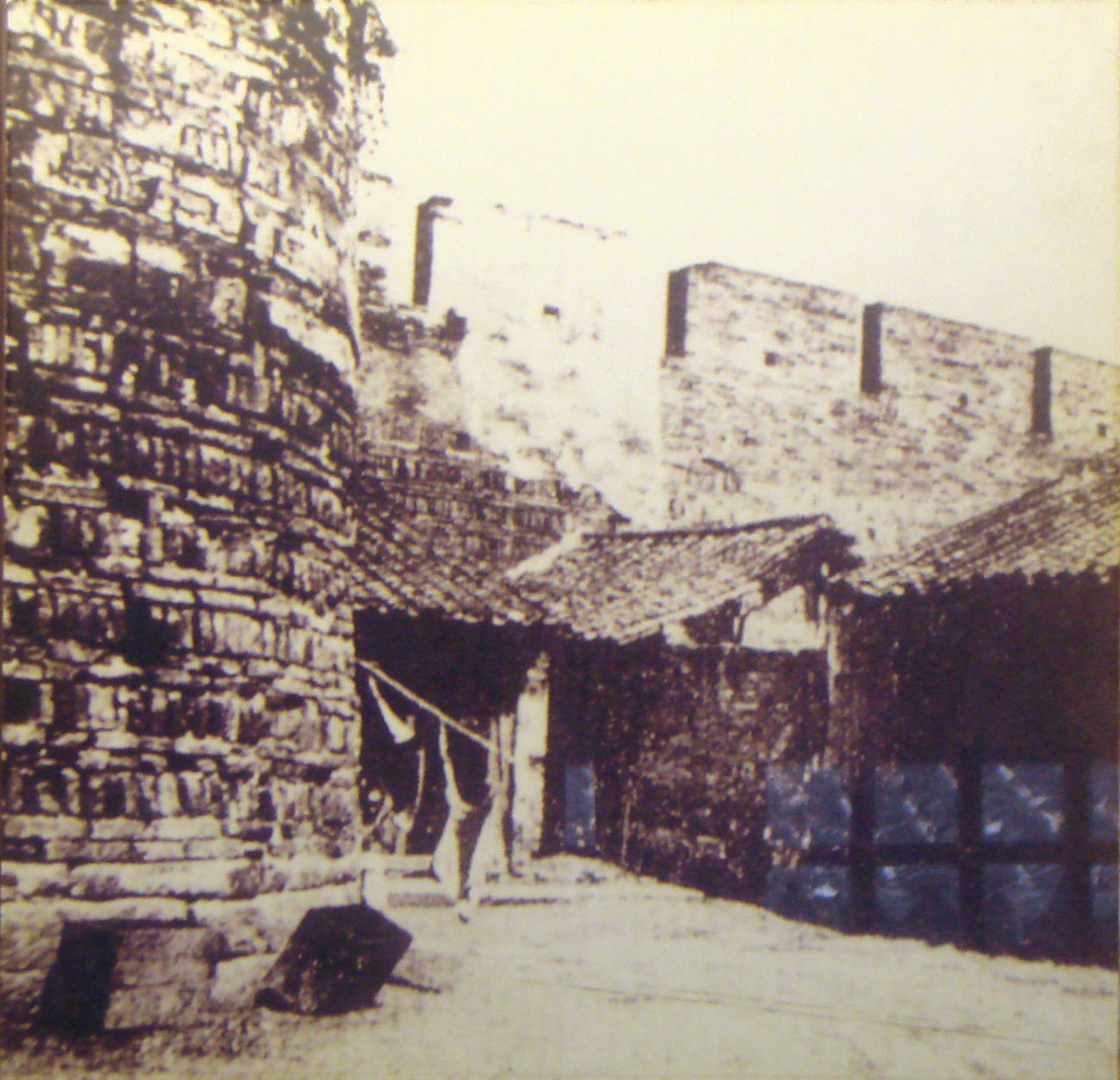
Picture of the old city

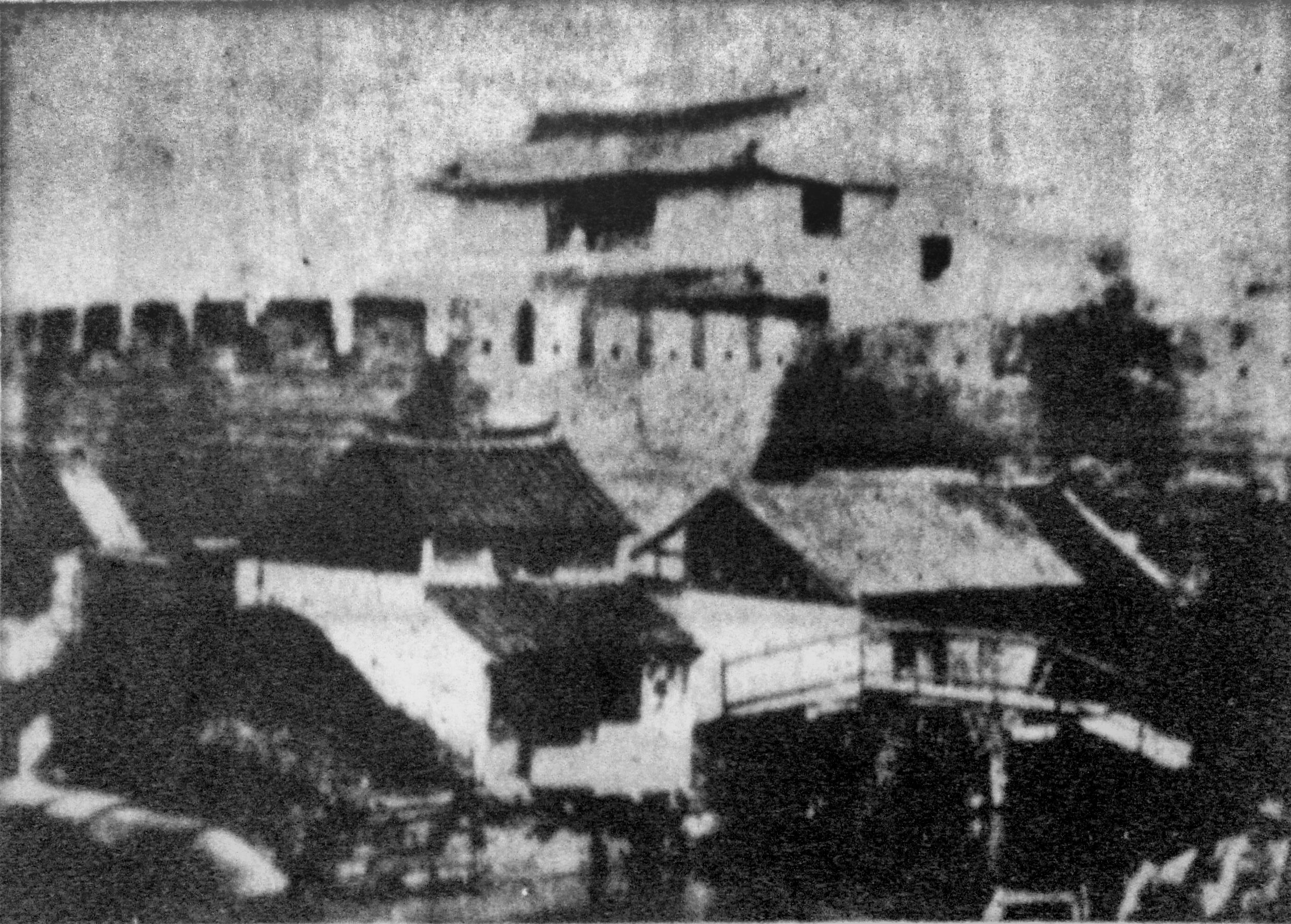
Laoxi gate (老西门) of the Old City

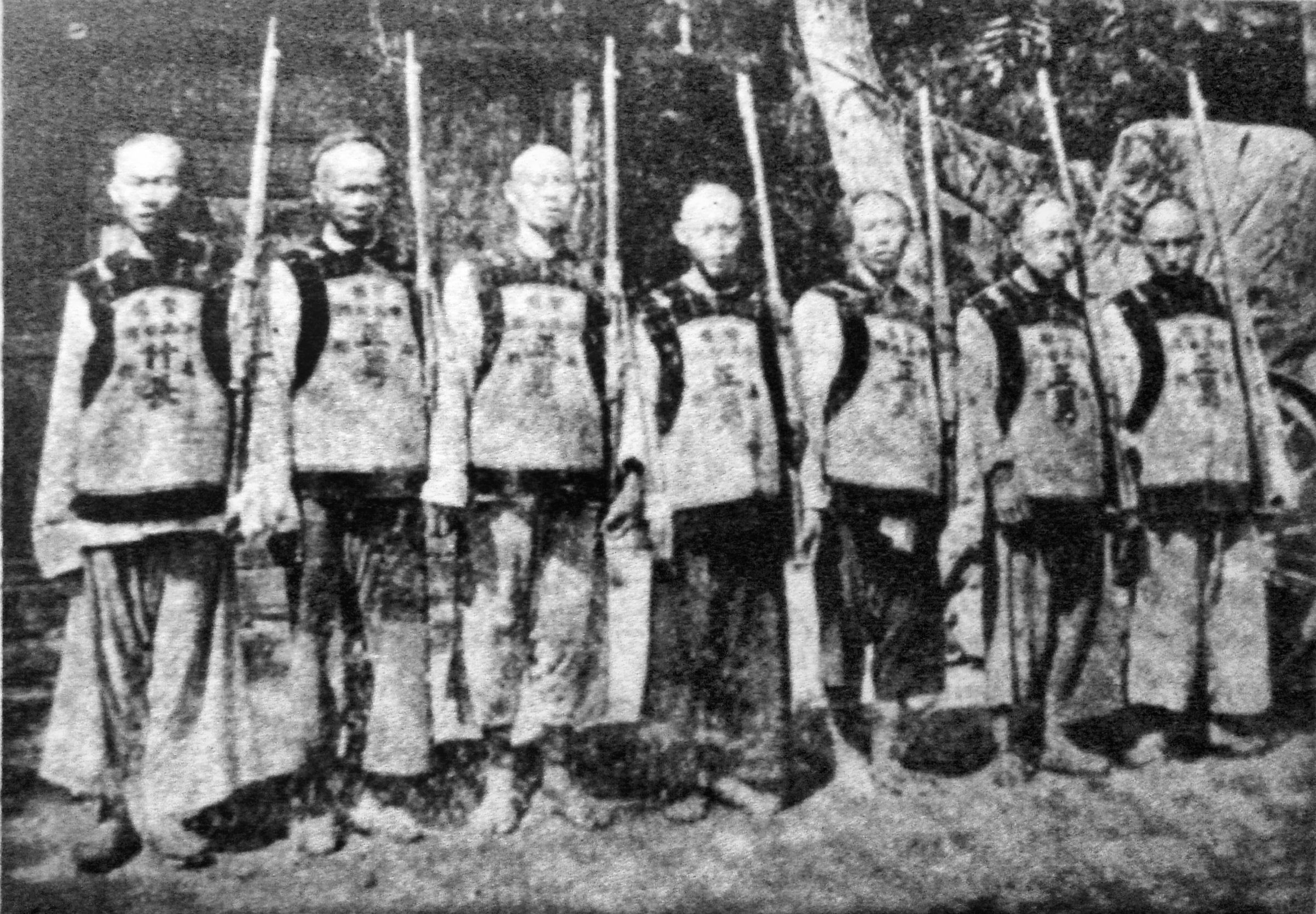
Guards of Shanghai Old City

Address: Dajing Lu 239, Huangpu (黄浦区大境路239号)

== Notes ==
31.2265°N 121.4788°E
