= Old City (Shanghai) =

Traditional urban core of Shanghai

Coordinates: 31.225°N 121.485°E

The Old City of Shanghai (Chinese: 上海老城厢; pinyin: Shànghǎi Lǎo Chéngxiāng; Shanghainese: Zånhae Lo Zenshian), also formerly known as the Chinese city, is the traditional urban core of Shanghai. Its boundary was formerly defined by a defensive wall. The Old City was the county seat for the old county of Shanghai. With the advent of foreign concessions in Shanghai, the Old City became just one part of Shanghai's urban core, but continued for decades to be the seat of the Chinese authority in Shanghai. Notable features include the City God Temple, which is located in the center of the Old City and is connected to the Yuyuan Garden. With the exception of two short sections, the walls were demolished in 1912, and a broad circular avenue built over the former wall and moat: the southern half was named the "Zhonghua Road" and the northern half the "Minguo Road" (together making up "Zhonghua Minguo", or "Republic of China" in Chinese) (the northern half was renamed "Renmin Road" ("People's Road") in 1950 by the new Communist government of Shanghai).

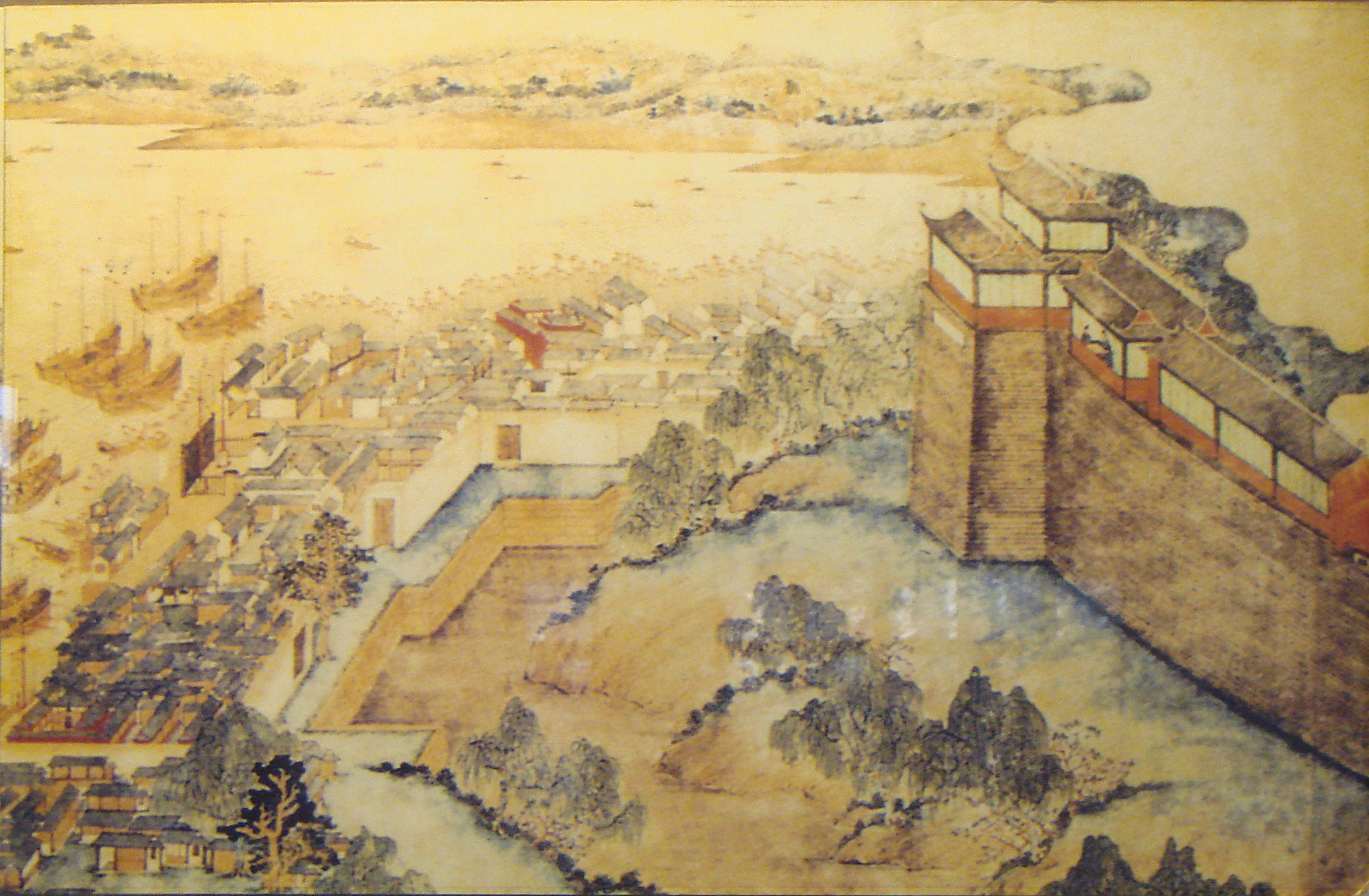
A 17th-century painting showing the city wall of the Old City of Shanghai and the river port outside the wall

The Old City was for decades essentially coterminous with the old Nanshi District, which is now part of Huangpu District.

== Fortifications ==
There may have been some sort of defensive works around the county seat of Shanghai from the 11th century. The city wall, which survived until the 20th century and parts of which remain to this day, was, however, built in 1554 during the Ming dynasty, in order to protect the town from raids by Japanese pirates. It measured 10 metres (33 ft) high and 5 kilometres (3.1 mi) in circumference. In addition to the local garrison, the city was surrounded by Qing army posts at Jiangning (Nanjing), Jingkou (Zhenjiang), Hangzhou, and Zhapu.

There were originally six land gates (over roads) built into the structure, and three water gates (over canals):

Gates of the Old City of Shanghai
Old City maps	Gate	Images
Map of Shanghai in Shanghai Xianzhi. Map of Shanghai in 1553 (published in 1813). Map of Shanghai (made circa 1860) Map of Shanghai (made circa 1860); Red: Old gates. Blue: Water gates. Green: New gates (1909)
Map of Shanghai in Shanghai Xianzhi. Map of Shanghai in 1553 (published in 1813). Map of Shanghai (made circa 1860) Map of Shanghai (made circa 1860); Red: Old gates. Blue: Water gates. Green: New gates (1909)	Small Northern Gate (小北門 or 拱辰門) (built 1909)	
Map of Shanghai in Shanghai Xianzhi. Map of Shanghai in 1553 (published in 1813). Map of Shanghai (made circa 1860) Map of Shanghai (made circa 1860); Red: Old gates. Blue: Water gates. Green: New gates (1909)	Old Northern Gate 老北門 also: 晏海門 "Gate of the Peaceful Sea"	
Map of Shanghai in Shanghai Xianzhi. Map of Shanghai in 1553 (published in 1813). Map of Shanghai (made circa 1860) Map of Shanghai (made circa 1860); Red: Old gates. Blue: Water gates. Green: New gates (1909)	New Northern Gate 新北門 (built 1860) also: 障川門	
Map of Shanghai in Shanghai Xianzhi. Map of Shanghai in 1553 (published in 1813). Map of Shanghai (made circa 1860) Map of Shanghai (made circa 1860); Red: Old gates. Blue: Water gates. Green: New gates (1909)	New Eastern Gate (新東門, 福佑門) (built 1909)	
Map of Shanghai in Shanghai Xianzhi. Map of Shanghai in 1553 (published in 1813). Map of Shanghai (made circa 1860) Map of Shanghai (made circa 1860); Red: Old gates. Blue: Water gates. Green: New gates (1909)	Small Eastern Gate 小東門 also: 宝帯門 "Gate of the Diamond Belt"	
Map of Shanghai in Shanghai Xianzhi. Map of Shanghai in 1553 (published in 1813). Map of Shanghai (made circa 1860) Map of Shanghai (made circa 1860); Red: Old gates. Blue: Water gates. Green: New gates (1909)	Small Eastern Water Gate 小東門水門 also: 小東門處跨方浜	
Map of Shanghai in Shanghai Xianzhi. Map of Shanghai in 1553 (published in 1813). Map of Shanghai (made circa 1860) Map of Shanghai (made circa 1860); Red: Old gates. Blue: Water gates. Green: New gates (1909)	Great Eastern Gate 大東門 also: 朝宗門 "Gate of Dynastic Ancestors"	
Map of Shanghai in Shanghai Xianzhi. Map of Shanghai in 1553 (published in 1813). Map of Shanghai (made circa 1860) Map of Shanghai (made circa 1860); Red: Old gates. Blue: Water gates. Green: New gates (1909)	Eastern Water Gate 東門水門	
Map of Shanghai in Shanghai Xianzhi. Map of Shanghai in 1553 (published in 1813). Map of Shanghai (made circa 1860) Map of Shanghai (made circa 1860); Red: Old gates. Blue: Water gates. Green: New gates (1909)	Small Southern Gate 小南門 also: 朝陽門 "Gate of the Rising Sun"	
Map of Shanghai in Shanghai Xianzhi. Map of Shanghai in 1553 (published in 1813). Map of Shanghai (made circa 1860) Map of Shanghai (made circa 1860); Red: Old gates. Blue: Water gates. Green: New gates (1909)	Great Southern Gate 大南門 also: 跨龍門 "Gate of the Leaping Dragon"	
Map of Shanghai in Shanghai Xianzhi. Map of Shanghai in 1553 (published in 1813). Map of Shanghai (made circa 1860) Map of Shanghai (made circa 1860); Red: Old gates. Blue: Water gates. Green: New gates (1909)	Small Western Gate (小西門 or 尚文門) (built 1909)	
Map of Shanghai in Shanghai Xianzhi. Map of Shanghai in 1553 (published in 1813). Map of Shanghai (made circa 1860) Map of Shanghai (made circa 1860); Red: Old gates. Blue: Water gates. Green: New gates (1909)	Western Water Gate 西門水門 also: 西門跨肇嘉浜	
Map of Shanghai in Shanghai Xianzhi. Map of Shanghai in 1553 (published in 1813). Map of Shanghai (made circa 1860) Map of Shanghai (made circa 1860); Red: Old gates. Blue: Water gates. Green: New gates (1909)	Old Western Gate Laoximen 老西門 also: 儀鳳門 "Gate of the Virtuous Phoenix"	

A protective moat surrounded the wall, 20 metres (66 ft) wide and 6 metres (20 ft) deep, which was accessed though three "Water Gates" (two in the east, one in the west).

In 1860 a new gate was created, the "New Northern Gate" (新北門 or 障川門). In 1909, three new gates were pierced:

- the Small Western Gate (小西門 or 尚文門)
- the Small Northern Gate (小北門 or 拱辰門)
- the New Eastern Gate (新東門, 福佑門).
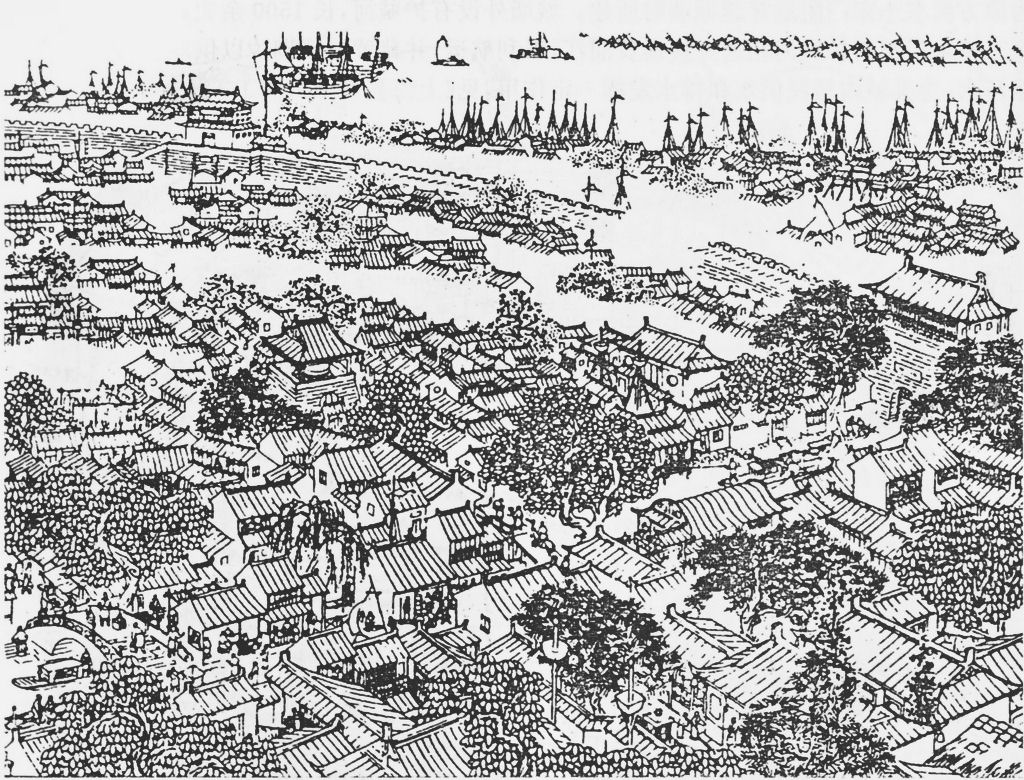
The walled city of Shanghai during the Ming dynasty

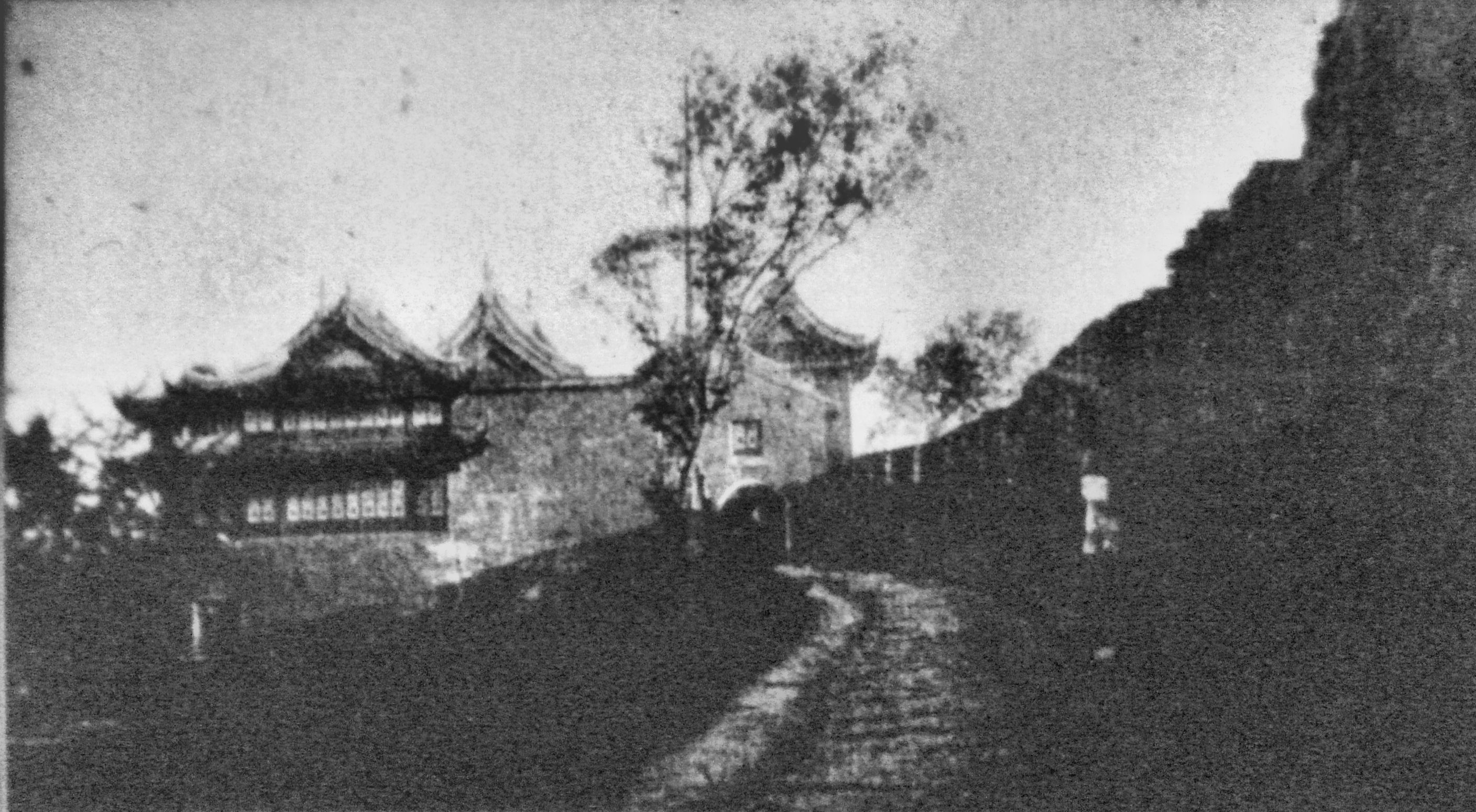
Shanghai walls of the Old City

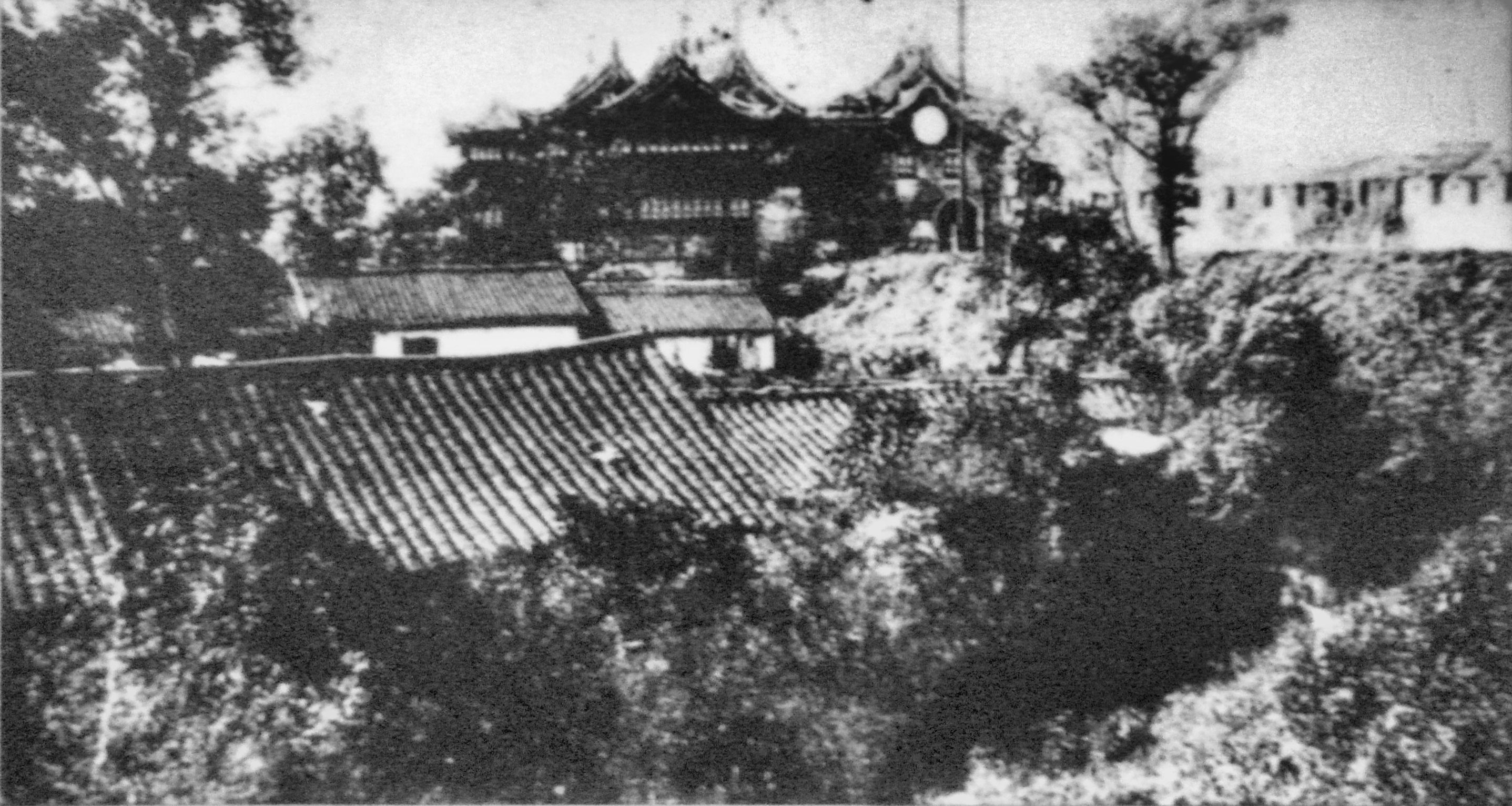
Ancient view of Dajing Ge

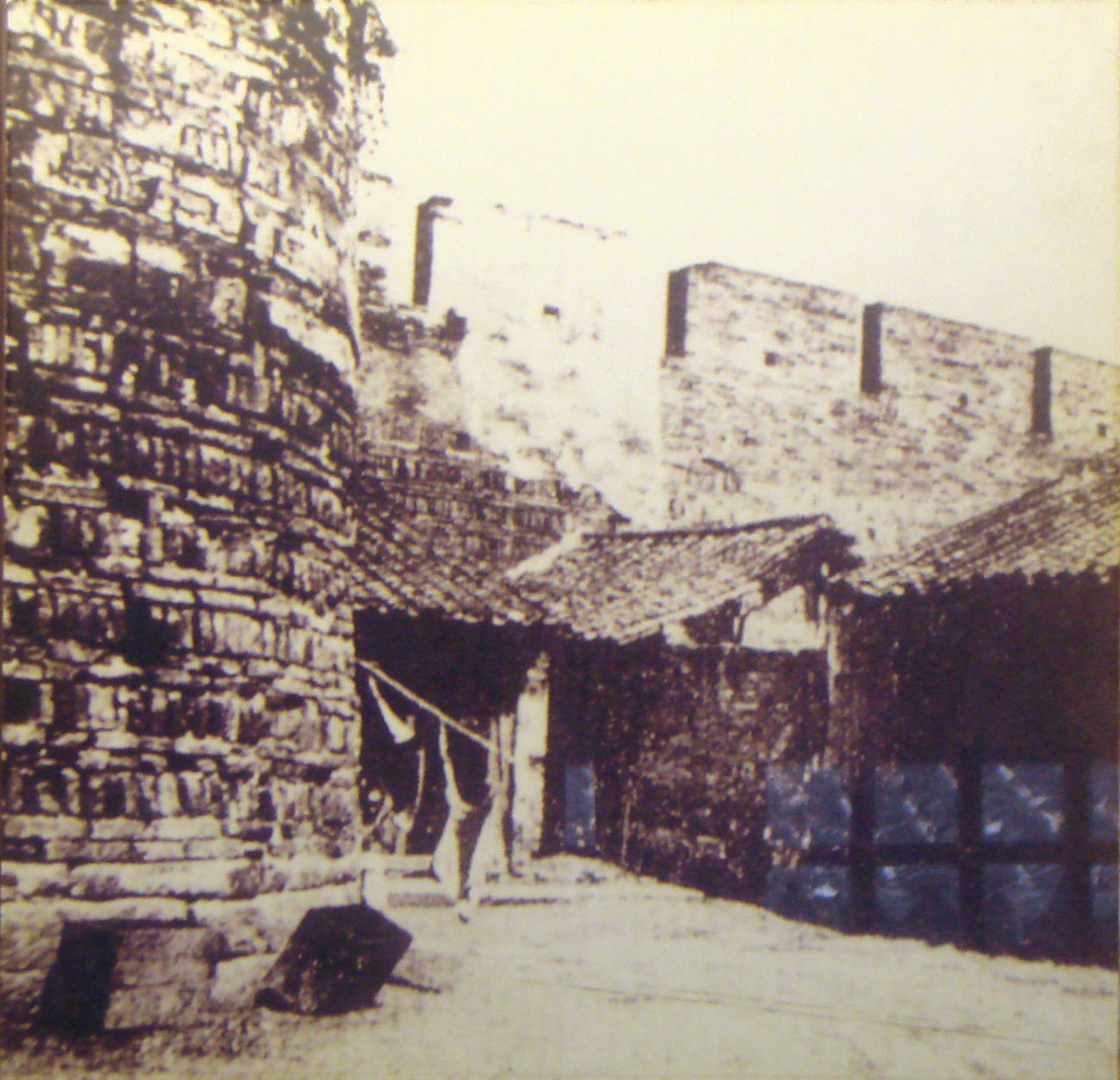
Picture of the old city

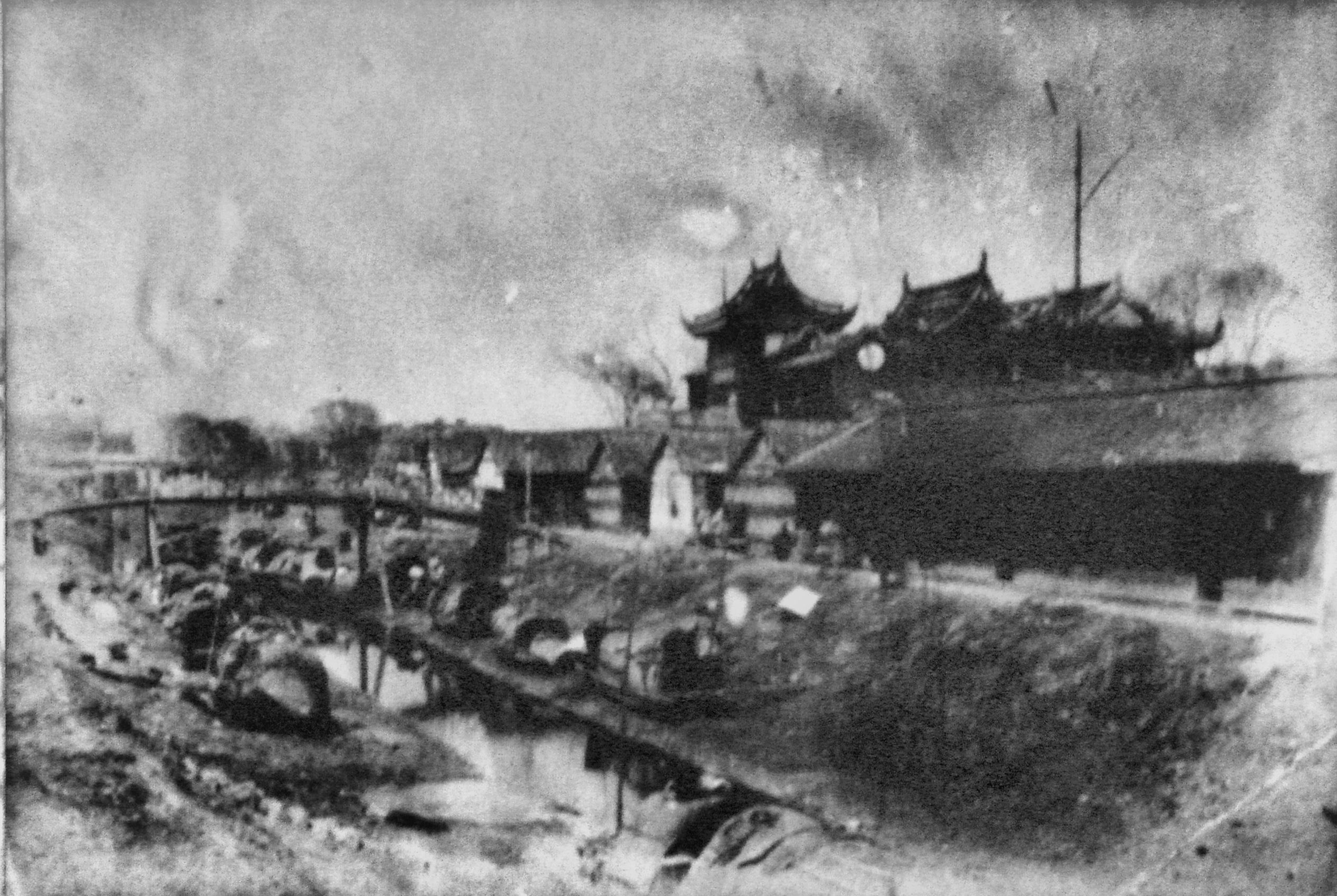
Outside moat of the Old City

The Old City walls were dismantled in 1912 by General Chen Qimei, the new Governor of Shanghai.

Apart from two small preserved sections, the walls were demolished in 1912, and a broad circular avenue built in the place of the wall and moat. The northern half of the circular road was completed in 1913. To celebrate the founding of the Republic of China in 1912, and because the road formed the boundary between the Chinese city and the French Concession, the road was named the Boulevard des Deux Républiques (literally "Boulevard of the Two Republics"), or Fa-Hua Minguo Lu in Chinese (literally "French and Chinese Republics Road"), and often shortened to "Minguo Lu" (or "Republic Road"). In 1914, the southern part of the circular road was completed, and named Zhonghua Lu (literally "China Road"). Together, the customary names of the two roads made up "Zhonghua Minguo", or "Republic of China" in Chinese (the northern half was renamed "Renmin Road" ("People's Road") in 1950 by the new Communist government of Shanghai).

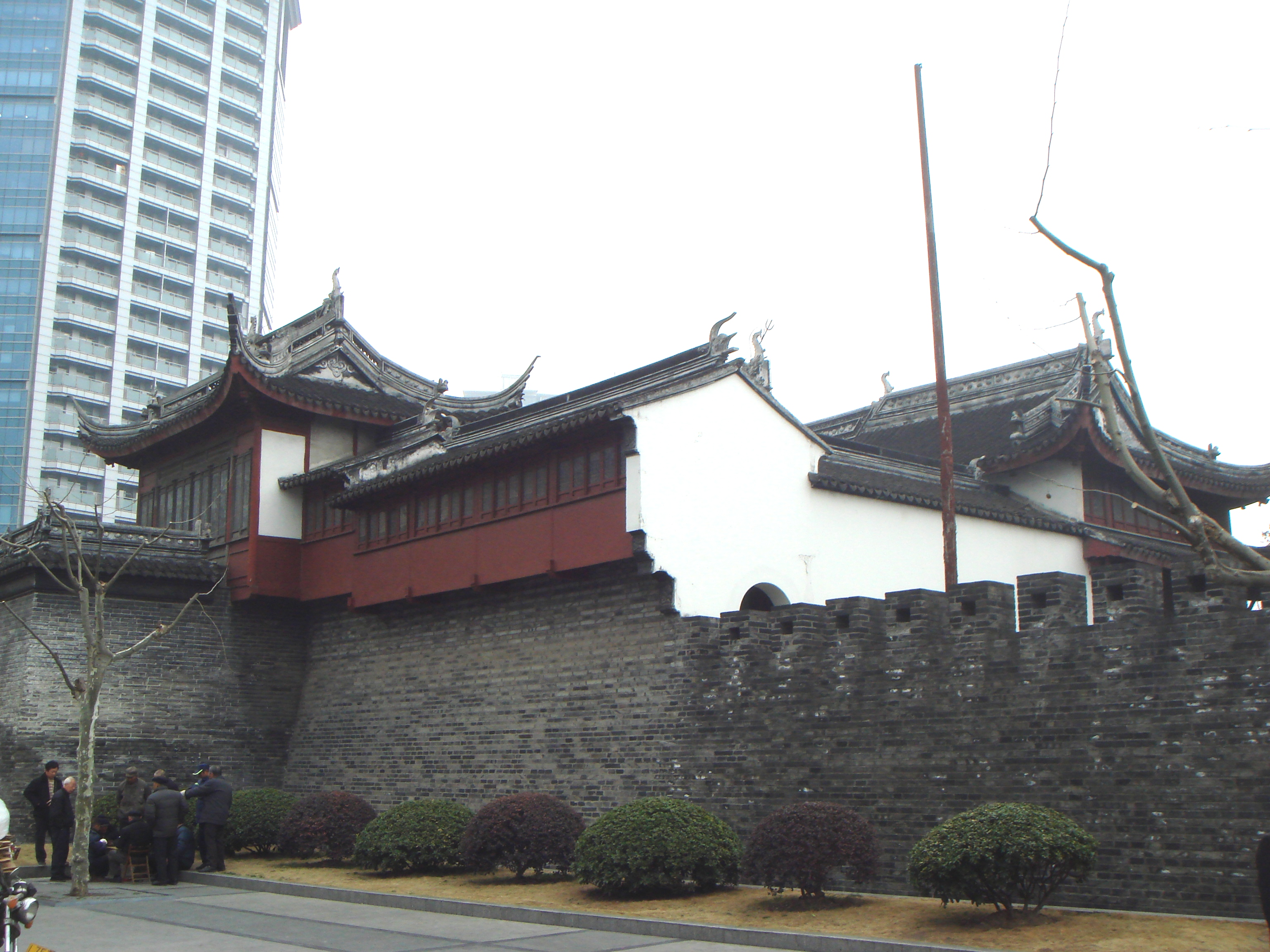
Only remaining wall at the Dàjìng Gé Pavillon

Today only two very small sections remain. The more significant of these is one of the towers (pavilions) over the gate, now the Dajing Ge Pavillon museum.

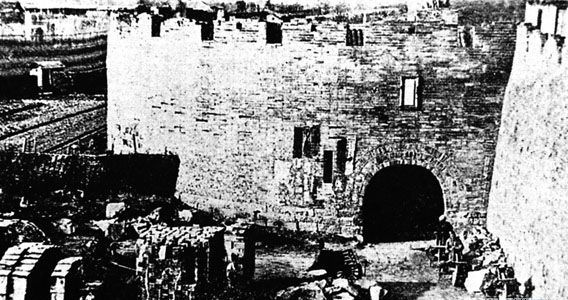
Dismantlement of Old City walls in 1911

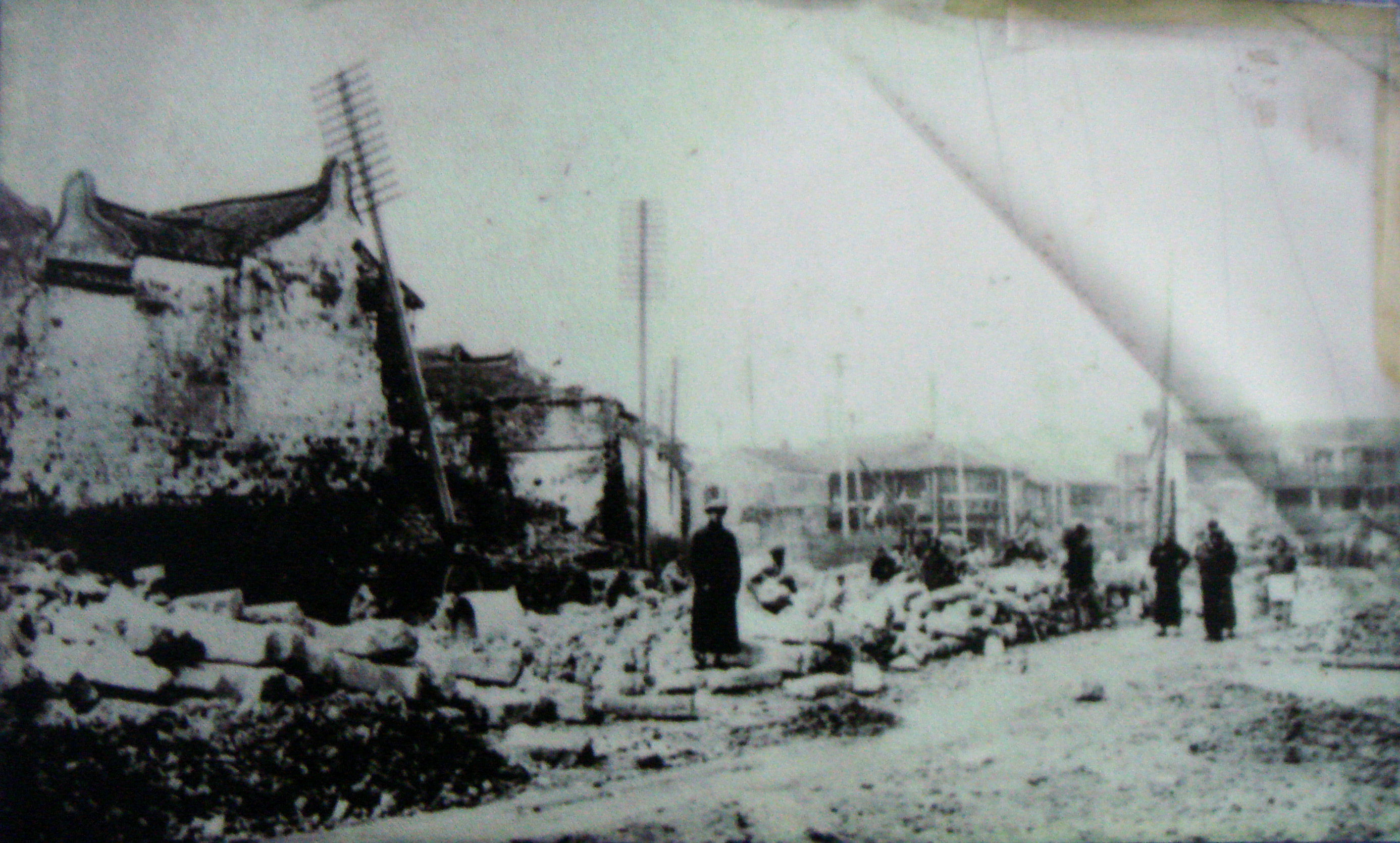
Dismantlement of the Old City walls in 1912

== Old City and foreign concessions ==
After the Opium War in 1842, various foreign concessions were established in Shanghai. The Old City remained under Chinese control, while the foreign concessions to its north and west quickly developed into the new urban areas of Shanghai. The Old City became known to the increasingly cosmopolitan populace as the "Chinese City", or the "Southern City" to the local Chinese, whereas the concessions were called the "Northern City" (北市). Initially, only foreigners could settle in the concessions (though the concessions always had pre-existing Chinese residents), while newly arrived Chinese migrants lived in packed conditions in the Old City, which functioned as a sort of ghetto.

During the Taiping Rebellion in 1853, the Old City was captured by the forces of the Small Swords Society. The Governor of Shanghai Wu Jianzhang fled to the British Concession and had to transfer control of trade to the foreigners in exchange for help in retaking the city. Recognising that a huge stream of refugees was fleeing into the foreign concessions, not only from the Chinese areas of Shanghai but also from the surrounding region, from 1854 the Chinese were permitted to move into the foreign concessions.

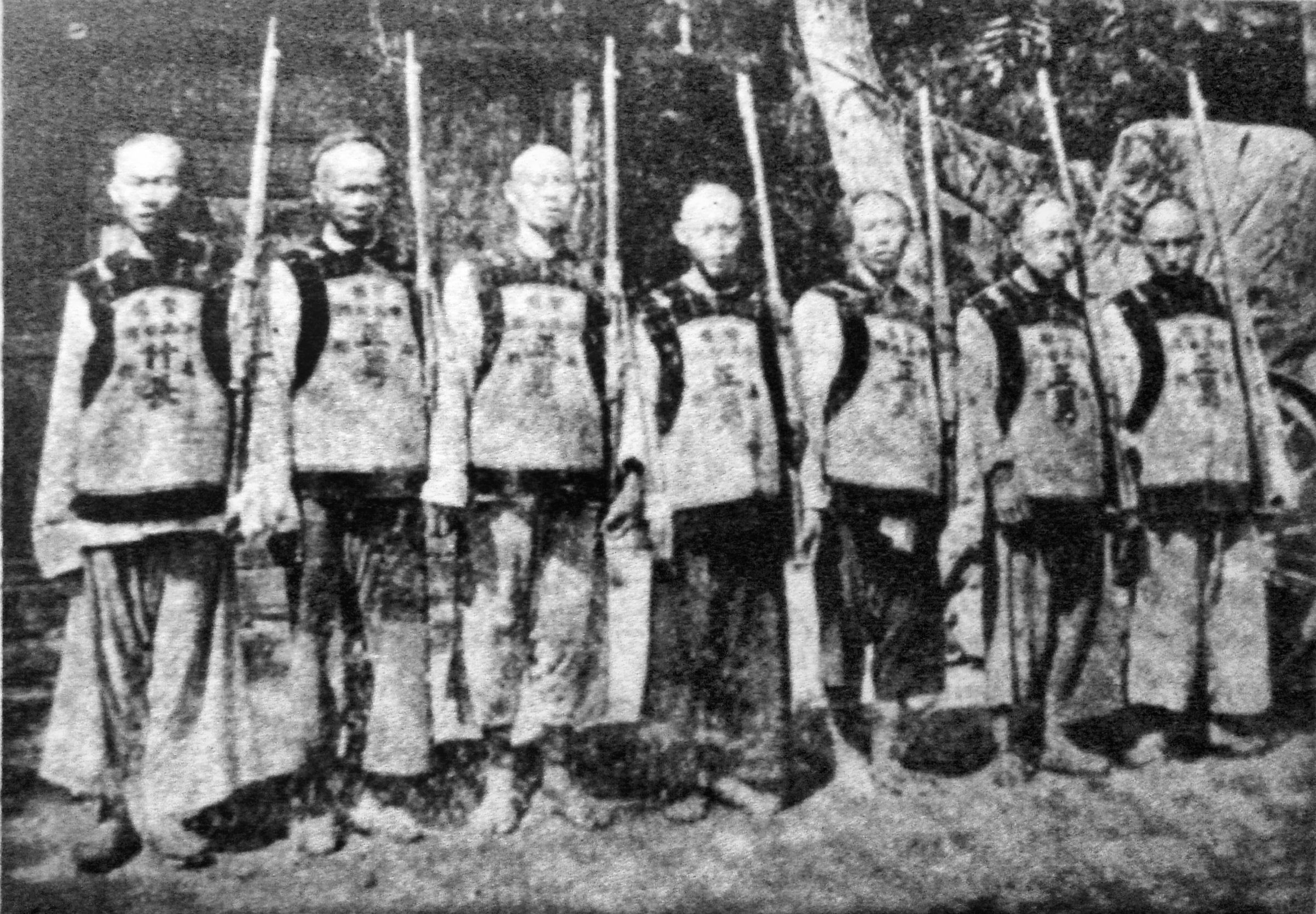
Guards of Shanghai Old City

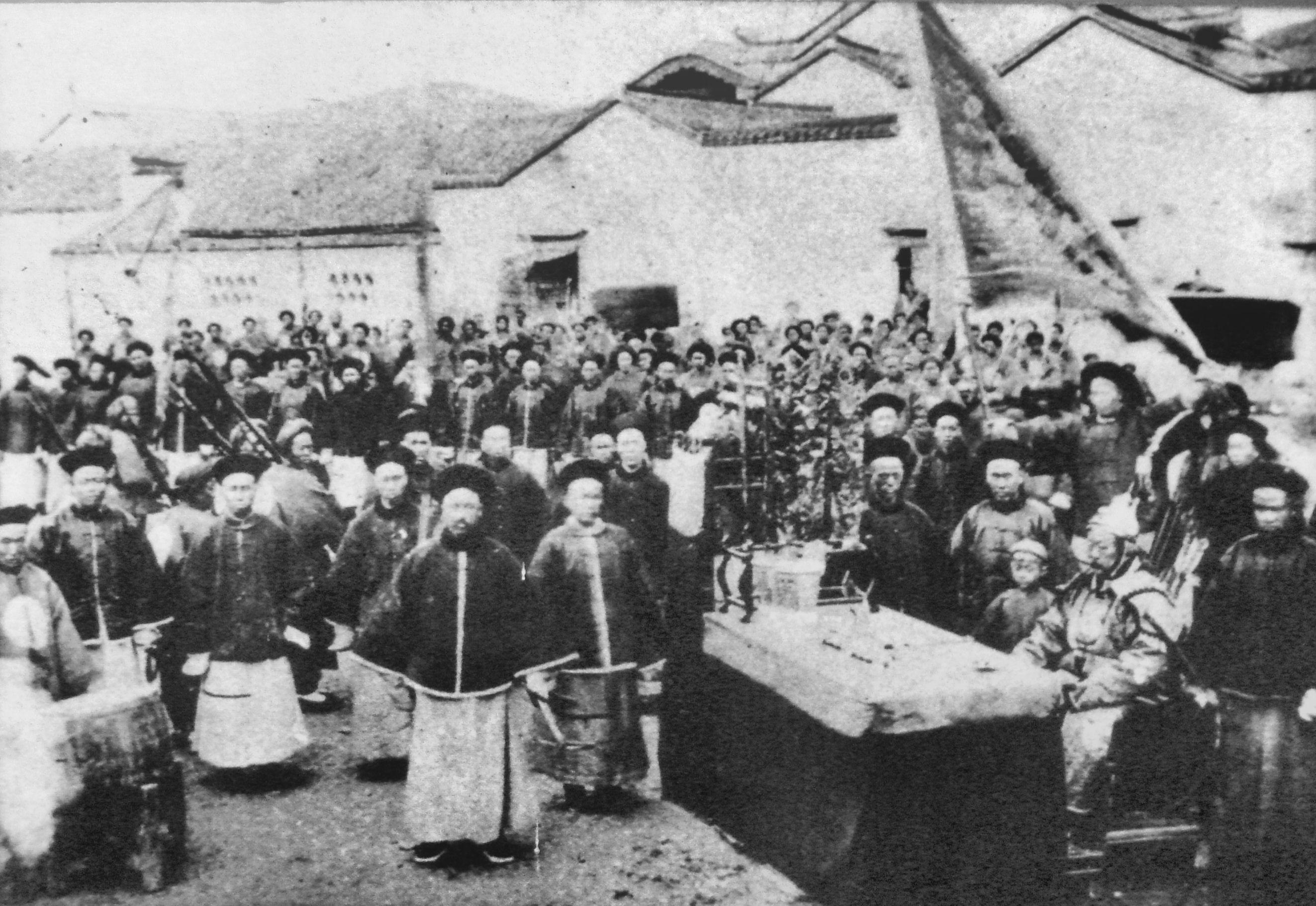
Officials of the Old City in the 1880s

== Administrative history ==
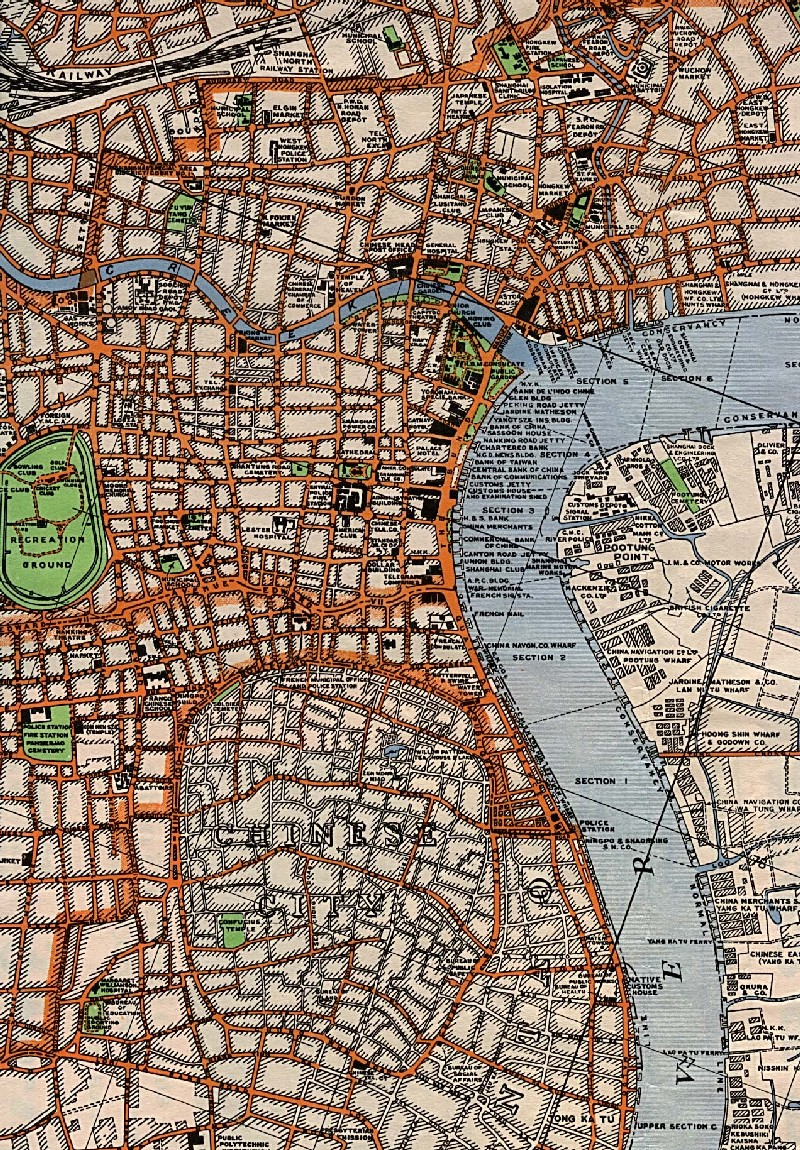
The round shape of the Old City is still clearly visible in maps: in this 1933 map, it is labelled the "Chinese City" (at bottom). Immediately to the north, east and west is the French Concession, and further to the north is the International Settlement.

The Old City of Shanghai stands on the site of a relatively small settlement in ancient times, which began to develop in importance in the 12th and 13th century due to the siltration of waterways further upstream, causing dock and market activities to move from larger upstream towns to this location. In 1267, in the Song dynasty, Shanghai was raised to township status, with a military garrison, within Huating County. In 1277, Shanghai township was chosen as the location of one of seven customs authorities across the empire to handle overseas trade; the surrounding Huating County was raised to prefecture level. The location of the customs office(which later became the office of Shanghai's county government), became a centre around which the Old City grew.

The importance of this trade function led to Shanghai being raised to county status in 1292, the Old City becoming the seat of the new county. Under the Qing, it also became the seat of the local circuit and its administration headed by an intendant ("taotai"). While the foreign concessions developed into new urban areas of Shanghai, the Old City remained the seat of the county, which nominally included the foreign concessions, but in reality the county's authority extended only over the Chinese areas of the city, being the Old City, the western suburbs which is today Minhang District, and the docklands and factory areas in the northeast. (Apart from a small dockland area near the river, today's Pudong was a separate county.) In 1912, after the establishment of the Republic of China, the Old City was officially raised to city status (Shanghai City), under Shanghai County, although the city status was revoked and restored several times in the next years due to political changes in the capital Beijing and power struggles among warlords locally.

In 1927, in a bid to establish a tangible Chinese authority in Shanghai, the Republic of China government established the Special Municipality of Shanghai. The municipal government was moved out of the Old City to near Xujiahui. In 1928, Shanghai City (the Old City) was reduced to district status under the Special Municipality. In 1930, Shanghai County became a separate parallel administrative unit to the Special Municipality, and the county government was moved out to Minhang. This was the end of the Old City's role as the seat of government of Shanghai.

From 1928, the Old City was Hunan District; "Hunan" (滬/沪南, not to be confused with Hunan province) literally meant "southern Shanghai". In 1937, the collaborationist puppet government under Japanese occupation renamed the district "Nanshi" (literally the "southern city"). In 1945, upon recovering Shanghai at the end of World War II, the Republic of China government split Nanshi district into Yimiao District and Penglai District. In 1959, the People's Republic of China government re-combined the two districts into Nanshi District. (Between 1961 and 1993, the docklands on the Pudong (eastern) side of the river was part of Nanshi District.) In 2000, Nanshi District was merged into Huangpu District, thus ending the separate existence of the Old City as an administrative division.

== Today ==
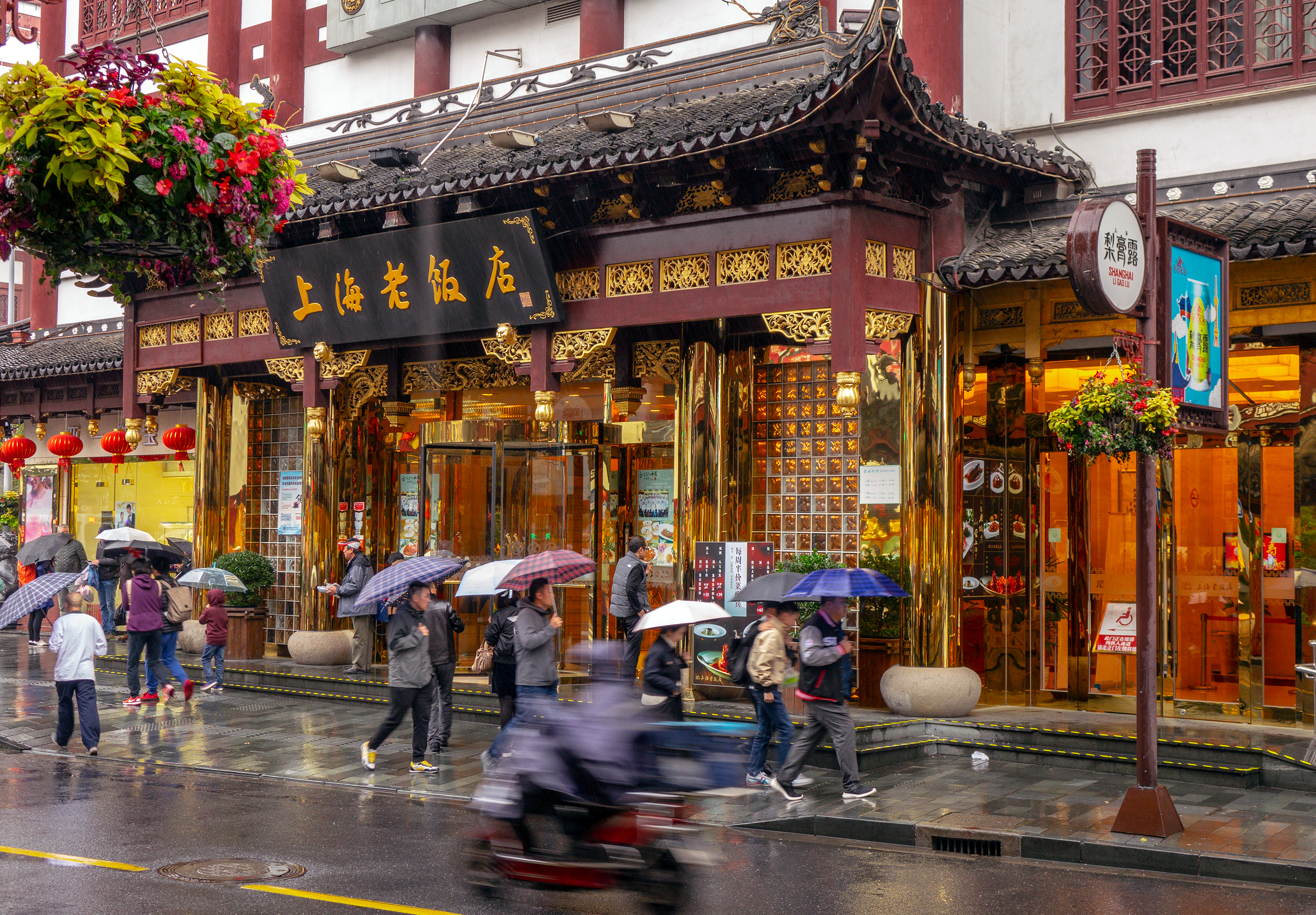
A street just outside the Old City God Temple commercial area, 2018. Although portions of the Old City were not demolished, the area has been renovated over the past decade; much of it now consists of commercial premises in a theatrical style.

Today the Old City contains some ancient but renovated features, such as the Yuyuan Garden complex first created in the 1500s during the Ming dynasty, the pedestrian streets of the commercial area around the garden and the City God Temple (materials for tourists often refer to it as the Nanshi District although the area is now in the Huangpu District).

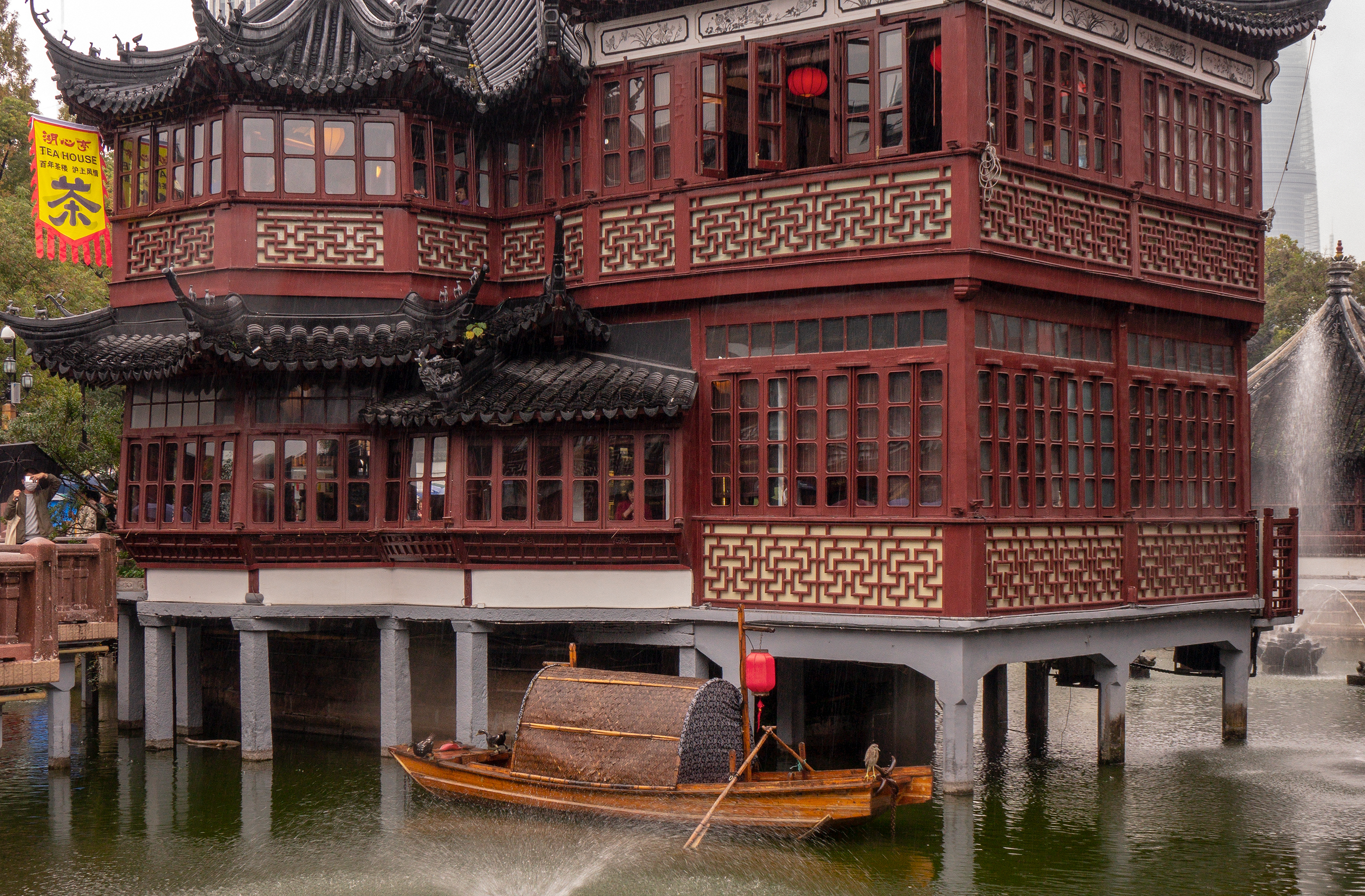
Built in 1855, the Huxinting Teahouse at the Yu Garden pond remains in use in 2018.

The old city's circular shape is now imprinted by the surrounded large streets which occupy the space of the former walls, now Renmin Road to the North and Zhonghua Road to the South. The Old City has also been cut in the middle North to South by Henan Road. The Old City is a combination of ancient winding streets, with some modern high-rise buildings progressively encroaching on the older areas.

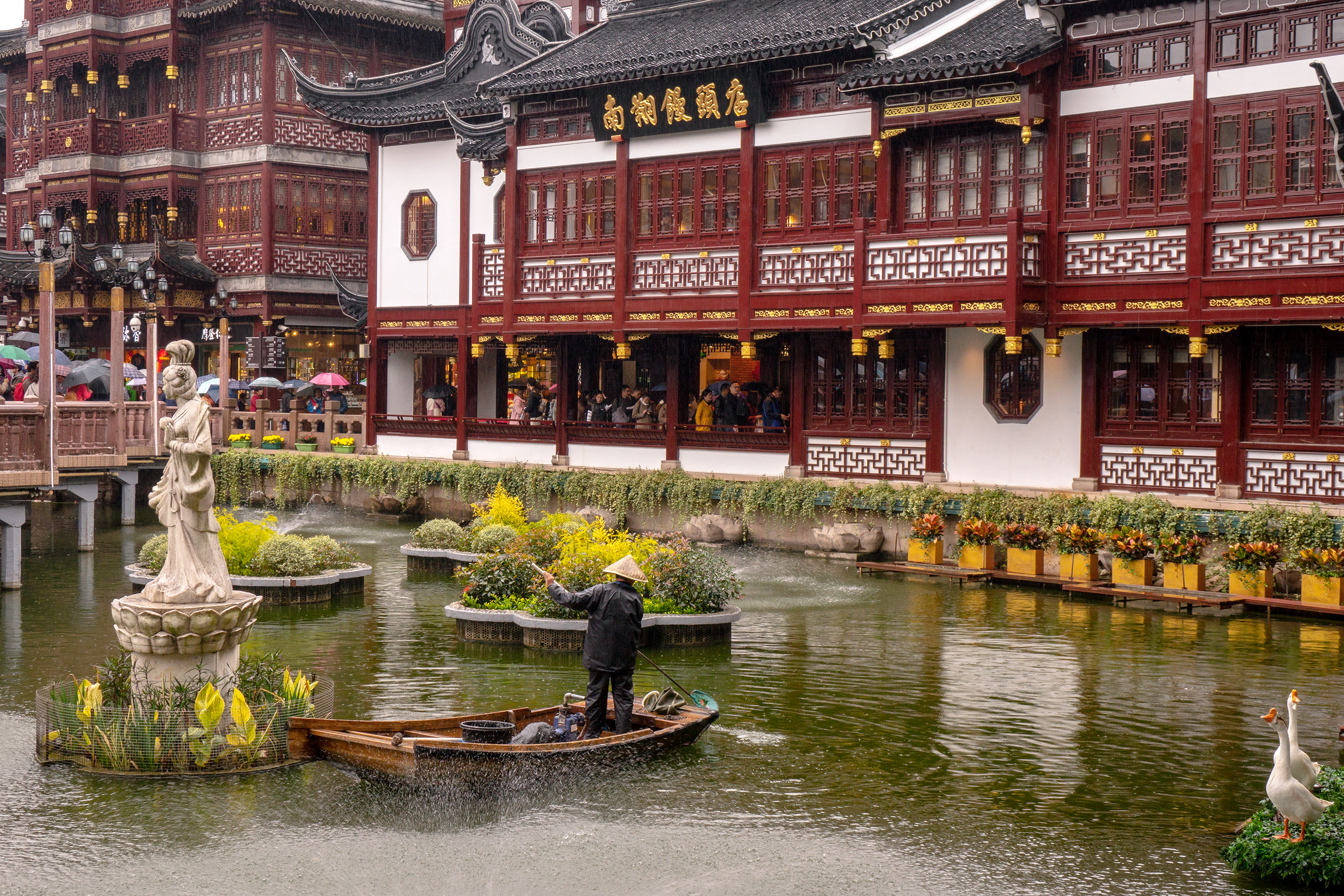
The pond in the Old City God Temple commercial area, just outside Yuyuan Garden

In 2006, the Shanghai municipal government enacted the Protection Plan for the Old City Historical Cultural Scenery Area. Under the plan, the entirety of the Old City is protected as a Historical cultural Scenery Area. 34 streets, including Dajing Road and West Fangbang Road are specifically protected as "scenery protected laneways".

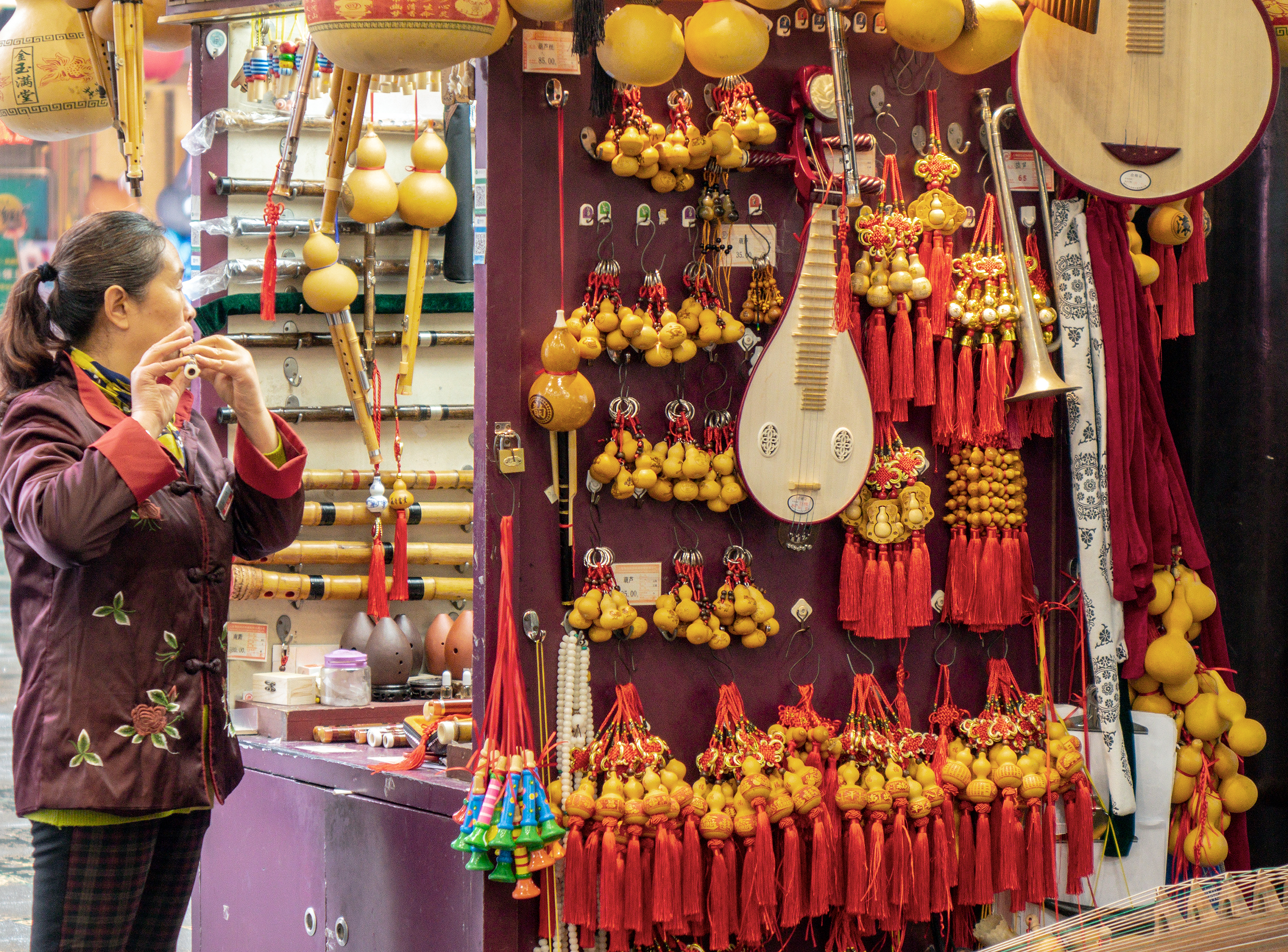
A market vendor in the Old City God Temple commercial area, 2018

However, in the same period, large scale demolition of the Old City is continuing. The Garden of the Fragrance of Dew area (the "Middle Fangbang Road-Dajing Road" protected area), almost the entire north-west quadrant of the Old City, was demolished starting from 2002. Part of the site has been redeveloped into a high rise hotel and residential building and multi-storey buildings, drastically changing the streetscape, while the remainder of the site is intended to be a low-rise residential area. The development has also roused controversy as it involved the demolition of a significant section of surviving city wall, as well as the destruction of several houses of historical significance.

== Gallery ==
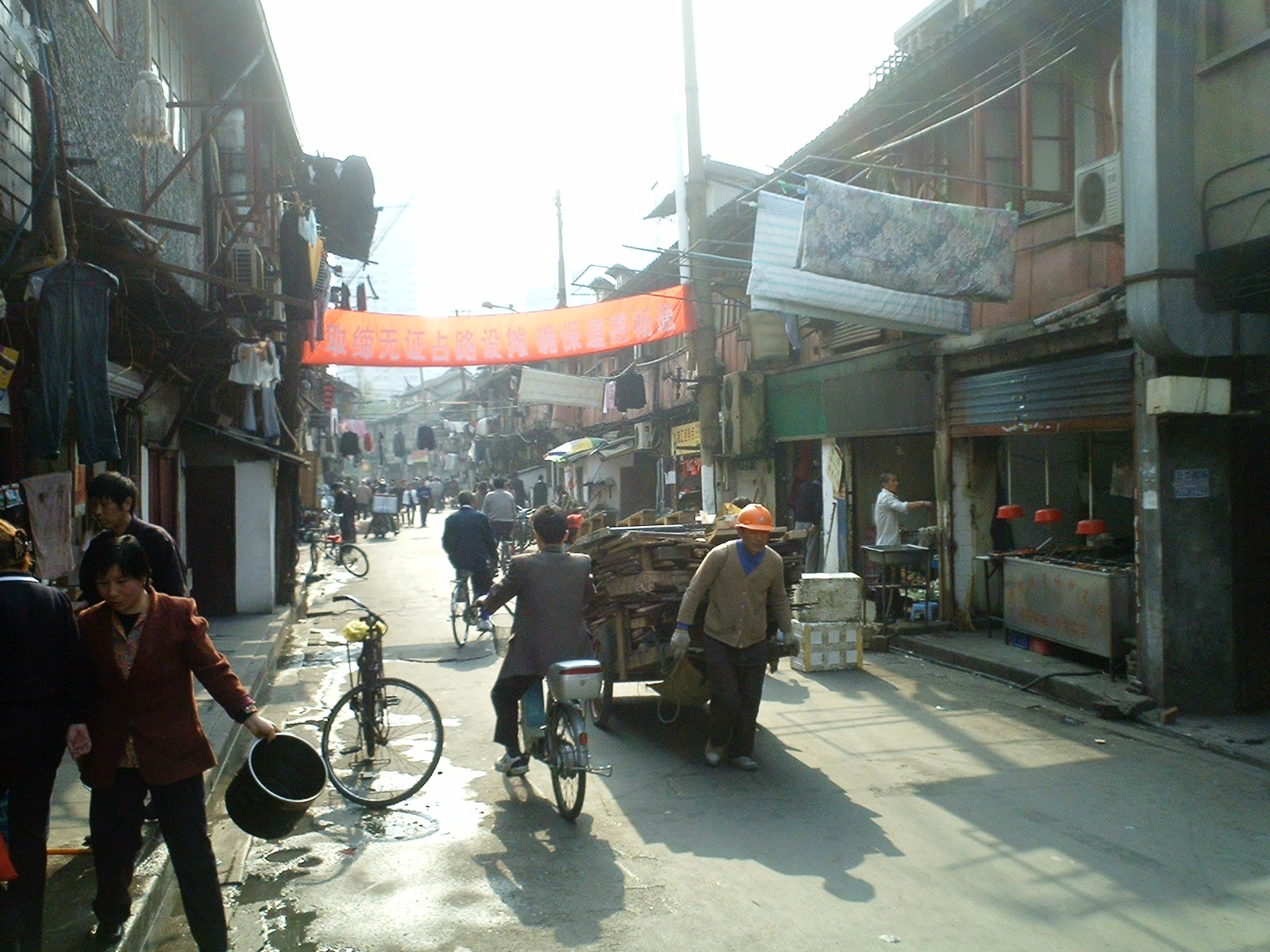
Old City street

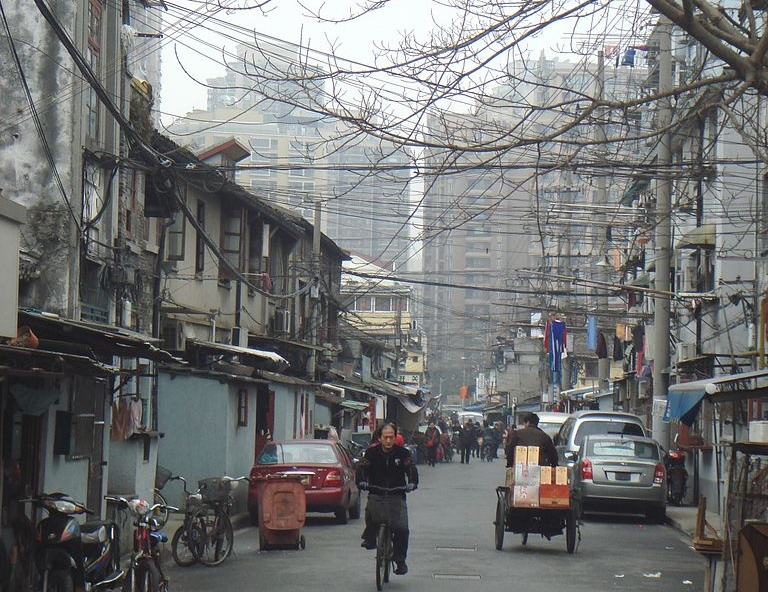
Shanghai Old City street

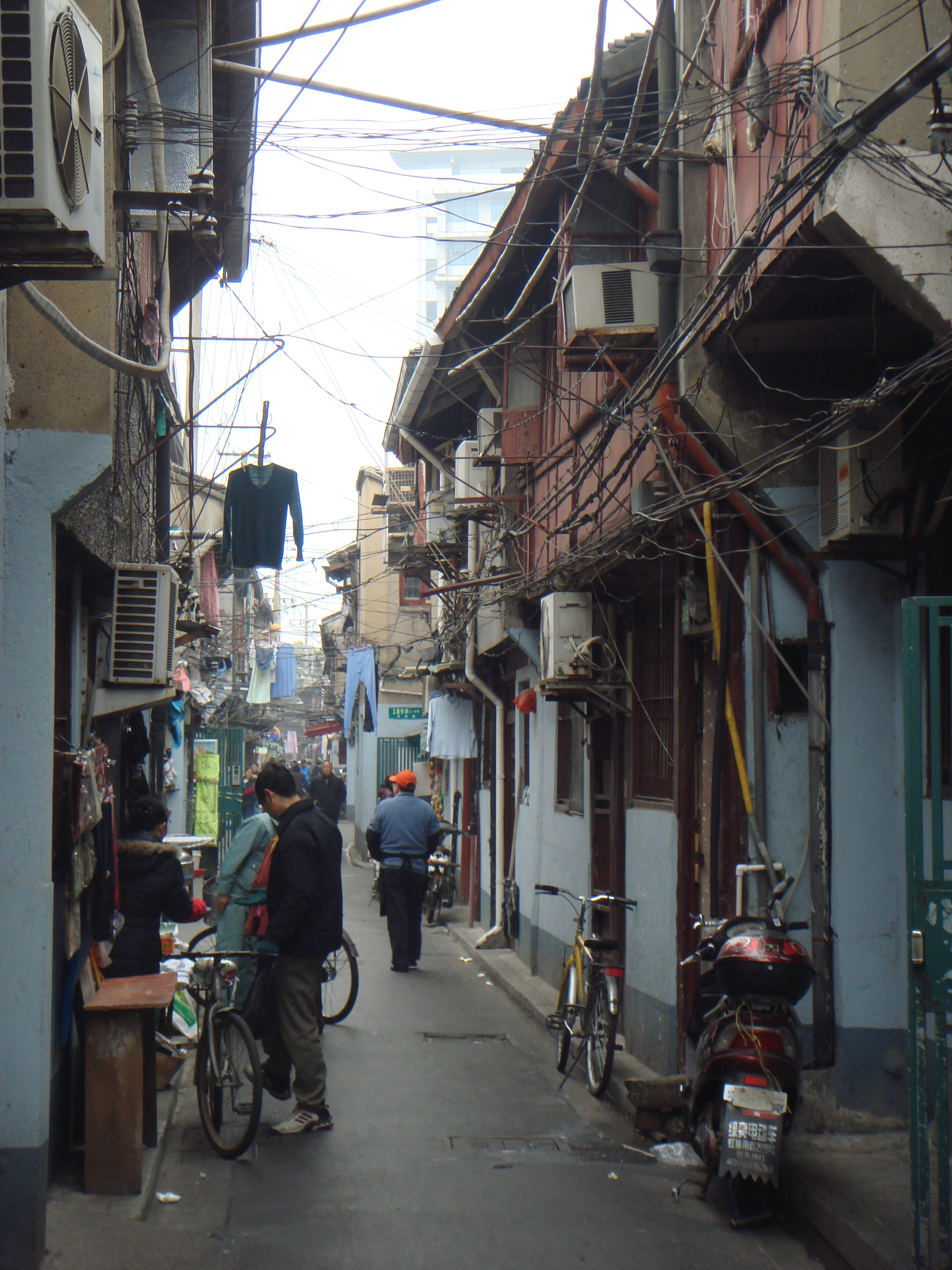
Danfeng Road (丹凤路) in the Old City, southeast quadrant

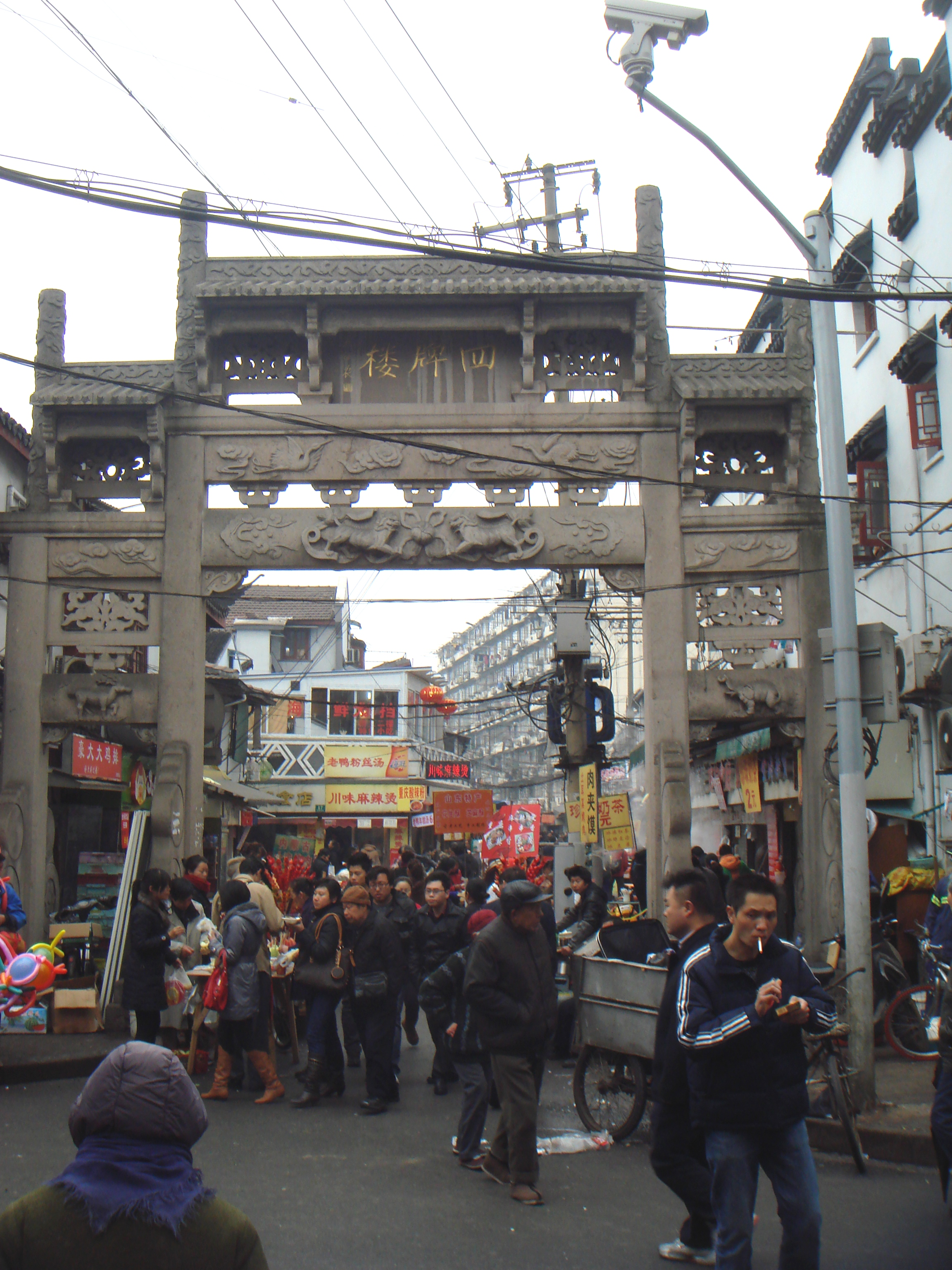
Market in Sipai Road (四牌路) in the Old City, southeast quadrant

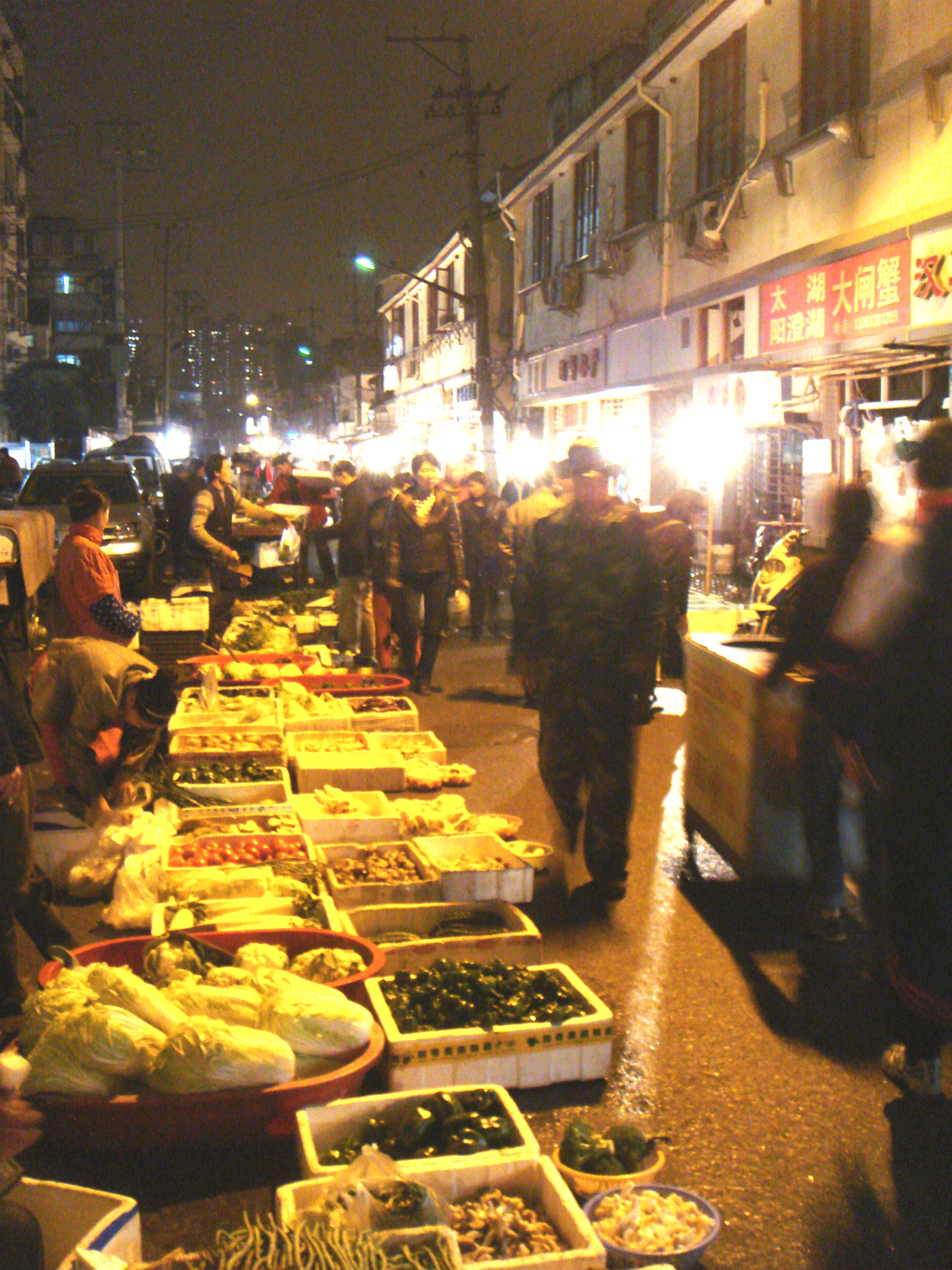
Night market in the Old City on Guangqi Road, 光启路)

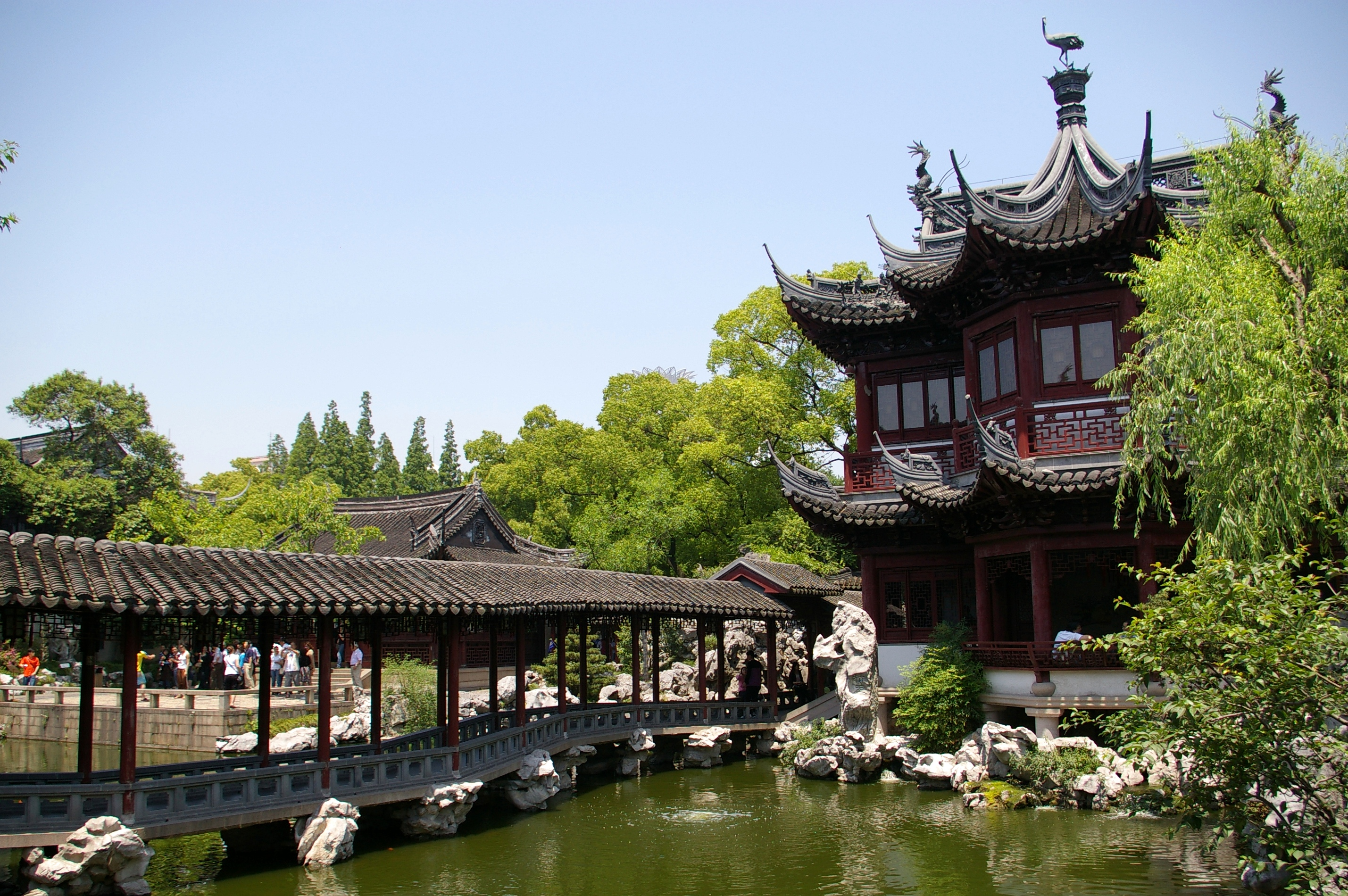
Yuyuan Garden

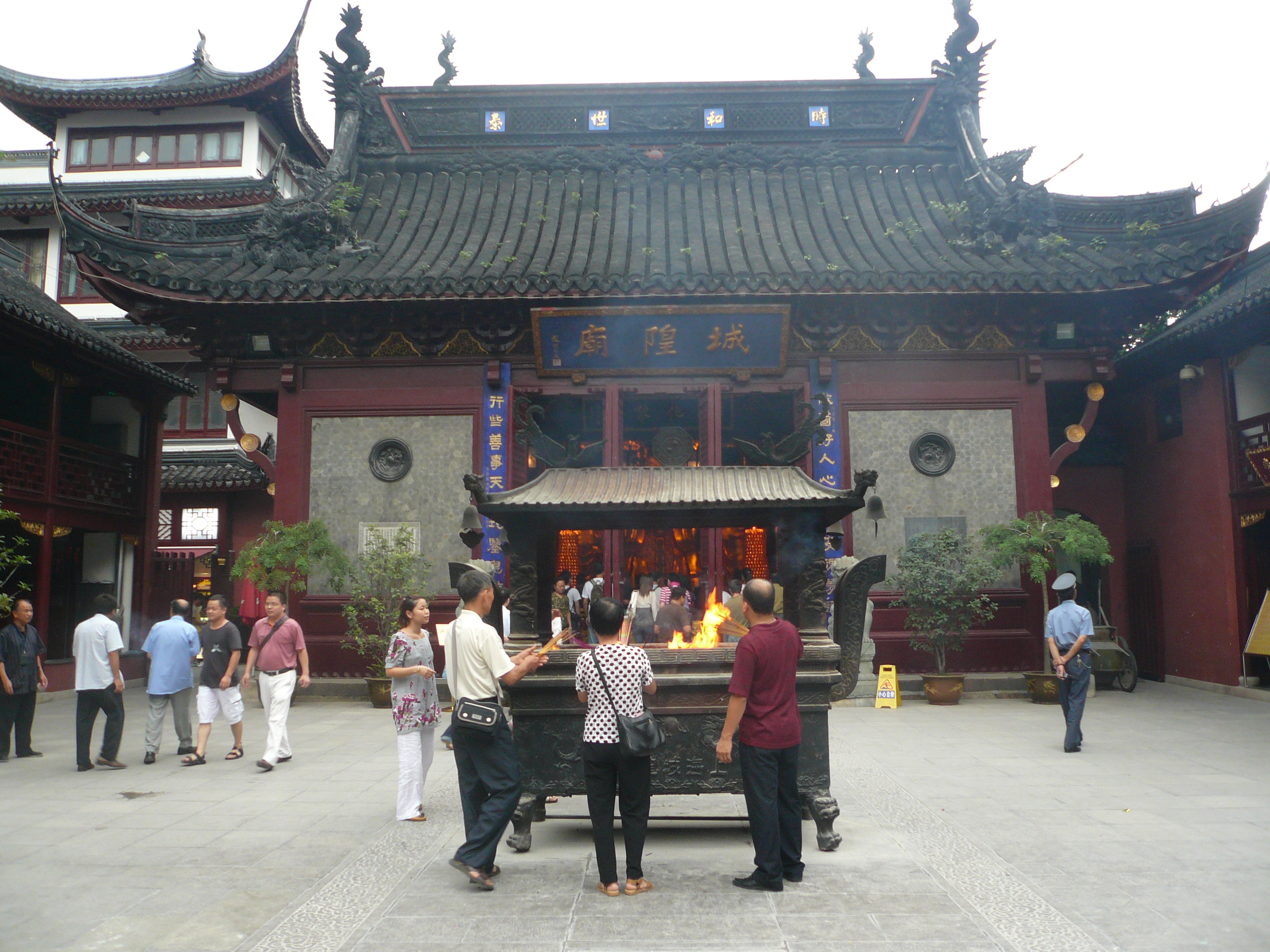
City God Temple

== See also ==
- History of Shanghai
  - Shanghai County
