= Jiangwan Stadium =

Sports venue in Shanghai, China

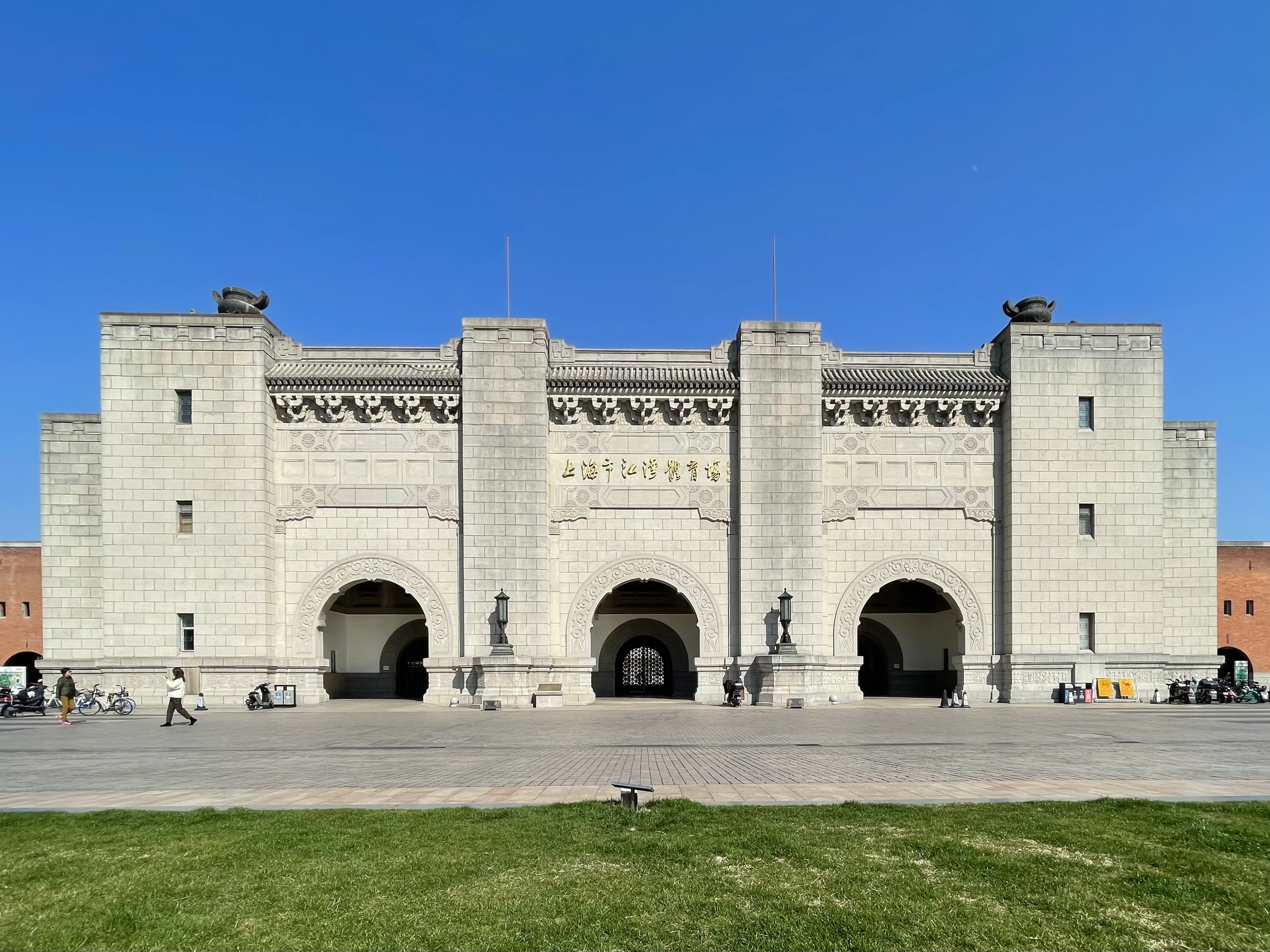
- Interactive map of Jiangwan Stadium
- Former names: Shanghai Stadium
- Location: Yangpu District, Shanghai
- Coordinates: 31.3068°N 121.5154°E
- Owner: Shanghai Municipal Government
- Capacity: 25,000 (11,000 for AFL)
- Field size: 330m x 175m
- Public transit: 10 Jiangwan Stadium station

Construction
- Opened: 1934
- Architect: Dong Dayou

Tenants
- Port Adelaide Football Club (AFL) (2017–2019); Gold Coast Football Club (AFL) (2017–2018); St Kilda Football Club (AFL) (2019)

Website
- http://www.kic-jwsc.com

The Jiangwan Stadium (simplified Chinese: 江湾体育场; traditional Chinese: 江灣體育場), formerly Shanghai Stadium, is a multi-purpose athletics stadium in Shanghai.

== History ==
The Jiangwan Sports Centre precinct under construction in 1935.

Jiangwan Stadium was built in 1934 as part of the Greater Shanghai Plan. It hosted its first National Games of China in 1935.

During World War II the stadium was damaged by the Japanese during the Battle of Shanghai.

The Kuomintang government repaired the stadium for the Seventh National Games in 1948. This would be the last National Games before the People's Republic of China was established in 1949.

It hosted the National Games of China for the last time in 1983 when 8,943 athletes took part in 26 sports.

== Australian rules football ==
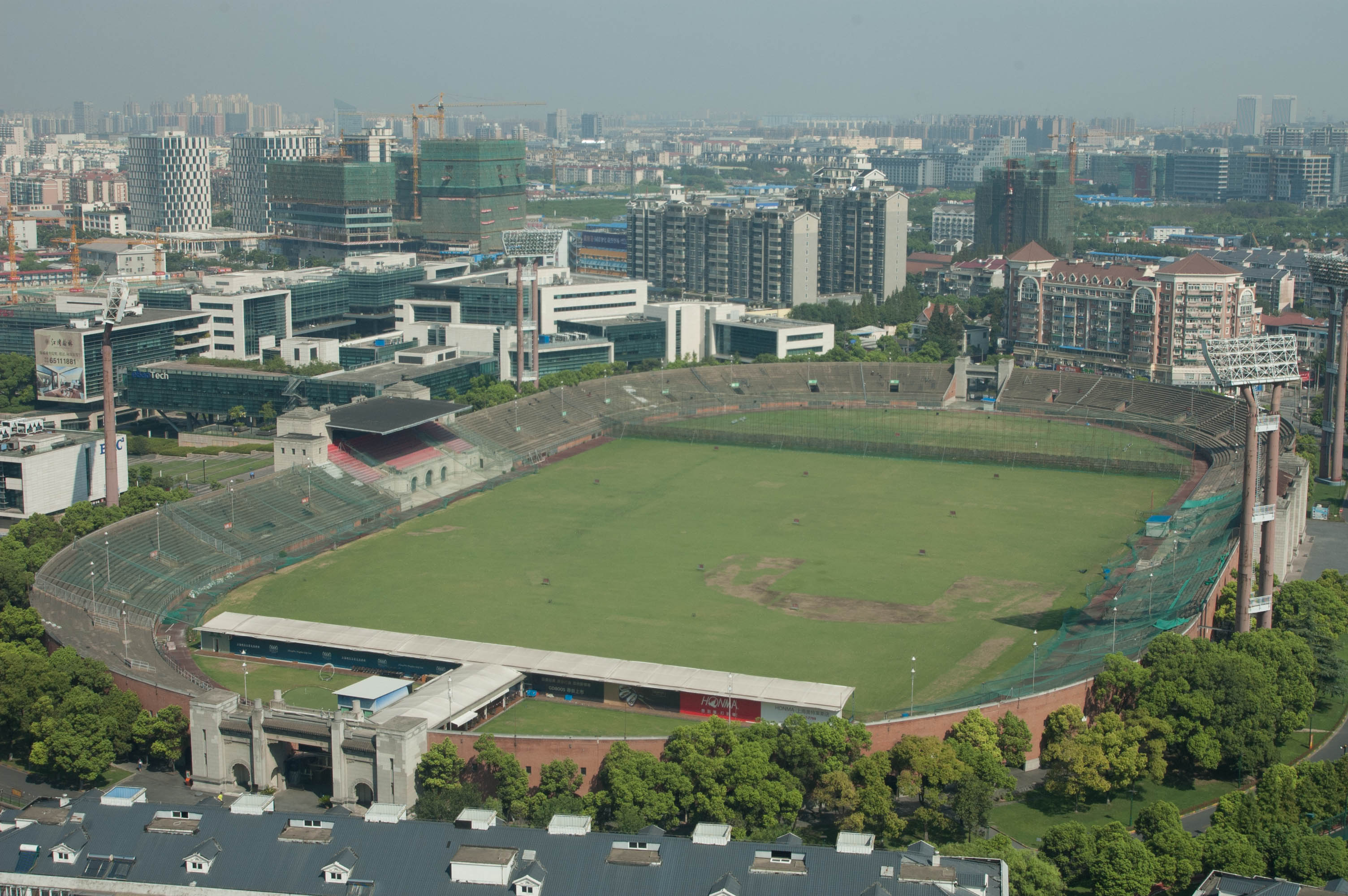
The outside of the stadium in 2013.

On 17 October 2010, the stadium hosted a post season exhibition Australian Football League (AFL) match between the Melbourne Demons and the Brisbane Lions.

On 14 May 2017, the stadium hosted its first AFL regular season match for premiership points when Port Adelaide played the Gold Coast Suns during the 2017 AFL season. This was the first AFL premiership match to be played outside of Oceania. Port Adelaide won the match by a score of 16.14 (110) to 4.14 (38), in front of an official attendance of 10,118.

On 24 October 2017, it was announced that the AFL playing surface at the stadium will now be known as Adelaide Arena, and that AFL would be returning to the stadium in 2018.

On 25 October 2018, it was announced that St Kilda would play Port Adelaide for the following three seasons in Shanghai. No game was played in 2020 due to the COVID-19 pandemic; the match was later rescheduled to be played at Marvel Stadium in Melbourne, but was eventually scrapped following the suspension of the season on 22 March.

Since the COVID-19 pandemic, no AFL games have been played at the venue. St Kilda played Adelaide at Cazaly's Stadium in Cairns, Queensland in 2021, before hosting Port Adelaide in Cairns the following season.

=== Australian Football League matches ===
| Year | Rnd | Date & local time | Team | Score | Team | Score | Attendance | Ref. |
|---|---|---|---|---|---|---|---|---|
| 2017 | 8 | Sunday, 14 May (1:15 pm) | Gold Coast | 4.14 (38) | Port Adelaide | 16.14 (110) | 10,118 | |
| 2018 | 9 | Sunday, 19 May 2018 (1:15 pm) | Gold Coast | 6.6 (42) | Port Adelaide | 11.16 (82) | 10,689 | |
| 2019 | 11 | Sunday, 2 June (12:40 pm) | St Kilda | 9.15 (69) | Port Adelaide | 22.7 (139) | 9,412 | |

== Architecture ==
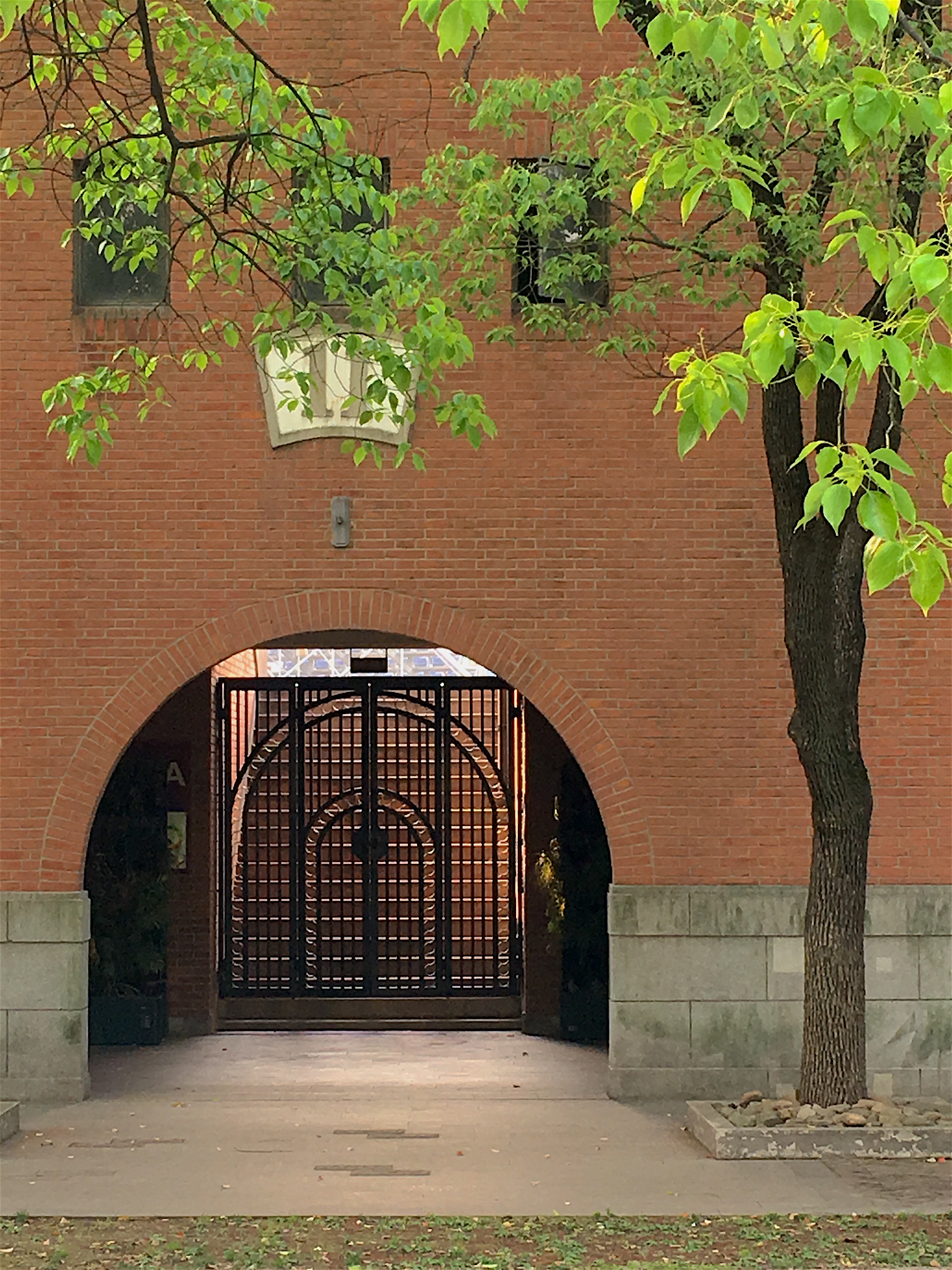
The exterior of Jiangwan Stadium is done in an Art Deco style

The stadiums architecture style is Chinese Art Deco, with the stadium itself designed by Dong Dayou, responsible for many landmarks in Shanghai built as part of the Greater Shanghai Plan implementation during the 1930s.

== Transportation ==
The sport center is accessible from Jiangwan Stadium Station of Shanghai Metro.

== See also ==
- Sport in China
