= Dong Dayou =

Chinese architect

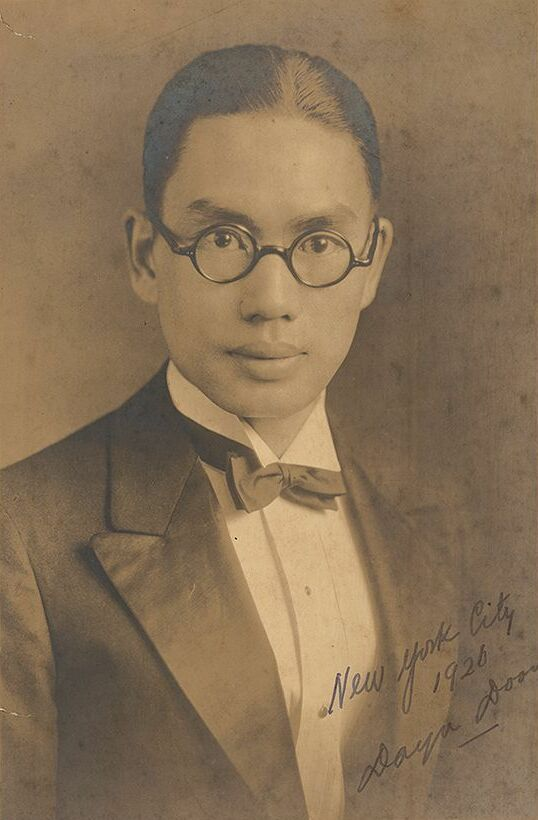
Dong Dayou

Dong Dayou (董大酉, 1899 – 1973, also Romanized as Doon Dayu) was a Chinese architect and was the Chief Architect for the Greater Shanghai Plan.

== Biography ==
Dong Dayou graduated from the University of Minnesota. At the time, the city planning approach it taught was strongly influenced by the École des Beaux-Arts principles. For a short period after graduation, Dong worked as an architect in the United States.

In 1929, the City Planning Commission of Shanghai was tasked with preparing a Plan for Greater Shanghai. Dong was appointed technical advisor to the commission. The plan for developing a new city center centered on a Civic Center, the plan for which was awarded to architects Zhao Shen and Sun Ximing in an open design competition. After a series of disagreements within the Planning Commission over implementing the plan, Dong was appointed Chief Architect for the revision of the master plan and for designing the individual buildings.

In 1935, Dong published the essay "Greater Shanghai–Greater Vision" in the American magazine The China Critic. Dong wrote that Shanghai "fails to meet the requirements of a modern metropolis," citing its "narrow and crooked streets", scarce open spaces, and haphazard growth resulting in factories and residences built side-by-side.

Ultimately, the Greater Shanghai Plan was interrupted by Second Sino-Japanese War and then ended after the defeat of the Nationalist Government in the Chinese Civil War.

== See also ==
- Urban planning of Shanghai
- History of Shanghai
- Urban planning in China
- Urbanization in China
