= History of Shanghai =

The history of Shanghai spans over a thousand years and closely parallels the development of modern China. Originally a small agricultural village, Shanghai developed during the late Qing dynasty (1644–1912) as one of China's principal trading ports. Although nominally part of China, in practice foreign diplomats controlled the city under the policy of extraterritoriality. Since the reform and opening up of the early 1990s the city has burgeoned to become one of Asia's major financial centers and the world's busiest container port.

== Early Era ==
Early settlements of Shanghai

The South Flank of the Yangtze Delta began to develop following the maximum Holocene marine transgression. As sediment accumulated and created new land, several parallel shell-rich sand ridges—locally known as Gangshen—were formed in present-day Jinshan and Fengxian districts in Shanghai. Ancient archaeological sites in Shanghai are mostly distributed along the western side of the Gangshen, with only a few occasionally found on the ridges themselves.

The earliest Neolithic settlements known in this area date to the Majiabang culture (5000–3300 BCE). This was overlapped by the Songze culture between around 3800–3300 BCE. In the lower stratum of the Songze excavation site in the modern-day Qingpu District, archaeologists found the prone skeleton of one of the Shanghai's earliest inhabitants—a 25-30-year-old male with an almost complete skull dated to the Majiabang era.

In the area east of the Gangshen up to Lihutang, the shoreline reached the Xinzhuang–Minhang–Nanqiao line by the 4th century, located about 10 km east of the Gangshen, and fully formed into land prior to the Tang Dynasty.

In the mid-8th century, the southeastern portion of Suzhou was detached to establish Huating County, which was subsequently governed under Suzhou and later Jiaxing. Prior to the 11th century, the Wusong River (historically known as the Song River) and its tributary, the Qinglong River, served as the main waterways, leading to the emergence of Qinglong Town as a major commercial port and naval base. By 1077, the commercial tax revenue collected here exceeded the total of all other taxes in the county combined.

However, by the Song dynasty, as continuous sedimentation narrowed the Wusong River, the course of the ancient Huangpu River shifted northward to discharge into the Wusong, gradually widening as it absorbed southern runoff. With Qinglong Town declining due to siltation, the outer port of Huating County relocated eastward to Shanghai Town along the developing Huangpu River.

== Yuan, Ming, and Early–Mid Qing periods (1270s–1843) ==
In 1277, due to its large population, Huating County was elevated to Songjiang Prefecture. In the early 1290s, five townships in eastern Huating were separated to establish Shanghai County under the jurisdiction of Songjiang Prefecture, with its administrative seat at Shanghai Town.

The soil and hydrological conditions along the eastern coast of Songjiang Prefecture were poorly suited for rice; the Yuan government thus excepted Shanghai County by levying wheat and beans for the autumn tax. Around the turn of the 14th century, cotton cultivation and advanced textile techniques—traditionally attributed to Huang Daopo following her return from Hainan—spread from Shanghai throughout the Yangzi Delta, establishing cotton as the region's main cash crop.

Following the excavation and integration of the Fanjiabang (范家浜) channel east of Shanghai County in the early fifteenth century, the Huangpu replaced the Wusong as the primary waterway draining the region into the sea.

As Shanghai's cotton textile industry rapidly commercialized during the Ming dynasty, local demand outstripped regional supply. This led to a broader division of labor, with North China expanding raw cotton cultivation to supply the looms of the region.

In response to frequent wokou (Japanese pirate) raids along the coast, a city wall was constructed around the county seat of Shanghai in 1553.

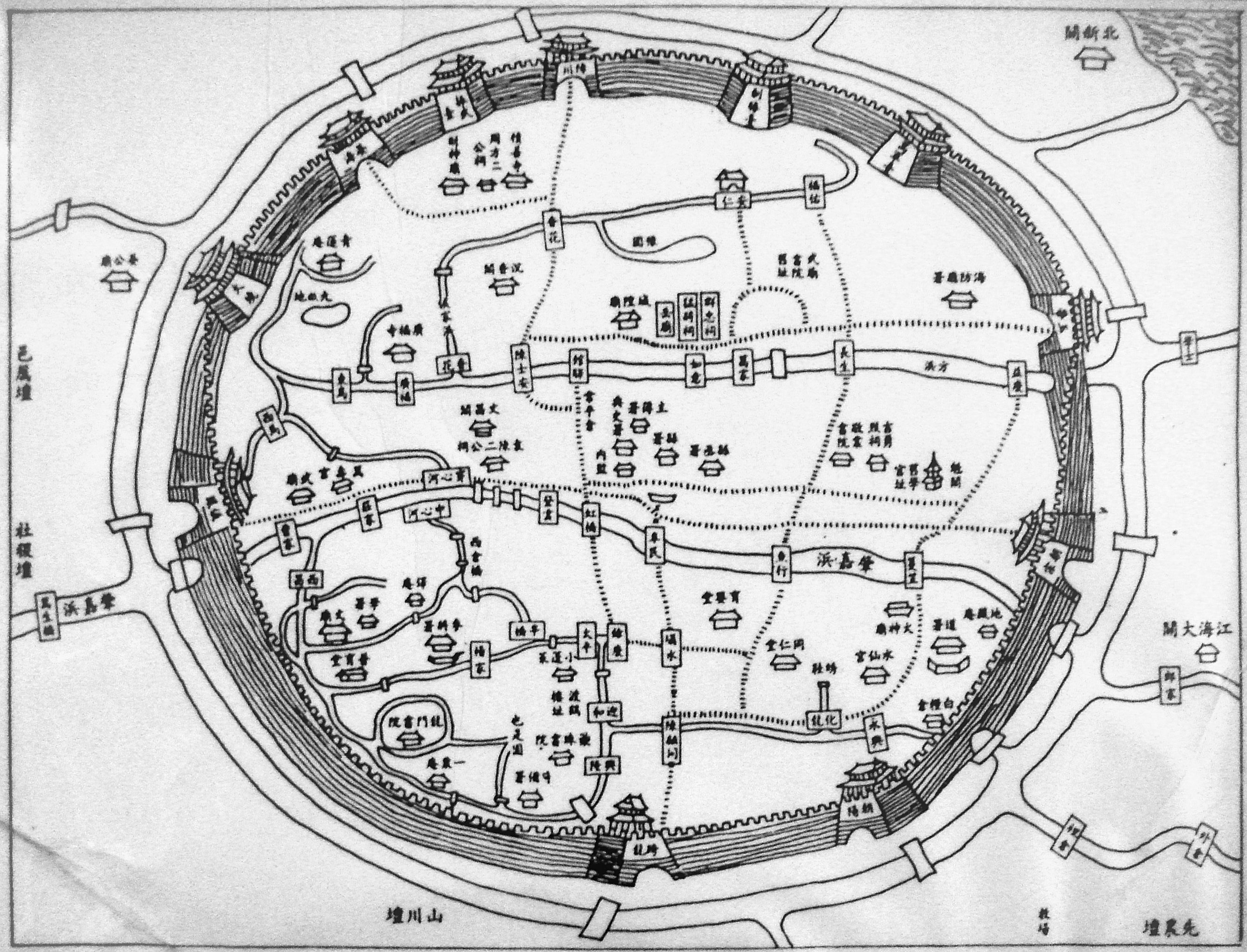
Map of the Old City of Shanghai

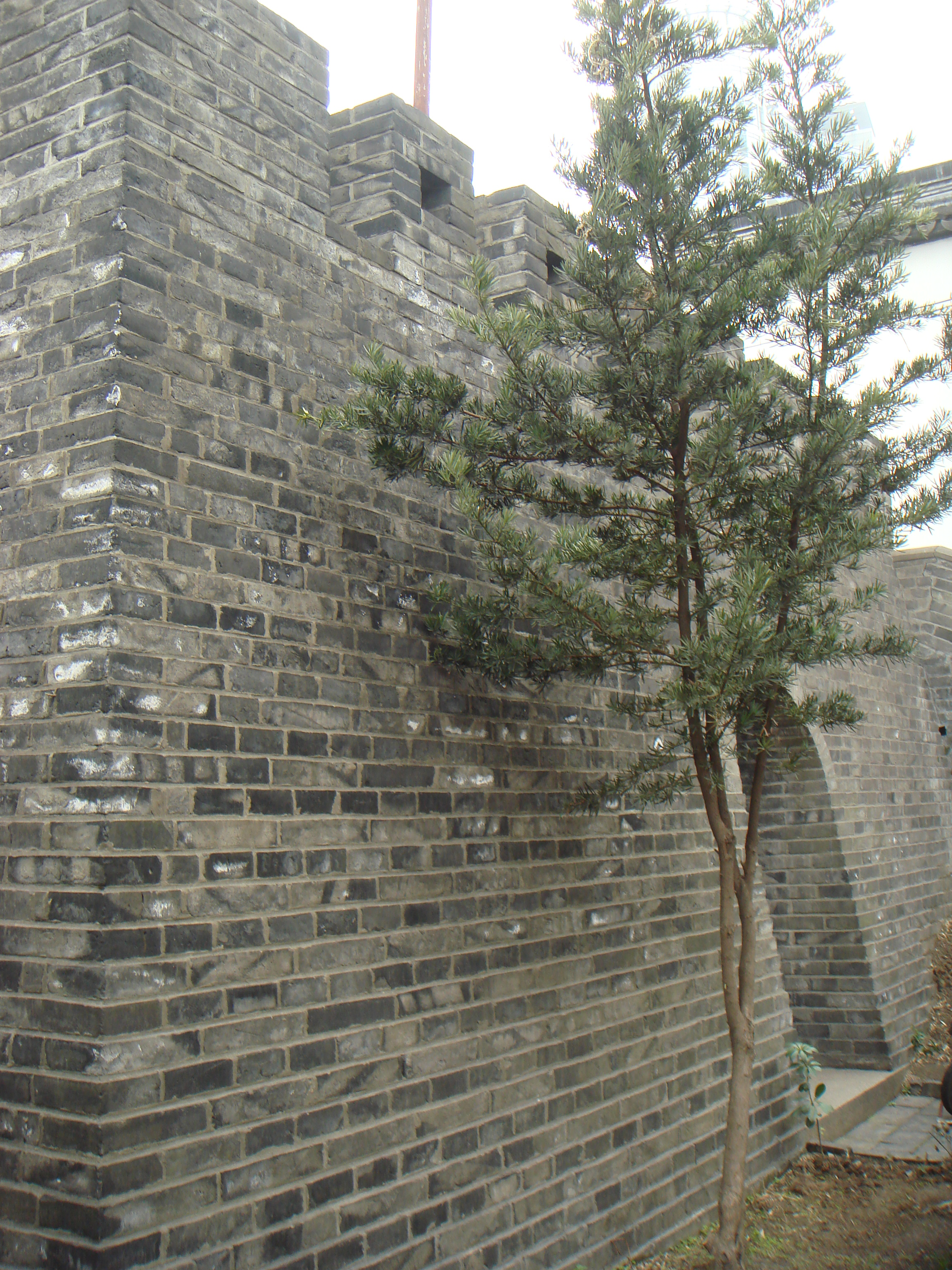
The Dàjìng Gé Pavilion wall, which is the only remaining part of the Old City of Shanghai wall

Shanghai had its first contact with the Jesuits in 1603 when the Shanghai scholar-bureaucrat Xu Guangqi was baptized by Jesuit priest Matteo Ricci.

During the Qing dynasty, the local economy gradually recovered from the late Ming depression through the cotton industry and maritime shipping. Shanghai imported bean cakes from Shandong and Liaodong (Fengtian) to fertilize local fields while exporting cotton textiles and tea northward. At the same time, ships heading north used local mud and sand as ballast, which helped dredge the Huangpu River and improved anchorage conditions.

Following the Qing court's abolition of the maritime ban, customs offices were established in the four southeastern coastal provinces; the Jiangsu customs office was later relocated to Shanghai and subsequently placed under the supervision of the Su-Song Circuit Intendant stationed in Suzhou. In 1730, the Su-Song Circuit was transferred to Shanghai, from which time the city administered grain storage, water conservancy, defense, public security, and related affairs for the region that then included Suzhou, Songjiang, and Taicang.

By the mid-eighteenth century, Shanghai's growth had already broken through the original city walls, with commercial facilities such as wharves, warehouses, the customs house, and guild halls expanding rapidly between the city's East Gate and the banks of the Huangpu. The maritime transport sector also gave rise to local sand-junk merchants; by the early nineteenth century, these merchants had accumulated considerable capital through trade with the north and were increasingly merging with the gentry class.

== Late Qing treaty port era (1843–1911) ==
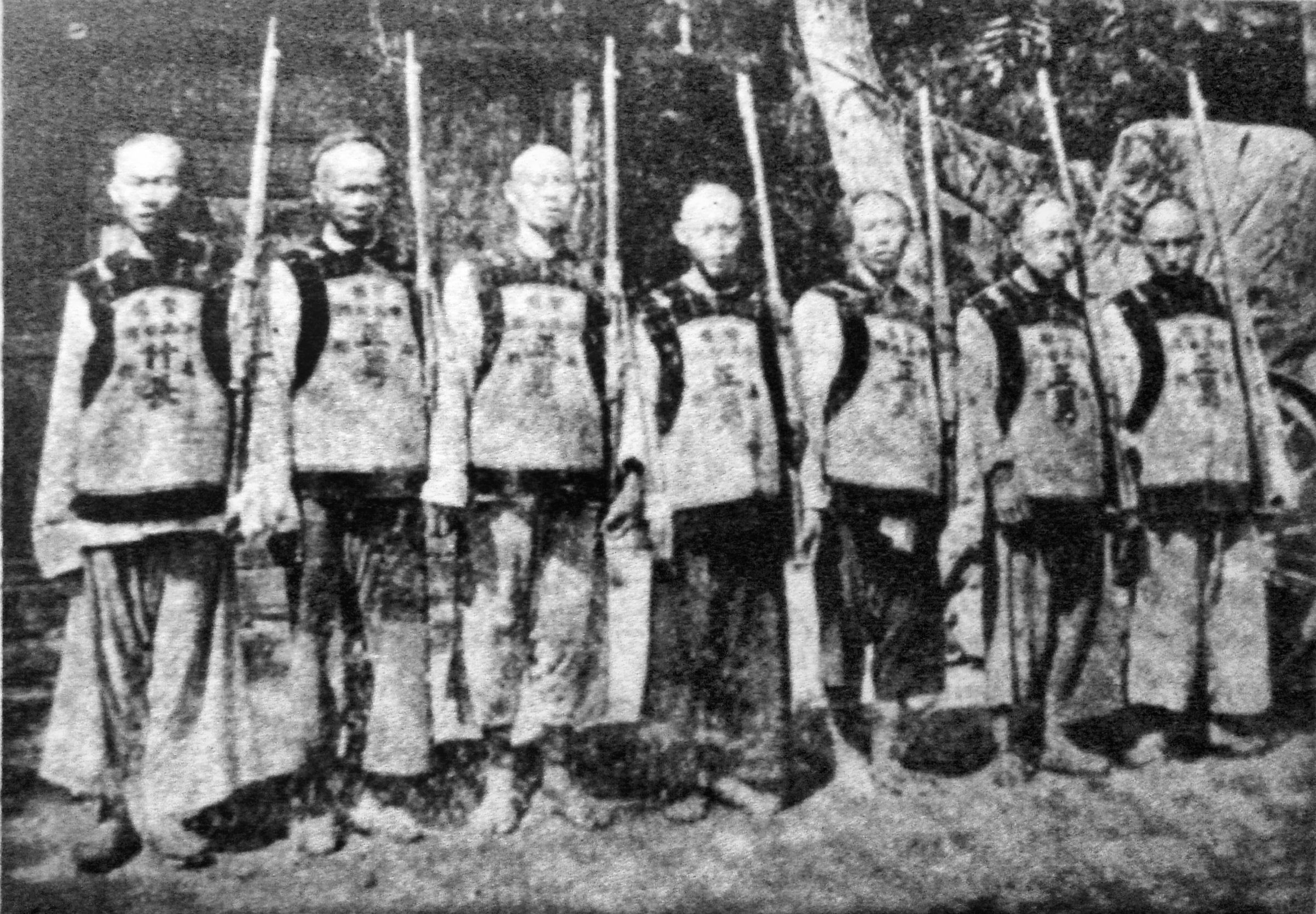
Guards of Shanghai Old City

During the late Qing dynasty, Shanghai's economy began to rival that of the traditionally larger market at Suzhou. In the 18th and early 19th centuries, exports of cotton and silk reached as far as Polynesia and Persia.

In 1832, the East India Company explored Shanghai and the Yangzi River as a potential trading center for tea, silk, and opium, but were rebuffed by local officials. Chinese attempts to prohibit the opium trade into China led to the First Opium War (1839–1842) with the United Kingdom; the Treaty of Nanjing, which concluded the war with a British victory, opened up five treaty ports in China to British merchants, including Shanghai. Similar treaties were quickly signed with other Western nations, and French, American and German merchants joined their British counterparts in establishing a presence in Shanghai, residing in sovereign concessions where they were not subject to Chinese laws. The British established their concession in 1845, the Americans in 1848 in Hongkou, north of Suzhou Creek, and the French set up their concession in 1849 west of the old Chinese city and south of the British Concession. In 1846, Peter Richards founded Richards' Hotel, the first western hotel in China. It would later become the Astor House. In 1850, the first English-language newspaper in Shanghai, the North China Herald, was launched.

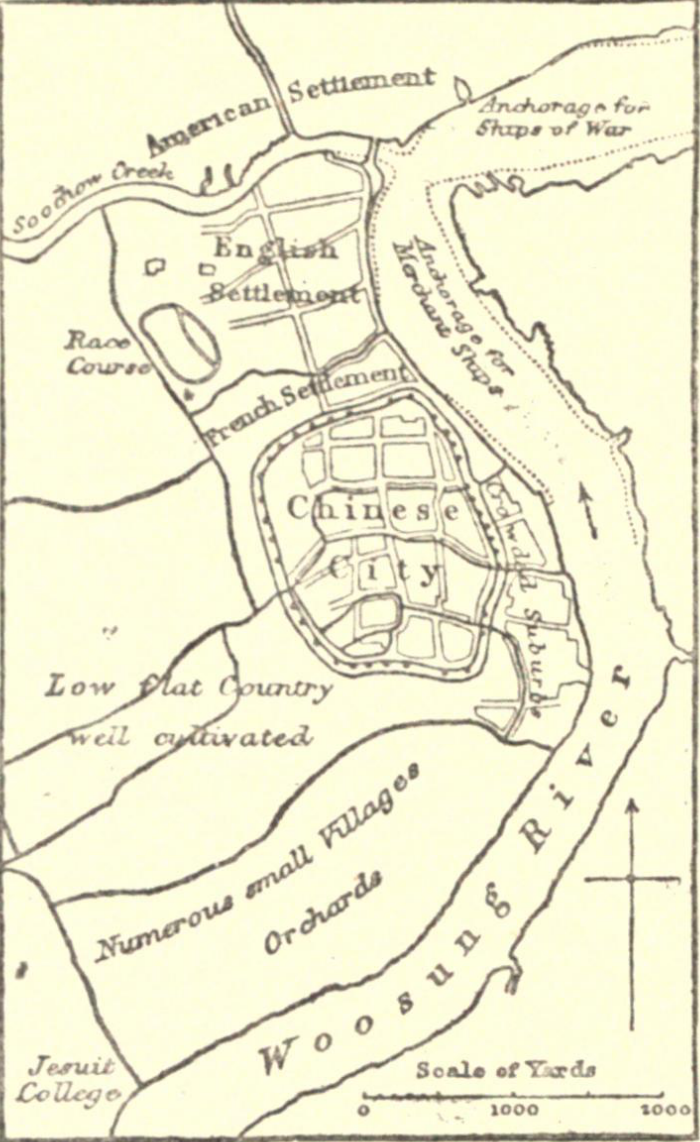
Shanghai, c. 1886

The Taiping Rebellion was the largest of a number of widespread rebellions against the hugely unpopular Qing regime. In 1853, Shanghai was occupied by a triad offshoot of the rebels called the Small Swords Society. The fighting devastated much of the countryside but left the foreign settlements untouched.

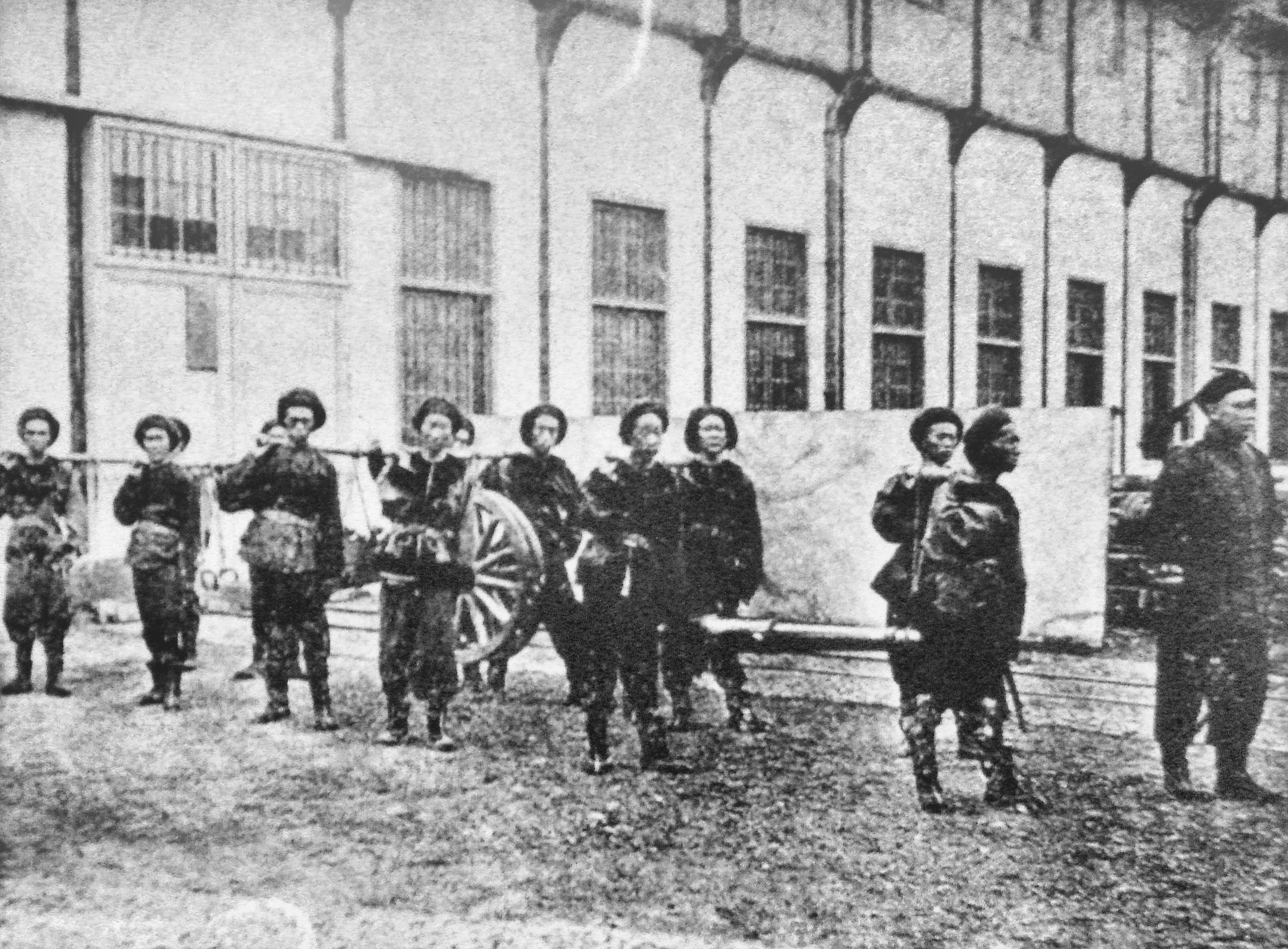
Gun transportation at Shanghai Jiangnan Arsenal (上海江南制造兵工厂), during the Self-Strengthening Movement

In 1854 a group of Western businessmen met and formed the Shanghai Municipal Council to organise road repairs, refuse clearance and tax collection across the concessions. In 1863 the American concession (land fronting the Huangpu River to the north-east of Suzhou Creek) officially joined the British Settlement (stretching from Yang-ching-pang Creek to Suzhou Creek) to become the Shanghai International Settlement. Its waterfront became the internationally famous Bund. The Shanghai French Concession, to the west of the old town, remained independent and the Chinese retained control over the original walled city and the area surrounding the foreign enclaves. By the late-1860s Shanghai's official governing body had been practically transferred from the individual concessions to the Shanghai Municipal Council. The International Settlement was wholly foreign-controlled with the British holding the largest number of seats on the council and heading all the Municipal departments. No Chinese residing in the International Settlement were permitted to join the council until 1928.

Jardine's attempt to construct the Woosung "Road" railway in 1876 – China's first – proved initially successful until the death of a soldier on the tracks prompted the Chinese government to demand its nationalization. Upon the last payment in 1877, the local viceroy ordered the profitable railway dismantled and removed to Taiwan. The telegraph that had been strung along the line of the railway – also China's first – was, however, allowed to remain in operation.

By the mid-1880s, the Shanghai Municipal Council had a practical monopoly over a large part of the city's services. It bought up all the local gas-suppliers, electricity producers and water-companies. In the early 20th century, it took control over all non-private rickshaws and the Settlement tramways. It also regulated opium sales and prostitution until their banning in 1918 and 1920 respectively.

The Treaty of Shimonoseki, which ended the First Sino-Japanese War, saw Japan emerge as an additional foreign power in Shanghai. Japan built the first factories in Shanghai, which were soon followed by other foreign powers. The Chinese defeat also spurred reformers within the Qing government to modernize more quickly, leading to the reestablishment of the Songhu Railway and its expansion into the Shanghai–Nanjing Railway.

== Republic of China ==
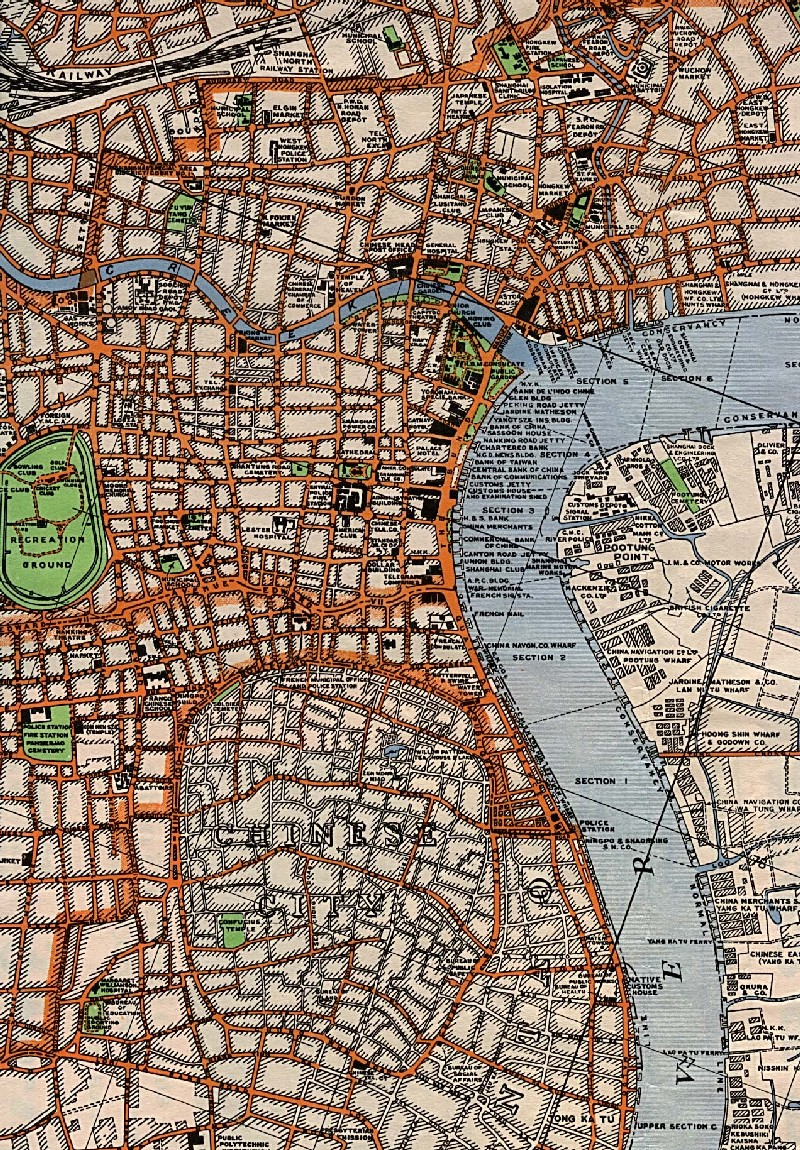
1933 map of Shanghai

The 1911 Xinhai Revolution, spurred in part by actions against the native-owned railways around Shanghai, led to the establishment of the Republic of China. During that time, Shanghai became the focal point of many activities that would eventually shape modern China.

In 1936, Shanghai was one of the largest cities in the world with 3 million inhabitants. Of those, only 35,000-50,000 were of European origin, but these controlled half the city under the unequal treaties that provided extraterritoriality until 1943. Many White Russians fled to China after the 1917 Russian Revolution, trickling to Shanghai along the 1920s. The number of people with Russian origins was about 35,000 by the 1930s, well exceeding number of other people with European origin. These Shanghai Russians were sometimes poorly regarded by westerners, as their general poverty led them to take jobs considered unsuitable for Europeans, including prostitution. However, among Russian emigration was layered, also including several well-to-do members. Russian artists dominated Shanghai's artistic life almost single-handedly. Many Jewish refugees from Nazi Germany arrived in the 1930s.

The city was thus divided between its more European western half and the more traditionally Chinese eastern half. New inventions like electricity and trams were quickly introduced, and Westerners helped transform Shanghai into a metropolis. British and American businessmen made a great deal of money in trade and finance, and Germans used Shanghai as a base for investing in China. Shanghai accounted for half of the imports and exports of China. The western part of Shanghai grew to a size four times larger than the Chinese part had been in the early 20th century.

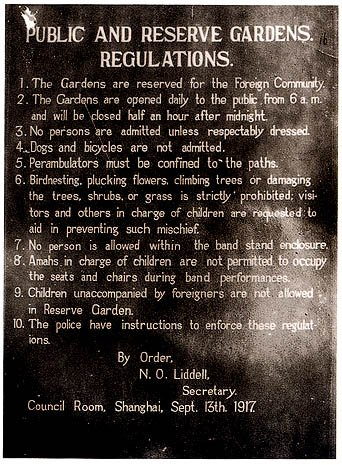
Park regulations, 1917

European and American inhabitants of Shanghai called themselves the Shanghailanders. After problems during its initial few years, the Public Garden north of the Bund – China's first public park and today's Huangpu Park – was for decades reserved for the foreign nationals and forbidden to Chinese natives. The International Settlement was built in the British style with a large racetrack at the site of today's People's Square. A new class emerged, the compradors, which mixed with the local landlords to form a new class, a Chinese bourgeoisie. The compradors were indispensable mediators for the western companies. Many compradors were on the leading edge of the movement to modernize China. Shanghai was then the biggest financial city in East Asia.

=== Chinese society ===
Chinese society was divided into native place associations or provincial guilds. These guilds defended the interests of traders from shared hometowns. They had their own dress codes and sub-cultures. Chinese government was hardly organized, for the foreign governments controlled the economy. Instead, society was controlled by the native place associations. The Guangdong native place associations represented the skilled workers of Shanghai. These native place associations belonged to the top of Shanghainese society. The Ningbo and Jiangsu native place associations were the most numerous. They represented the common workers. Some came from the north of China. They were on the bottom rung of the social ladder. Many of them were forced to work as seasonal workers or even mobsters.

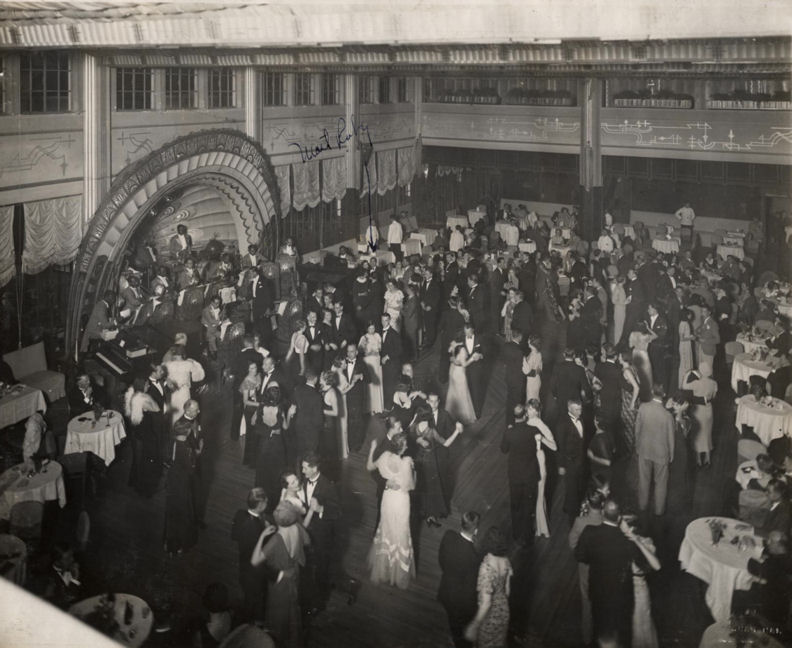
Buck Clayton performing in the 1930s in the Canidrome

=== Shanghai Grand ===
During the 1920s and 1930s Shanghai became known as "The Paris of the East, the New York of the West". Shanghai was made a special city in 1927, and a municipality in May 1930. The city's industrial and financial power increased, because the merchants were in control of the city, while the rest of China was divided among warlords.

Artistically, Shanghai became the hub for three new art forms: Chinese cinema, Chinese animation, and Chinese popular music. Other forms of entertainment included Lianhuanhua comic books. The architectural style at the time was modeled after British and American designs. Many of the grandest-scale buildings on The Bund – such as Shanghai Club, the Asia Building and the HSBC Building – were constructed or renovated at this time. The city created a distinct image that separated it from all other Chinese cities that had come before it.

1930s Shanghai was a center for China's intellectual avant-garde and a center for new ideas.

"Bizarre advertising displays were an everyday reality ... though I sometimes wonder if everyday reality was the one element missing from the city", British novelist J. G. Ballard, who was born and raised in Shanghai during this era, recalled in his autobiography. "I would see something strange and mysterious, but treat it as normal ... Anything was possible, and everything could be bought and sold". The experience inspired much of his later fiction.

Economic achievements include the city becoming the commercial center of East Asia, attracting banks from all over the world. When movies and literature depict the golden days of by-gone Shanghai, it is generally associated with this era.

=== Power struggle ===
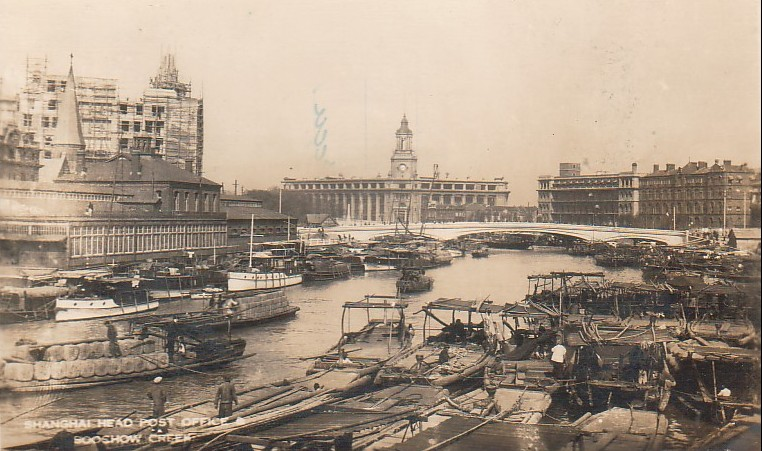
Suzhou Creek around 1920

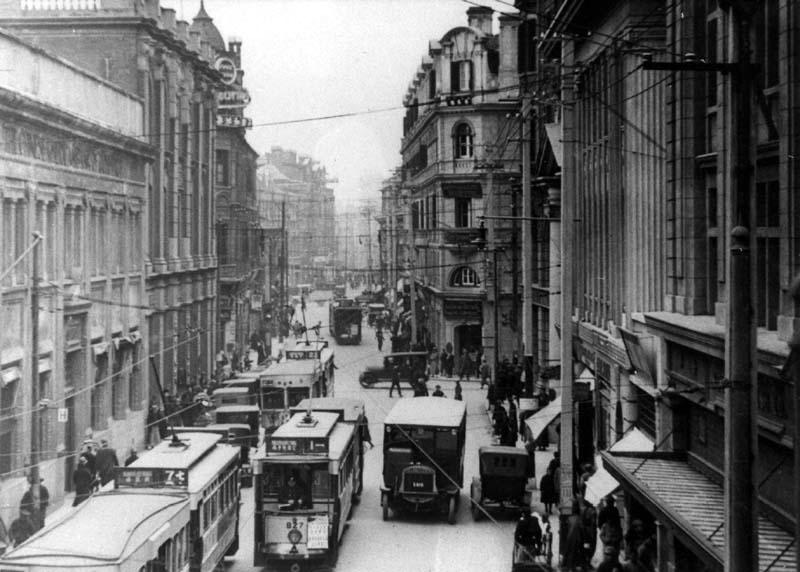
Jiujiang Road, Shanghai, late 1920s

The city was also the center of national and international opium smuggling during the 1920s. In the 1930s, "The Great World" amusement palace was a place where opium, prostitution and gambling came together under the leadership of gangster Huang Jinrong also known as "Pockmarked Huang". Huang was the highest-ranked Chinese detective in the French Concession Police (FCP) and employed Green Gang (Qing Bang) leader Du Yuesheng as his gambling and opium enforcer. The Green Gang became a major influence in the Shanghai International Settlement, with the Commissioner of the Shanghai Municipal Police reporting that corruption associated with the trade had affected a large proportion of his force. An extensive crackdown in 1925 simply displaced the focus of the trade to the neighboring French Concession.

Meanwhile, traditional division of society by native place associations was falling apart. The new working classes were not prepared to listen to the bosses of the same native place associations during the 1910s. Resentment against the foreign presence in Shanghai rose among both the entrepreneurs and the workers of Shanghai. In 1919, protests by the May Fourth Movement against the Treaty of Versailles led to the rise of a new group of philosophers like Chen Duxiu and Hu Shih who challenged Chinese traditionalism with new ideologies. Books like New Youth disseminated the new school of thought, while crime and warlord banditry convinced many that the existing government was largely ineffective. In this atmosphere, the Chinese Communist Party was founded in Shanghai in 1921.

The Nationalist leader Chiang Kai-shek and the Shanghailanders entered into an informal alliance with the Green Gang, which acted against the Communists and organized labor unions. The nationalists had cooperated with gang leaders since the revolution. Although sporadic fighting between gangsters and communists had occurred previously, many communists were killed in a major surprise attack during the April 12 Incident in the Chinese-administered part of Shanghai. Suspected leftists were shot on sight, so that many – including Zhou Enlai – fled the city.

In the late 1920s and early '30s, large residential areas were built north of the foreign concessions. These residential areas were modern, with good roads and parking lots for automobiles. A new Chinese port was built, which could compete with the Shanghailanders' ports. Chiang Kai-shek continuously demanded large amounts of money from the financial world in Shanghai. Most bankers and merchants were willing to invest in the army, but this stopped in 1928. Chiang responded by nationalizing all enterprises. T. V. Soong, Chiang's brother-in-law, chastised his erstwhile relative, writing that it is better to strengthen the party and the economy as well instead of focusing only on the army.

Supported by the progressive native place associations, Chiang Kai-shek's rule turned increasingly autocratic. The power of the gangsters rose in the early 1930s, especially the power of the Green Gang leader Du Yuesheng who started his own native place association. Chiang Kai-shek chose to cooperate with gangsters in order to maintain his grip on Chinese society. This meant that the gangsters remained middlemen during the rule of the nationalists, controlling society by frequently organizing strikes. Mobsters stormed the Shanghai Stock Exchange to gain control over it. No one interfered: the police because they had been dominated by the mobsters since 1919, the Shanghailanders because it was an internal Chinese affair, and the nationalists because they were trying to break the power of the entrepreneurs. The entrepreneurs were forced to make a deal after a second raid.

=== Greater Shanghai Plan ===
In 1927, the government of the Nationalist Government of the Republic of China drew up a plan to develop land in the north east of the city adjacent to the Huangpu River. In 1922, this area had also been earmarked by Sun Yat-sen, founder of the Chinese Republic, as the center of China's development plans with a view to Shanghai becoming a global commercial centre. By 1931, the new Shanghai Special City Government had approved and started work on the Greater Shanghai Plan utilising ideas drawn from British expert Ebenezer Howard's 1902 book Garden Cities of Tomorrow. The grid layout of the new area also followed contemporary trends in European and American urban planning.

== End of Old Shanghai (1937–1945) ==
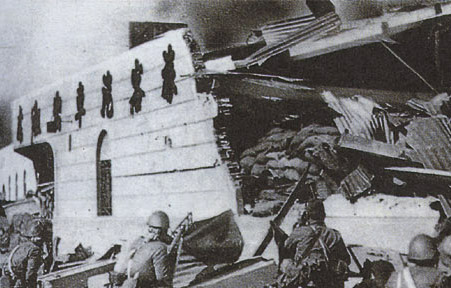
Battle of Shanghai

=== World War II and the Japanese Occupation ===
The Imperial Japanese Navy Air Service bombed Shanghai on January 28, 1932, nominally to crush Chinese student protests against the Japanese occupation of Manchuria. The Chinese fought back in what was known as the January 28 Incident. The two sides fought to a standstill and a ceasefire was brokered in May.

During the Second Sino-Japanese War, the Chinese-controlled parts of the city fell after the 1937 Battle of Shanghai (known in China as the Battle of Songhu). The foreign concessions entered what became known as the "Solitary Island" period. Many foreign institutions, such as banks, continued operating in this areas. With the beginning of the Pacific War, Japan occupied the foreign areas of Shanghai on 8 December 1941. It seized most of the banks in these areas of Shanghai and declared that the Nationalist currency fabi had to be exchanged for bank notes of the Wang Jingwei regime.

Tensions within the city led to a wave of assassinations against Chinese officials who worked with the Japanese authorities: during January and February, 1939, 16 pro-Japanese officials and businessmen were assassinated by Chinese resistance organizations.

Shanghai suffered less than many other cities during World War II, and the Japanese occupiers attempted to maintain many aspects of life as they had been before. The Shanghai Race Club reopened soon after the occupation and continued to host races throughout the war, even after most British and American Shanghai residents were interned. The races continued as late as August, 1945.

During World War II, the extraterritoriality of the foreign concessions provided a haven for visa-less European refugees. The chaos of Shanghai during the war with Japan also meant that there were no customs officials, and therefore refugees (and others) were able to simply pass by the customs house when they arrived in the city. Shanghai was attractive for Jews fleeing Nazi Germany and the threat of Nazi occupation because Jewish communities already existing in China (Baghdadi Jews from the British colonies and Ashkenazi Jews from Russia) welcomed refugees and already had institutions such as synagogues into which Jewish refugees could be incorporated.

Shanghai was, along with Francoist Spain, the only location in the world unconditionally open to Jews at the time. However, under pressure from their ally Nazi Germany, the Japanese removed the Jews in late 1941 to what became known as the Shanghai ghetto, where hunger and infectious diseases such as dysentery became rife. The foreign population rose from 35,000 in 1936 to 150,000 in 1942 (Jewish immigration was 20000-25000 from 1933 to 1941). The Japanese were still harsher on belligerent nationals: Britons, Americans and the Dutch. These slowly lost their privileges and had to wear letters – B, A, or N – when walking in public places; their villas were turned into brothels and gambling houses, and they were finally interned in concentration camps, notably Lunghua Civilian Assembly Center, in 1943. The whole of Shanghai remained under Japanese occupation until the surrender of Japan on 15 August 1945.

After the ending of the Japanese occupation of Shanghai, the poorly-paid Chinese Nationalist forces sometimes engaged in looting.

=== End of the Foreign Concessions ===
Following the attack on Pearl Harbor, the Japanese ended all foreign concessions in Shanghai except for the French. This state of affairs was conceded by an Anglo-Chinese Friendship Treaty in 1943. The French themselves ceded their privileges in 1946 following the end of World War II.

== Post-war transition (1945–1949) ==
=== Economic recovery and the emergence of inflation ===
In the immediate postwar period, Shanghai industries recovered rapidly and resumed production of urgently needed industrial goods, with the textile industry clearly leading other sectors. According to an incomplete survey, Shanghai's registered industrial workforce stood at 335,018 workers in 1947. The textile industry accounted for 62.5% of all industrial workers, involved over 3,900 factories and workshops, and likely possessed approximately three-quarters of the city's total industrial capital.

As the civil war expanded, manufacturers—particularly those in the textile industry—became heavily dependent on imports. Amid accelerating inflation, rising costs of raw materials not only weakened the competitiveness of Shanghai industries but also triggered repeated strikes demanding higher wages.

=== U.S. military presence ===
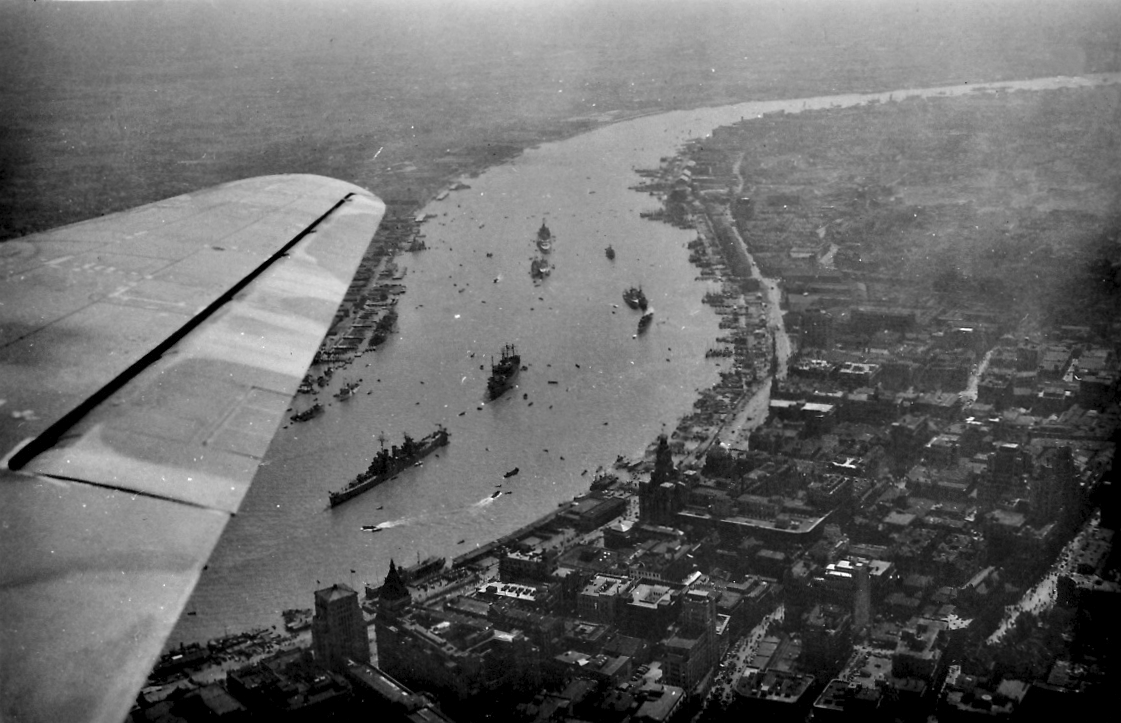
U.S. Navy vessels on the Whangpoo River, November 1945

In the postwar period, substantial U.S. forces were deployed to Shanghai to assist in Japanese repatriation under the U.S. China Theater until it formally ended in mid-1946, though thousands of troops and naval vessels remained stationed in the area throughout the Chinese Civil War.

Some Shanghai residents attributed the American military presence to U.S. interventionism in China, and American military misconduct and traffic accidents fueled anti-American sentiment. In September 1946, rickshaw puller Zang Dayaozi (臧大咬子) died at the Lester Hospital the next day after being beaten by U.S. naval sailor Edward Roderick.

Around the same time, some local popular organizations announced a campaign titled "American Troops Quit China Week," though Nationalist authorities restricted the activities. Under wartime agreements, the U.S. Navy acquitted Roderick in a verdict concealed from Chinese authorities, who were thus left without legal recourse. With coverage from leftist and Communist media, Shanghai protesters linked the Shen Chong case and Zang case in anti-American demonstrations in late December 1946 and January 1947.

The U.S. military presence initially boosted Shanghai's service sector—including rickshaws—but ultimately hastened the rickshaw trade's contraction. With the influx of American motor vehicles—especially Jeeps—the number of registered rickshaws in Shanghai fell from 23,066 in March 1947 to 11,029 by August 1948.

=== Social tension ===
In August 1946 alone, the Shanghai government suspended or banned 109 periodicals for failing to complete registration, despite some publications' claims that the authorities had rejected their applications submitted earlier.

On June 2, 1947, anticipating student demonstrations supporting a nationwide anti-civil war movement, the Shanghai Garrison Headquarters permanently shut down Wen-hui pao, Lien-ho wan-pao, and Hsin-min pao, accusing them of "continuously printing news and opinions harmful to military operations, attempting to overthrow the government, and disturbing public order"—publications that had previously covered similar activities. The nationally influential liberal magazine The Observer, which Shanghai intellectuals established in September 1946, also drew the authorities' attention.

=== Popular culture and entertainment ===
By 1949, Shanghai had 52 movie theaters with about 1,000 employees. Postwar runaway inflation caused annual film production to drop from a pre-1945 average of 70–90 titles to just 20–30; Hollywood imports dominant in local exhibition, with a total of 1,896 American films available for screening during this period.

In 1946, the KMT Central Propaganda Department established Film Services and relocated its party-owned Central Film Studio to Shanghai, absorbing most former Japanese-owned facilities. In 1947, these entities were restructured into a corporate enterprise under the nominal leadership of Chang Tao-fan.

The late 1940s also witnessed a brief revival of local private cinema. Kunlun Film Company—which absorbed the United (Lianhua) Photoplay Service in 1947—produced influential progressive melodramas such as Spring River Flows East (1947), Eight Thousand Li of Cloud and Moon (1947), and Myriad of Lights (1948). The departing Nationalist government characterized these works as Communist "United Front tactics", while other studios, including Wenhua, Guotai, and Datong, were similarly regarded as left-leaning.

To escape collaboration trials targeting 108 filmmakers, key figures like producer Zhang Shankun fled to Hong Kong, founding its postwar Mandarin cinema, while writer Eileen Chang turned to screenwriting. Ahead of the 1949 Communist takeover, additional figures relocated to Hong Kong or Taiwan, but most stayed in Shanghai.

=== Disturbances in early 1948 ===
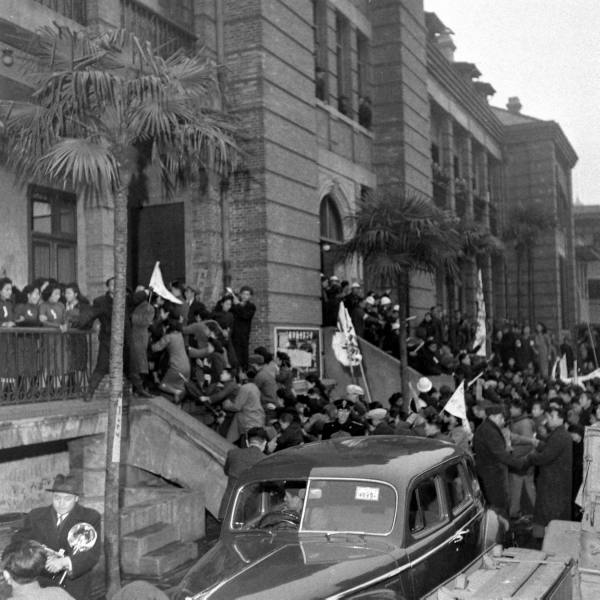
Shanghai dance-hall hostess riot, early 1948

Between January 29 and February 2, 1948, Shanghai experienced a wave of civil disturbances involving students, industrial workers, and service personnel. While Mayor K. C. Wu attributed the violent clashes as "Communist-staged," U.S. Ambassador Stuart reported to Washington that the disturbances were the result of the government's own "alienation of popular support through administrative ineptitude."

In January 1948, students at Tongji University went on strike after several students were expelled for refusing to reorganize the student association in accordance with official directives. On January 29, Mayor Wu was assaulted while trying to persuade students not to travel to Nanjing to protest. Police and garrison troops—about 1,000 in total—surrounded the campus and clashed with students; reports stated that more than 100 students were arrested.

Initiated on January 30, 1948, the Shen Xin No. 9 Cotton Mill strike was suppressed by military force on February 2, leaving three female workers dead, over 500 injured, and more than 200 arrested, culminating in a citywide commemoration on February 22 where some workers and students wore black armbands.

On January 31, around 6,000 dance-hall hostesses rallied at the Shanghai Bureau of Social Affairs against the government's austerity-driven dance hall ban. The protest devolved into a riot after demonstrators forced entry, vandalized offices, and destroyed government property.

=== Chiang Ching-kuo and economic stabilization ===
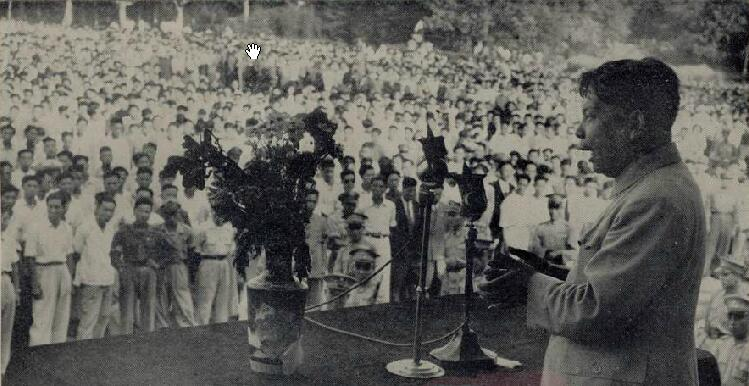
Chiang Ching-kuo delivering a speech to the members of the Shanghai Youth Service Corps, one of the outside organizations used to crack down on "Big Tigers"

As China's financial center, Shanghai served as the focal point of the August 1948 Gold Yuan currency reform. Chiang Kai-shek appointed Chiang Ching-kuo to oversee local economic stabilization. Commercial banks suspended operations for three days to redenominate accounts into the new currency unit, while residents were mandated to surrender all gold, silver, and foreign exchange holdings to state authorities.

Chiang Ching-kuo capped prices at August 19 levels and targeted market speculation. Mobilizing specialized enforcement units and youth groups, he focused regulatory measures on prominent business leaders and major hoarders, locally known as "Big Tigers." Through these stringent measures, Shanghai contributed roughly 64 percent of all gold, silver, and foreign currency collected nationwide during the campaign.

While price controls temporarily stabilized local prices through September, unaligned policies in surrounding regions led merchants to divert goods elsewhere, causing acute supply shortages. Subsequent government restrictions on commodity exports further hampered local manufacturing, while many business leaders relocated to Hong Kong or overseas.

In October, government tax hikes on consumer goods permitted merchants to adjust prices upward, undermining the price ceiling and triggering panic buying. Essential goods vanished from markets, bringing local commerce and industry to a near-standstill. On October 31, price controls were officially abolished.

=== Crisis at the turn of 1949 ===
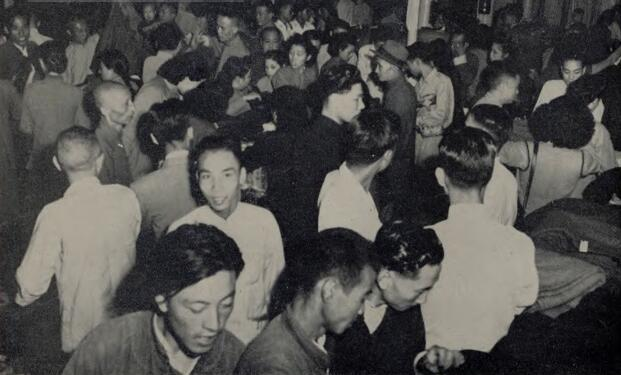
December 1948: Shanghai residents rushing to purchase cloth

Surrounding agricultural producers increasingly refused payment in depreciating Gold Yuan, disrupting grain supplies and causing major urban food riots between November 4 and 10. By late 1948, Shanghai's industrial output fell to 50–60 percent of early-1948 levels, and commercial transactions largely transitioned from paper currency to a barter system.

By December 1948, the authorities ordered The Observer to cease publication, and Chiang Kai-shek personally ordered the arrest of staff members. The Shanghai municipal government's press office had summoned its editor Chu Anping in March 1948 and shown him a warning notice from the Ministry of Interior.

In early 1949, the Gold Yuan depreciated rapidly. Shanghai's price index rose from 2,199 in late November 1948 to 3,483 in early January 1949, before reaching 35,774 in early February and exceeding 3,000,000 by April.

The Republic of China Army had vowed to make the city "China's Stalingrad" the way it had previously contested Imperial Japanese control in 1937 but, having lost 153,000 men of its defending force of 210,000 in the city's outer districts, it was unable to sustain subsequent street-to-street fighting in the central districts, leading some scholars like Dikötter to consider their resistance "minimal".

== Last Phase of Civil War and early PRC (1949–1952) ==
=== Initial administration ===
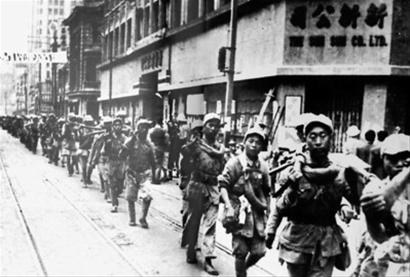
People's Liberation Army troops entering Nanjing Road on May 25, 1949.

In the last phases of the Chinese Civil War, the Shanghai Campaign brought the urban core of the city under the control of Chen Yi's People's Liberation Army and the Chinese Communist Party on May 25, 1949. The districts immediately north of Suzhou Creek were taken the next day and the entire present municipality, including Chongming Island, by early June.

In early 1949, the US Economic Cooperation Administration supplied nearly 60% of the city's basic food needs and the raw cotton required for its major textile industry. Facing delayed interior grain shipments until the autumn, the Communist Shanghai Military Control Commission introduced trade regulations on June 6 to mitigate shortfalls, allowing merchants to finance imports with private foreign currency, releasing detained customs cargo, and permitting exporters to honor prior contracts.

=== Nationalist "blockade" and air raids (1949–1950) ===
In June, the Nationalists announced a port closure targeting Communist-controlled areas, including the port of Shanghai. Republic of China Air Force planes bombed and strafed the British merchant ship SS Anchises in the Whangpoo River on June 21. British authorities described it as "entirely unwarranted", and lodged a protest against the raid. Meanwhile, the Nationalist Navy forcibly intercepted foreign vessels attempting to enter or leave Shanghai, leading several shipping companies to suspend their routes to the city by late 1949.

Following the PLA's takeover of Shanghai, Nationalist air forces launched multiple airstrikes on the city. On January 25, 1950, a raid by twelve B-24 bombers resulted in approximately 400 civilian casualties and property damage. A subsequent attack on February 6 involving fourteen bombers reportedly caused 1,448 casualties (including 860 injured), and disrupted municipal water and electricity services, leading local radio to declare a state of emergency.

On February 10, the U.S. forcefully protested repeated, "deliberate" Nationalist bombings of American property in Shanghai, particularly the Shanghai Power Company, as the use of U.S.-supplied aviation equipment in these raids damaged American standing in China.

After the Sino-Soviet Treaty was signed, the USSR secretly deployed a combined-arms air defense task force under Lieutenant General Batitsky—codenamed Pravitel'stvennaya Komandirovka (Правительственная командировка, "Government Trip")—to secure the airspace over Shanghai and adjacent regions. A combination of Soviet air defense support and the PLA's subsequent capture of the Zhoushan brought Nationalist air raids against Shanghai to an end.

=== Suppression of counter-revolutionaries ===
Places such as the Canidrome were transformed from elegant ballrooms to mass execution facilities. This included the mass arrest of thousands of vagrants, criminals, and rickshaw drivers beginning in December 1949, alongside a broader crackdown on gambling and prostitution.

=== Economic reorganization and the Three-Anti and Five-Anti campaigns ===
Many foreign firms moved their offices from Shanghai to Hong Kong, specifically North Point, whose Eastern District became known as "Little Shanghai". Although the Communists initially tried to allow the city relative autonomy, its economy declined due to Nationalist closure policy and Communist restrictions on foreign trade.

As a major industrial center, Shanghai's state and private industrial sectors benefited economically from wartime processing contracts in 1950–51. However, subsequent accusations of defective products and illegal practices during wartime production became grounds for the Three-anti and Five-anti campaigns, with the Five-anti campaign in early 1952 particularly causing stagnation in the city's private industry.

Few Shanghai private entrepreneurs were formally charged with violations during the Five-Anti Campaign. However, the campaign's reliance on mass mobilization and public scrutiny exposed business owners to worker criticism, oversight, and denunciation, creating substantial psychological pressure. Simultaneously, increased worker wages and welfare expenditures strained cash flow in some private enterprises. Records document suicides among some entrepreneurs, senior employees, and their family members in early 1952.

=== Urban transformation and public life ===
Before taking over Shanghai, Mao had already requested Soviet assistance in sending experts specialized in managing the city. In 1950, under the guidance of Soviet planner M. G. Barannikov and others, a draft plan was drawn up setting the primary goal of transforming the city from a "consumer city" into a "producer city"—a mandate that was largely carried forward by subsequent plans.

The Shanghai Racecourse, recognized as a popular anti-colonial cause, was reclaimed by municipal authorities in 1951. Its northern section was converted into People's Park, while the southern area was transformed into a square that subsequently served as the primary venue for holiday celebrations and mass demonstrations.

Former residential buildings within the complex were repurposed as the Shanghai Library; the old Central Trust Bank building became the Shanghai Museum; the Canidrome with its stands was redesigned as Culture Square; the Shanghai Cotton Exchange was converted into the Museum of Natural History; and the Shanghai Race Club was transformed into the Shanghai Art Museum. Additionally, the memorial to French aviator René Vallon in Fuxing Park was replaced with a statue of Lu Xun.

== Socialist transformation and First Five-Year Plan (1953–1957) ==
=== Industrial transfer and workforce mobility ===
Following 1950s mergers and relocations in higher education, the higher-education institutions in Shanghai decreased from 43 in 1949 to 19 in 1957. Relocated institutions included the predecessors of Northwestern Polytechnical and Tongji Medical universities. Although the decision to move Jiaotong University to Xi'an was reversed in 1957, part of the university had already relocated; Xi'an Jiaotong University was subsequently established there.

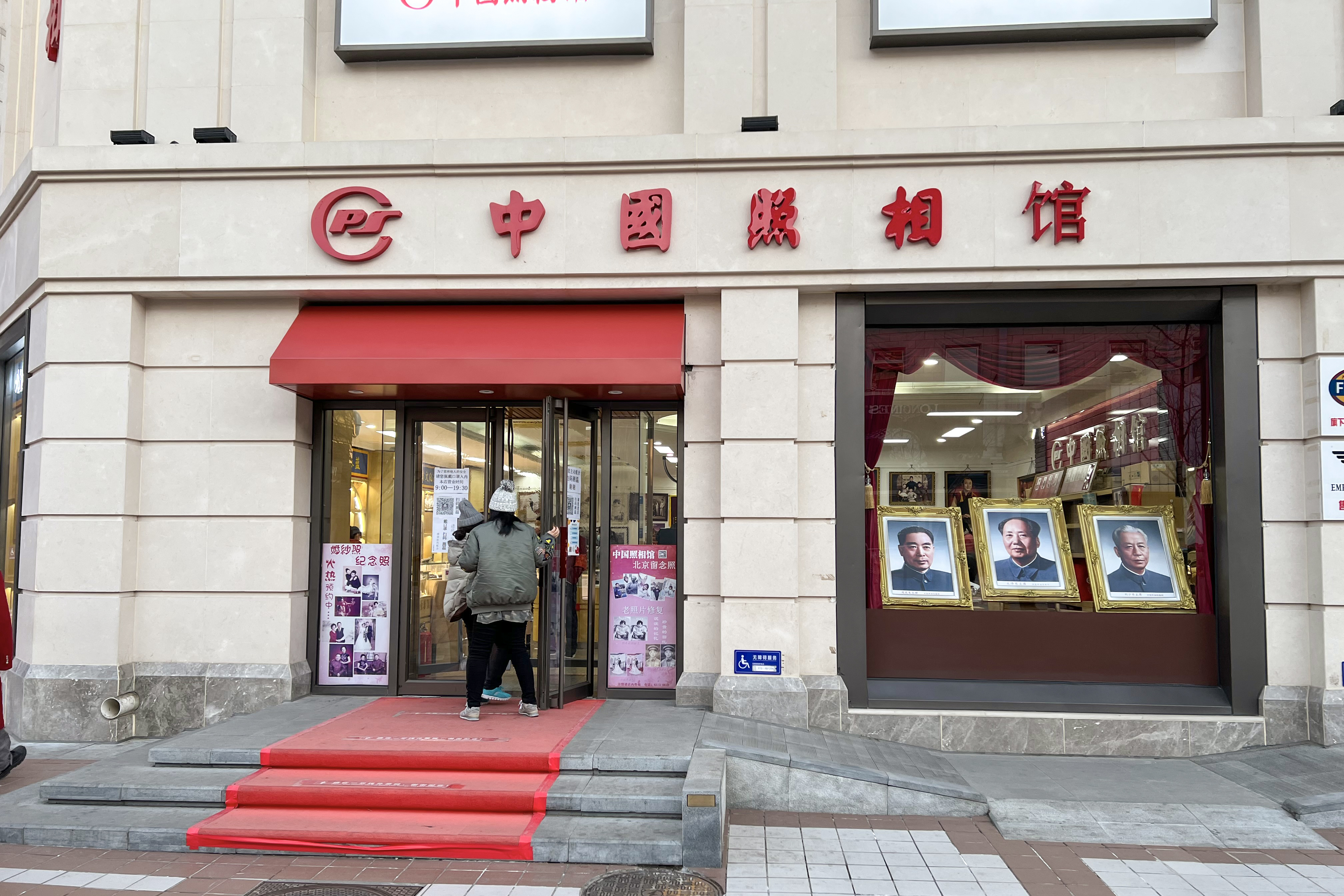
The storefront of China Photo Studio (中国照相馆) in Beijing, one of the Shanghai service enterprises relocated to the capital in 1956.

From 1953 to 1957, Shanghai supported key inland development projects under the First Five-Year Plan by relocating factories and service establishments, undertaking infrastructure and industrial design and construction, and producing required equipment. It transferred 272 light-industrial and textile factories to Gansu, Henan, and other provinces; moved construction machinery and rubber plants to Luoyang; and relocated some handicraft cooperatives, restaurants, clothing shops, photo studios, and barbershops to Xi'an, Lanzhou, Luoyang, and other cities. In total, 217,804 professional personnel were reassigned.

In 1956, Shanghai also moved renowned clothing, photography, hairdressing, laundry, and catering businesses to Beijing under the campaign to expand services in the capital.

=== Social and cultural transformations ===
Following the 1949 handover, former Nationalist state studios were consolidated into the Shanghai Film Studio. Although local private enterprises initially received government subsidies, the 1951 national campaign against The Life of Wu Xun—produced by Shanghai's private Kunlun Studio—accelerated their integration. By 1953, eight private studios were merged into the state-owned Shanghai United Film Studio and ultimately absorbed into the Shanghai Film Studio.

American films were banned in Shanghai in November 1950, following China's entry into the Korean War. Political tensions further restricted local output: six Shanghai-made films were designated as "poisonous weeds" in 1957, and seven more—including Sleepless City (Bu ye cheng), which depicted local national capitalists—were criticized in 1958. Meanwhile, approved Hong Kong films remained popular among local audiences, until non-co-produced Hong Kong films were prohibited in 1963.

=== Urban planning and spatial expansion ===
In 1956, the city began planning industrial satellite towns, completing its first satellite town, Minhang, in 1963.

In September 1951, construction began on Shanghai's first Workers' New Village in Putuo District. Located near western Shanghai's main industrial zone, Caoyang New Village No. 1 (曹杨一村) was completed in May 1952. The initial development comprised 48 two-storey masonry and wood-beam buildings, housing factory "model workers" and "progressive producers." By 1953, the complex expanded to 1,002 households and was designated the "1,002 Households Project." This initiative subsequently served as the template for the municipal "20,000 Households Project," expanding similar worker complexes across Putuo, Yangpu, and Zhabei districts.

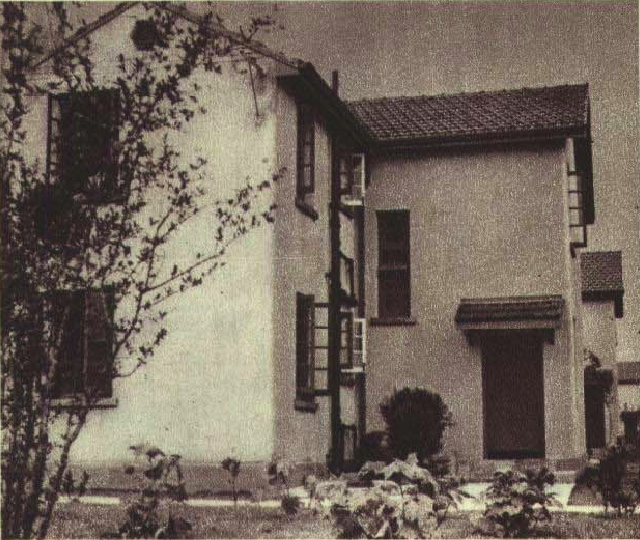
Worker Housing in Caoyang New Village

Shanghai introduced planned rationing of edible oil, grain, and pork in 1954, 1955, and 1956, respectively. To ensure food self-sufficiency, Shanghai was prompted to incorporate its surrounding rural areas.

== Great Leap Forward and adjustment (1958–1966) ==
In 1958, Shanghai underwent significant territorial expansion through administrative reorganization. Baoshan and Jiading counties were incorporated in January; in November, six counties (Songjiang, Chuansha, Nanhui, Fengxian, Jinshan, and Qingpu) were transferred from Suzhou Prefecture to Shanghai. The municipality's administrative area expanded from 636 square kilometers (1949) to 5,910 square kilometers following these adjustments.

Following the 1958 administrative reorganization, Shanghai's external grain purchases declined from 1.5 million tons (1957) to 1 million tons (1965). From 1958 onward, surrounding rural areas could no longer supply sufficient vegetables to the urban core, forcing greater reliance on suburban production and external purchases; this pressure eased after the administrative division adjustment. By spring 1963, improved food supplies enabled the derationing and price reduction of various commodities.

During the Great Leap Forward, Shanghai set inflated industrial targets, including for steel. Despite actual 1957 output of roughly 500,000 tons, targets were set at 1.2 million (1958), 1.8 million (1959), and 2.5 million tons (1960). Beyond inflated reporting, much of the resulting output was low-quality and inefficiently produced. Following adjustment, output fell to 1.8 million tons (1961) and 1.2 million tons (1962).

Concurrently, migration to Shanghai became easier, and the city's expansion of low-wage temporary and contract positions drew large numbers of rural workers seeking employment; registered population in the built-up urban area alone exceeded 6 million. During the subsequent retrenchment, however, many were required to return to their home villages and towns.

Between 1958 and the mid-1960s, the number of technical personnel in Shanghai's industries nearly doubled, yet over the same period the number of technical graduates produced was roughly tenfold the number of new technical positions created.

Between 1962 and 1968, thousands of unemployed urban youth were sent by the Shanghai government to nearby Chongming Island to develop state farms.

== Cultural Revolution era (1966–1976) ==
=== The Third Front for Shanghai ===
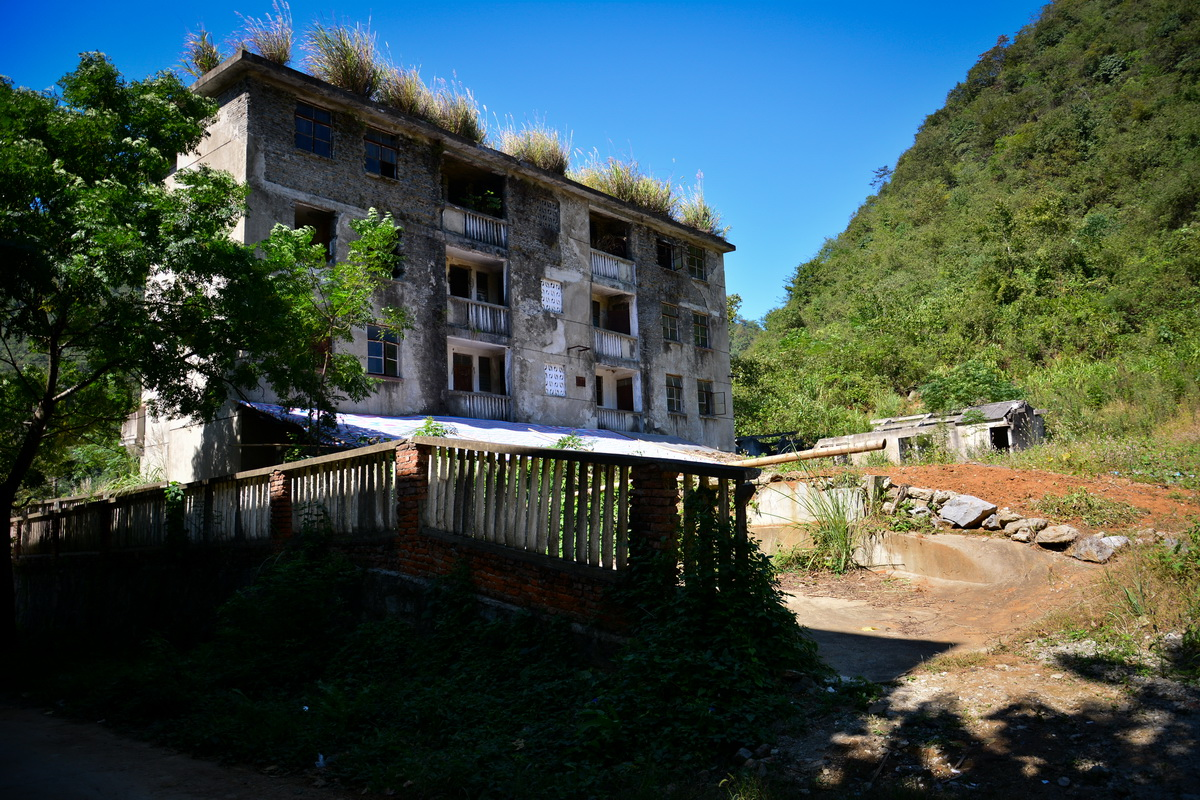
The former residential quarters for workers of a Shanghai Small Third Front factory, located in Guichi, Anhui

Due to Cold War security concerns over its exposed coastal location, Shanghai began relocating industrial enterprises in 1964 under central directives. Over 354,900 people were mobilized to western China for the "Big Third Front" and nearby provinces for the "Small Third Front."

Shanghai's Small Third Front grew into the largest of its kind nationwide, with its greatest concentration in southern Anhui alongside sites in Jiangsu, Zhejiang, and Jiangxi. At its peak, it encompassed 81 work units, 54,000 workers, and 17,000 family members, supported by dedicated schools, hospitals, and transport infrastructure.

Although political turmoil during the Cultural Revolution temporarily halted projects and returned workers to Shanghai, construction and production resumed in 1969, with the system expanding throughout the 1970s.

== Early reform era (1976–1992) ==
=== 1988 hepatitis A epidemic ===
In the first quarter of 1988, a major epidemic of hepatitis A associated with the consumption of raw clams (Anadara kagoshimensis) broke out in Shanghai. Around late 1987 and early 1988, large quantities of blood clams harvested from the coastal waters of Qidong were contaminated with hepatitis A virus (HAV) and sold to Shanghai and surrounding regions, during which an estimated 30% of the city's residents consumed them.

In late December 1987, a clam-related outbreak of infectious diarrhea occurred in Shanghai—which was later confirmed to be bacillary dysentery—prompting the government to ban the sale of these special clams. However, due to the virus's incubation period, the surge in cases began on January 20 1988, ultimately resulting in approximately 300,000 reported cases (accounting for about 4% of the city's total population at the time) and a total of 32 deaths.

The low case-fatality rate (10.9 per 100,000) was considered the result of early intervention, as approximately 100,000 hospital beds were mobilized across medical facilities in the city shortly after the outbreak began.

== Contemporary era (1992–present) ==
Although political power in Shanghai has traditionally been seen as a stepping stone to higher positions within the PRC central government, the city's modern transformation really did not begin until the third generation General Secretary of the Chinese Communist Party Jiang Zemin came to power in 1989. Along with his premier Zhu Rongji, Jiang represented the politically right-of-center "Shanghai clique", and began reducing the tax burden on Shanghai. Encouraging both foreign and domestic investment, he sought to promote the city – particularly the Lujiazui area of Pudong – as the economic hub of East Asia and gateway to the Chinese interior. Since that time, Shanghai has led China's overall development and experienced continuous economic growth of between 9–15% annually – arguably at the expense of Hong Kong.

Shanghai is China's largest and greatest commercial and industrial city. With 0.1% of the land area of the country, it supplies over 12% of the municipal revenue and handles more than a quarter of total trade passing through China's ports. Its year 2010 population, according to China's latest census, was 23.02 million and represented an increase of 6.61 million from the 2000 census.

The average size of a family in Shanghai declined to fewer than three people during the 1990s, and it is clear that most of Shanghai's population growth is driven by migration rather than natural factors based on high birth and fertility rates. Shanghai has for many years had the lowest birth rate in China, a rate lower than large American cities such as New York.

As with most cities in China, Shanghai is overbounded in its administrative territory. The city in the year 2010 was composed of 16 districts and one county, together occupying 6,340.5 square kilometers (2,448.1 mi^{2}) of land area. Chongming contains substantial rural land and a number of rural residents who continue to farm for their livelihood. The city has the highest population density of all the first-order administrative units in China, with 3630.5/km^{2} (9402.9/sq mi) in 2010. Owing to its continued growth and industrial and commercial development, Shanghai also has the highest index of urbanization among all of China's first order administrative units, with 89.3% of the official population (20.6 million) classified as urban.

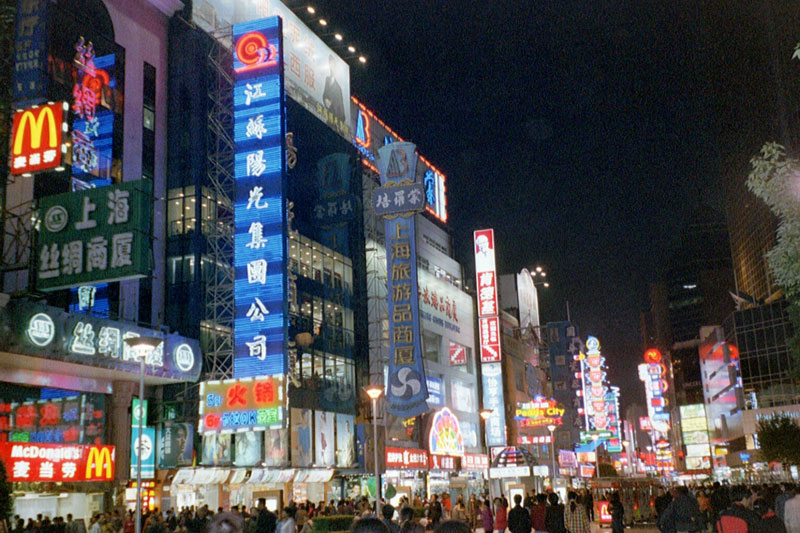
Nanjing Road in Shanghai in 2003

The amount of building activity in Shanghai fueled by government investment expenditures continues to be astounding. Since the 1980s, Shanghai's economy shifted from over 77% of gross domestic product in secondary sector manufacturing to a more balanced sectoral distribution of 48% in industry and 51% in services in 2000 and 2001. Employment in manufacturing reached almost 60% in 1990 and has declined steadily since to 41% in 2001, while employment in the tertiary sector has grown from 30% in 1990 to more than 47% in 2001.

The rapid growth in population, factories and motor vehicles has generated environmental issues. Experts say the chief problems involve air and water pollution and the accumulation of solid wastes.

Shanghai's One City and Nine Towns initiative, which began in 2001, sought to encourage decentralisation and develop ten attractive suburb settlements to improve the housing supply. The municipal government viewed this approach as contributing to the city's development as a "mega-international city" and it was designated as the flagship urban development program for China's Tenth Five-Year Plan (covering 2001–2005).

== See also ==
- Shanghai urban planning
- Timeline of Shanghai history
- The Shanghai Document, a documentary film portraying Shanghai in the early 1920s
