= Shanghailander =

Foreign resident of old Shanghai.

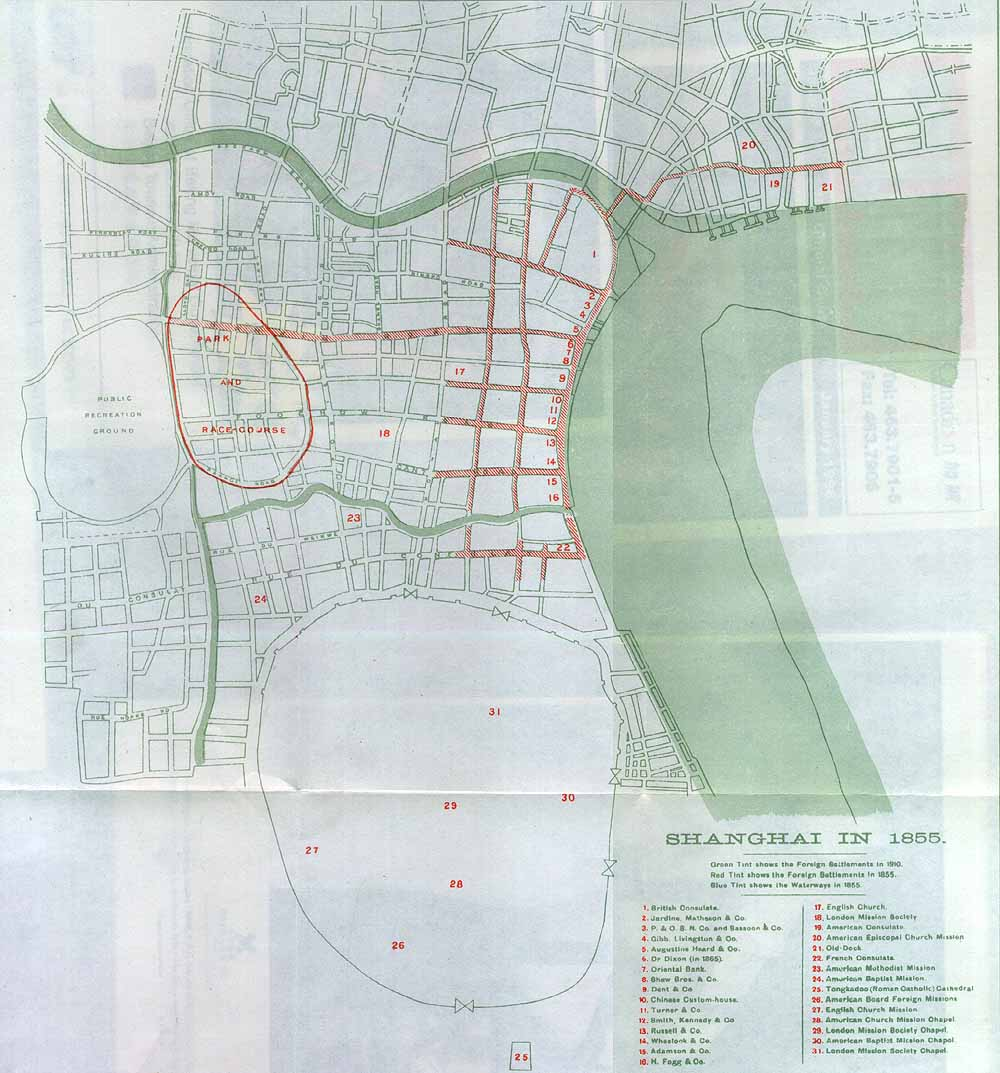
A map of the foreign concessions of Shanghai in 1855 (in red), overlaid (in green) with the contemporary street pattern in 1910.

Shanghailanders (Note: Sometimes "Shanghighlanders" in punning reference to the Scottish highlanders.) were foreign – principally European and American – settlers in the extraterritorial areas of Shanghai, China, between the 1842 Treaty of Nanjing and the mid-20th century.

== Overview ==
Originally privileged by the "Unequal Treaties" and housed in the International Settlement and French Concession away from the Chinese city in the 1800s, they lost most of their status during and after the Japanese occupation of Shanghai in World War II. A 1943 Sino-British Friendship Treaty abandoned the treaty port system, and by this time most American, British, and Dutch Shanghailanders had been deported to concentration camps by the Japanese.

The concessions' extraterritorial zones proved a haven, however, to refugee Jews lacking visas. World War II saw a community of about 18,000 develop, principally from Germany and Austria. After World War II, the majority moved on to the United States or Israel. See History of the Jews in China for more.

== Famous Shanghailanders ==
- J. G. Ballard
- Werner Michael Blumenthal
- Margot Fonteyn
- Ayya Khema
- Walter Henry Medhurst
- Jakob Rosenfeld
- Franziska Tausig
- Denton Welch

== See also ==
- Shanghai ghetto
