= Greater Shanghai Plan =

1927 Plan for Shanghai developed by the Republic of China

Planned Greater Shanghai government complex

The Greater Shanghai Plan (simplified Chinese: 大上海计划; traditional Chinese: 大上海計劃; pinyin: Dà Shànghǎi Jìhuà) was a 1927 plan for the city of Shanghai, China, drawn up by the Nationalist Government of the Republic of China in Nanjing. It was presented at the 123rd meeting of the Shanghai City Government in July 1929 and as one of its provisions allocated 7,000 mu (~4.6 km^{2}) in the modern day Jiangwan Subdistrict of Shanghai's Yangpu District for the construction of a government headquarters and administration centre. Had it been completed, the government headquarters building would have stood close to the junction of today's Hengren Road (恒仁路) and the Qingyuan Ring Road (清源环路) (31.3131°N 121.5255°E).

Following the Battle of Shanghai in 1937, implementation of the plan stopped. By October 1938, the Empire of Japan had come up with their own "Greater Shanghai Metropolitan Plan" (Chinese: 上海大都市计划; pinyin: Shànghǎi Dà Dūshì Jìhuà), which was a modified version of the original. When the Second Sino-Japanese War ended in 1945 with the Japanese surrender, the Nationalist Government returned to power. It did not continue with the plan but instead constructed a number of new roads and repaired damaged buildings. From then until 1952, land previously allocated under the plan was gradually subsumed by development of the Jiangwan District.

== Background ==
After China was defeated by Great Britain in the First Opium War, Shanghai was among the five treaty ports for the Western powers under the unequal treaties. Shanghai's central areas near the Huangpu River developed into a commercial hub. The foreign concessions were governed by municipal bodies established by the Anglo-Americans and France, Russia, and Japan. Around the colonial core of the city, the Chinese controlled areas also expanded and drew internal migration from elsewhere in China. Urban governance in this period was inconsistent and there was almost no city planning.

Sun Yat-sen's 1924 Outline of the Foundation of the Nationalist State aimed to reclaim control of transportation and trade from foreign entities.

In July 1927, the Nationalist Government headquartered in Nanjing under Chiang Kai-shek established the Shanghai Special City Government (上海特别市政府). The Nationalist government viewed Shanghai as a special city and sought to establish an exemplary municipal government, which it hoped would help it unify the city under Chinese administration. The city remained remarkably prosperous despite tripartite struggles between Nationalist, Communist and warlord factions in various parts of China, largely on the account of the International Settlement and the French Concession. The Nationalist-controlled Chinese walled city in the Nanshi area and the northern Zhabei District were small in comparison to the areas under foreign administration, held a burgeoning population and were unsuitable for expansion. As a result, the Nanjing Government considered large scale redevelopment a key task and in July 1929 decided to proceed with the acquisition of land northeast of the city adjacent to the Huangpu River. In 1922, this area had also been earmarked by Sun Yat-sen, founder of the Chinese Republic, as the center of China's development plans with a view to Shanghai becoming a global commercial centre. By 1931, the new Shanghai Special City Government had approved and started work on the Greater Shanghai Plan, utilising ideas drawn from British expert Ebenezer Howard's 1902 book Garden Cities of To-morrow. The grid layout also followed contemporary trends in European and American urban planning.

== Plan detail ==
The development plan focused on creating a new urban center in the Jiangwan area, which had mostly flat land that could be developed at low cost and where it was hoped that a new urban center could rival the foreign-controlled urban core of Shanghai. The plan sought to avoid the foreign-controlled areas while being strategically placed between the train station in Zhabei District and the proposed new port in Wusong (near the mouth of the Huangpu River).

The major elements of the plan were divided into four sections:

- City center plan: The Civic Center district was planned as the center of development and was the initial phase. Comprising 1,000 mu (~ 0.66 km^{2}) and shaped like the stylized Chinese character zhong (中) meaning "centre", this area would contain government buildings each with its own exercise area. The plan included the public structures of a city hall, administrative complex, library, conservatory, hospital, and sports complex.
- A railway line connecting the city centre with a port on the Huangpu River and a railway line with goods depot near modern-day Qiujiang Road (Chinese: 虬江路).
- Division of the city into zones with the central area surrounded by industrial and residential areas.
- Traffic system:

A grid of high speed roads leading out from the central government buildings in the centre to the west and south with a web of interconnected roads to the north and east.
Construction of Zhongshan North (中山北路) and Zhongshan West Road (中山西路) leading to the southern downtown area and Qimei Road (其美路), modern day Siping Road, (四平路) and Huangxing Road (黄兴路) connecting to the International Settlement in the north west.
A further 23 roads leading to Pudong, Jiangqiao and other local areas.

== Implementation ==
=== Funding ===
Once implementation of the plan began, the Nationalist Government issued bonds to cover the necessary construction funds. In 1929 they floated the First Phase Municipal Bond to raise 3,000,000 Chinese yuan based on marketable land values of between 200 and 600 yuan per Chinese acre. A land tax was further levied on the 5,400 mu that made up the proposed city centre area. Outside of this area, a surplus 829 mu of land was divided into two grades and sold for 2,500 yuan and 2,000 yuan per mu respectively, generating a profit of 1,795,560 yuan.

=== New city hall ===
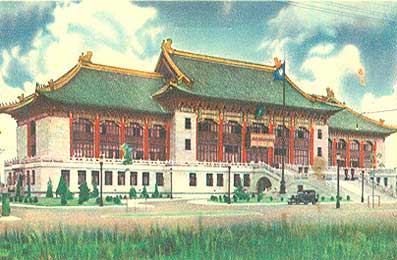
Shanghai City Hall in the 1930s

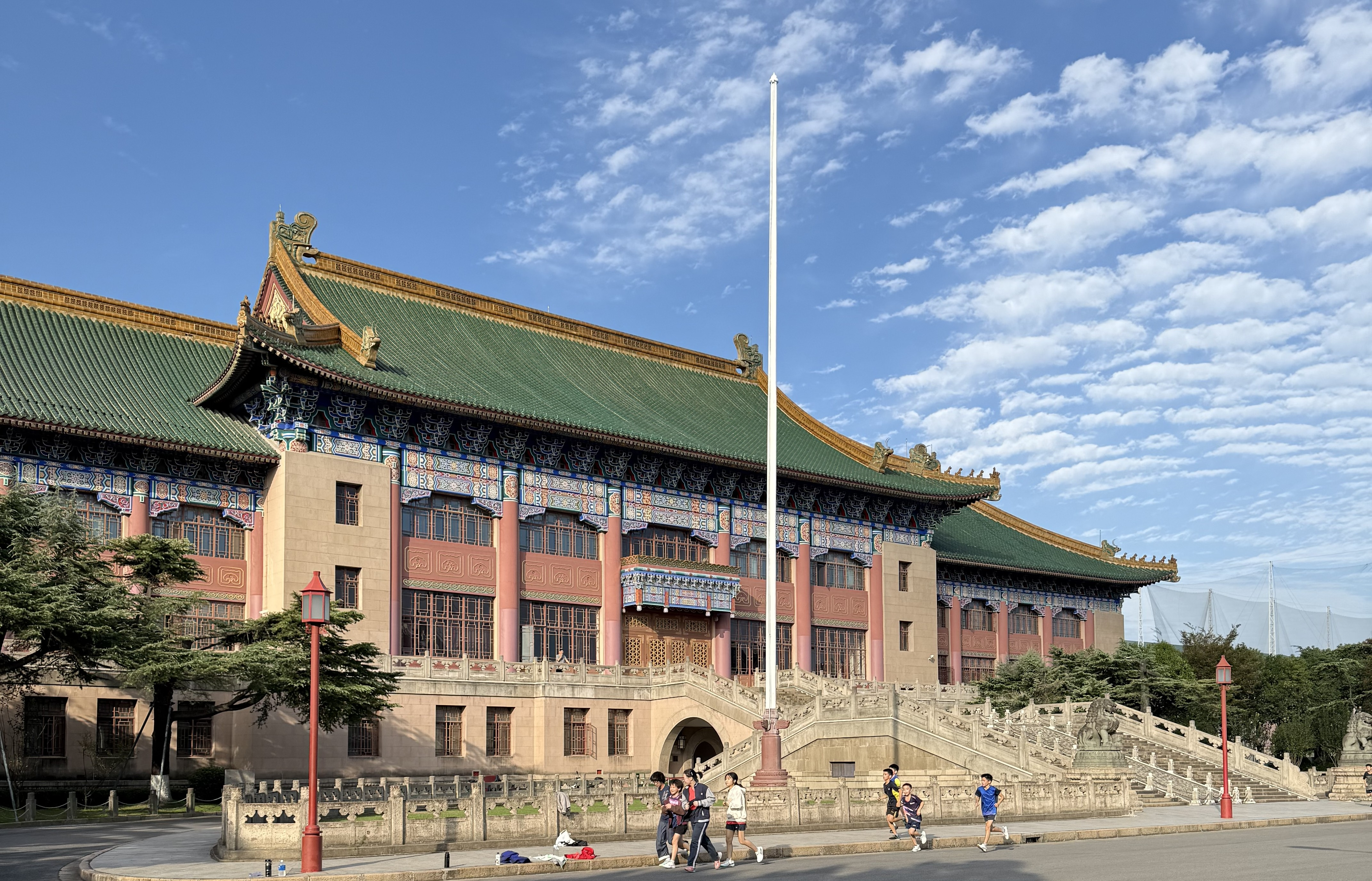
The same building in 2025

The 1,000 mu site earmarked for the new Shanghai City Hall lay at the centre of the planned city. On 1 October 1929 a design competition for the new building was launched with a prize of 3,000 yuan. The government announced architect Dong Dayou (董大酉) as the winner in February 1930 while further amendments were made to the overall plan. Work officially began on the site in June 1931 and was scheduled for completion the following year. However, Chinese nationalist forces clashed with the Japanese army in the January 28 Incident as Shanghai came under attack and the area between the Wujiaochang District (the modern day Yangpu District) and the Huangpu River, at the heart of the construction project, became a battlefield. Work ceased until the announcement of a ceasefire in March 1932 then in July the project restarted and was formally completed on 10 October. Five other buildings were completed at the same time representing a total development area of 8,982 square metres (96,680 sq ft) at a cost of 780,000 yuan. The new complex opened at the end of the year.

=== Other facilities ===
Work on a 300 mu (~200,000 m^{2}) sports field began in August 1934 at the same time as a stadium and a swimming pool nearby. At the end of the same year, construction started on the Shanghai Municipal Library (上海市立图书馆) and the Shanghai Municipal Museum (上海市立博物馆), both designed by Dong Dayou.

=== Interruption of development ===
Ultimately, the Greater Shanghai Plan was interrupted by Second Sino-Japanese War and then ended after the defeat of the Nationalist Government in the Chinese Civil War. Jiangwan remained a peripheral area until the 21st century.

== Legacy ==
The Greater Shanghai Plan is frequently described as a precursor to subsequent new town plans endeavors in China, such as Shanghai's 2001 One City, Nine Towns initiative.

== Notable buildings ==
- Shanghai Nationalist Government Building (中华民国上海市政府大厦)
- Shanghai Municipal Stadium (上海市立體育場) (Now the Jiangwan Sports Center)
- Shanghai Municipal Library (上海市立图书馆)
- Shanghai Municipal Museum (上海市立博物馆)
- Shanghai Municipal Hospital and Health Institute (上海市立医院及卫生试验所)

== See also ==
- Urban planning in Shanghai
- Urban planning in China
- Urbanization in China

== Notes ==
1. Bounded to the north by Zhayin Road (闸殷路), to the south by Xiangyin Road (翔殷路) to the east by Songhu Road (淞沪路) and to the west by the Huangpu River.
