= Asia Building =

Building in Shanghai, China

Coordinates: 31°14′00″N 121°29′28″E

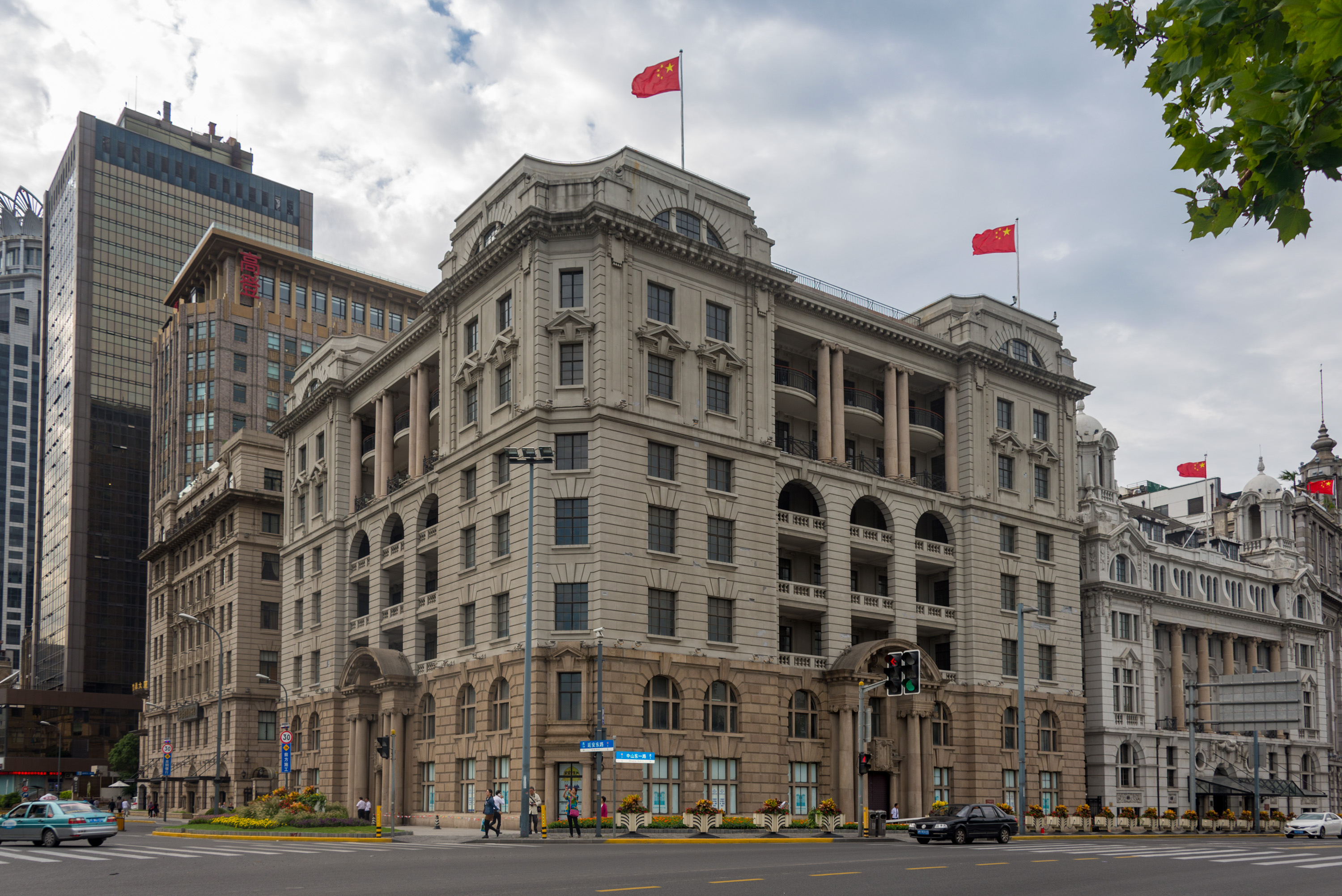
Asia Building

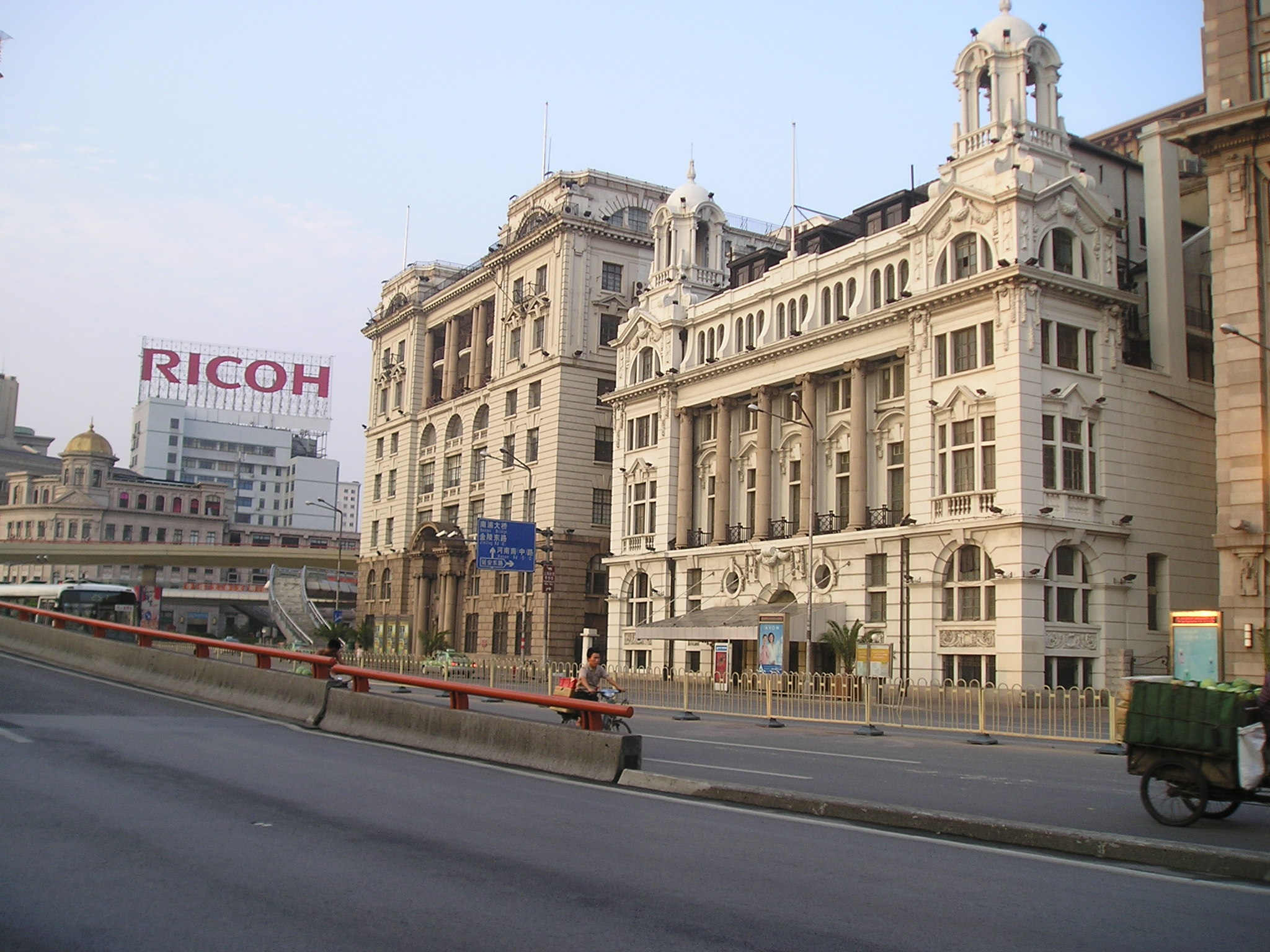
Asia Building on the left

The Asia Building (simplified Chinese: 上海亚细亚大楼; traditional Chinese: 上海亞細亞大樓; pinyin: Shànghǎi Yàxìyà Dàlóu), also known as the McBain Building, the Asiatic Petroleum Building, and more recently as Bund One, is a historic eight-storey building on the Bund in Shanghai, China.

== History ==
The lot of the building originally belonged two British brothers James and Hayes Hogg, whose trading company Hogg Brothers opened in Shanghai in 1861. In 1899 the brothers decided to close their business in Shanghai and return to Britain. They sold the property to British merchant George McBain, whose company constructed this current building after demolishing an original house on the site.

The building was built in 1916 as McBain Building on the corner of the Bund (currently 1 East-1 Zhongshan Road) and Avenue Edward VII (today's East Yan'an Road), a location known as No. 1 on the Bund, near the former French Concession. It stands on a site of 1739 square metres and has a floor area of 11,723 square metres. It was the tallest and one of the largest buildings in Shanghai upon its completion. This fact, adding to its location, earned it a widespread nickname 'Number One Building on the Bund' (外滩第一楼). The building was designed by Moorhead&Halse, a famous architectural firm in Shanghai back then and built by contractor Yu Chang Tai. Initially the building was seven stories tall; an extra storey was added in 1939.

In 1917, one year after its completion the Royal Dutch Shell's Asiatic Petroleum division, which sold kerosene and candles used for lighting before electric lights were invented, bought in much of the building and renamed it the Asia Building.

During the Japanese occupation of Shanghai the building was taken over by the Japanese and most of the staff, mainly British, fled Shanghai and relocated in Chongqing. The majority of them returned to Shanghai and continued working in the building after the occupation while the company's profits soared to unprecedented levels. After the People's Republic of China was established, some branches of the company in China closed down, only some 50 employees remained in Shanghai.

The East China Petroleum Company took control of the building in 1950. A number of other occupants including the Shanghai Metallurgical Designing & Research Institute, Shanghai housing & land administration bureau and Shanghai Silk Company moved in 1959. The Asiatic Petroleum division of Royal Dutch Shell finally ceased operation in the building in 1966, after which the Shanghai Real Estate Department took the building's control.

Two shell-shaped ornaments of the Royal Dutch were removed from a column of the building's façade and relocated to its Beijing Yuanmingyuan office when the company left, now being displayed at the Shanghai History Museum.

The building became the headquarters of the China Pacific Insurance Company in 1996. As of 2015, it was largely empty. In December 2021, Christie's announced its moving to the Asia Building as its new headquarters in Shanghai, and held its first auction there on 1 March 2022. Later in 2022, the Bund One Art Museum (BOAM), a temporary exhibition space, opened with an exhibition of Italian Old Masters as part of a five-years partnership with the Uffizi. BOAM was founded in 2019 as a joint venture of two Shanghai-based companies, Shanghai Tix-Media Co., Ltd. and Shanghai XinHua Distribution Group Co., Ltd.
