= The Shanghai Document =

1928 film

- Directed by: Yakov Bliokh
- Cinematography: V. Stepanov
- Edited by: Albrecht Viktor Blum
- Release date: 1928
- Running time: 54 minutes
- Countries: Germany; Soviet Union
- Language: Silent

The Shanghai Document (Russian: Шанхайский документ) is an early documentary film. This silent film was directed by Yakov Bliokh and was released in the USSR in 1928.

The film portrays Shanghai, China in the early 1920s. It shows the contrasts between the world of Western expatriates (including Britons, Americans, New Zealanders, Australians, and Danes) who live in the luxurious Shanghai International Settlement, and that of the Shanghainese inhabitants, who spend their days laboring.

The events which inspired the film revolve around the Chinese nationalist revolution (1925–27), including the May Thirtieth Movement, and the First United Front of the Chinese Communist Party, and the Nationalists (the Kuomintang), and its collapse in February 1927 when Chiang Kai-shek ordered a purge of the Communists in Shanghai and in other cities held by the revolutionaries.

== Content and main themes ==
Full film

The Shanghai Document depicts the prosperous port town of Shanghai, China in the early 1920s. The film prominently contrasts the wealthy Western expatriates living in the luxurious Shanghai International Settlement and the local Shanghainese poor, who are overwhelmingly rickshaw drivers and factory workers. It captures the socioeconomic inequalities and factory strikes that led up to the events of the Shanghai Massacre on April 12, 1927, expressing sympathy for the working class of the city.

The work is classified as a city symphony film, though it trades the poeticism typical of the genre for an analytical tone. This is evidenced through how its descriptive intertitles highlight and sometimes even mock the visual contrasts between the decadent Westerners and hardworking Chinese.^{2}

The film's cinematography — particularly the focus on movement, extremely varied camera angles, and striking color contrasts — is reminiscent of the visuals of city symphony works by Russian filmmakers such as Dziga Vertov. However, the film is primarily a contribution to the social critique present in contemporaneous Soviet newsreels, depicting the brutality of the workers’ massacre and the Nationalists’ harsh victory against the Communists.^{2}

The Shanghai Document is consistent with the principles of Soviet montage theory. By contrasting the vastly different images of Shanghai's Western bourgeois and the native working class, the film supports a political argument that criticizes the capitalist city's economic disparities.^{1} A notable sequence juxtaposes a garden party in Shanghai's international quarter with scenes of local Chinese children pulling carts on the street, match cutting between a rolling cart wheel and the Westerners’ rotating phonograph. With these stylistic choices, The Shanghai Document enacts a “trenchant social and racial critique.” ^{3}

== Historical context ==
Directed by Russian filmmaker Yakov Bliokh, the film shares common traits with the Soviet propaganda of the time period closely following the end of the Russian Revolution in 1923. Yakov Bliokh worked as a production manager for Sergei Eisenstein’s large-scale film Battleship Potemkin before rising to the status of editor-director, entrusted with sending a film crew to China to collect footage for what would become The Shanghai Document. The film is one of several Soviet productions of the era that sought to depict the imminent political success of communism around the world.^{1}

== Production ==
The detailed history of the actual production process is somewhat lost. It is very likely that Bliokh was never part of the crew that traveled to Shanghai in 1927, which was led by the film's camera operator and co-scenarist V. Stepanov. This group likely arrived in the city to gather propaganda material before the Shanghai massacre in April 1927, but as the film mainly depicts summertime, Stepanov's crew probably did not even begin filming until after the massacre had occurred.^{1}

== Related documentary films ==
Other notable portrayals of this period include André Malraux's La Condition Humaine (The Human Condition, or originally translated as Man's Fate. An early documentary account was Harold Isaacs', The Tragedy of the Chinese Revolution (1938).

(35mm/black and white/silent/54min)
