= Urban planning in China =

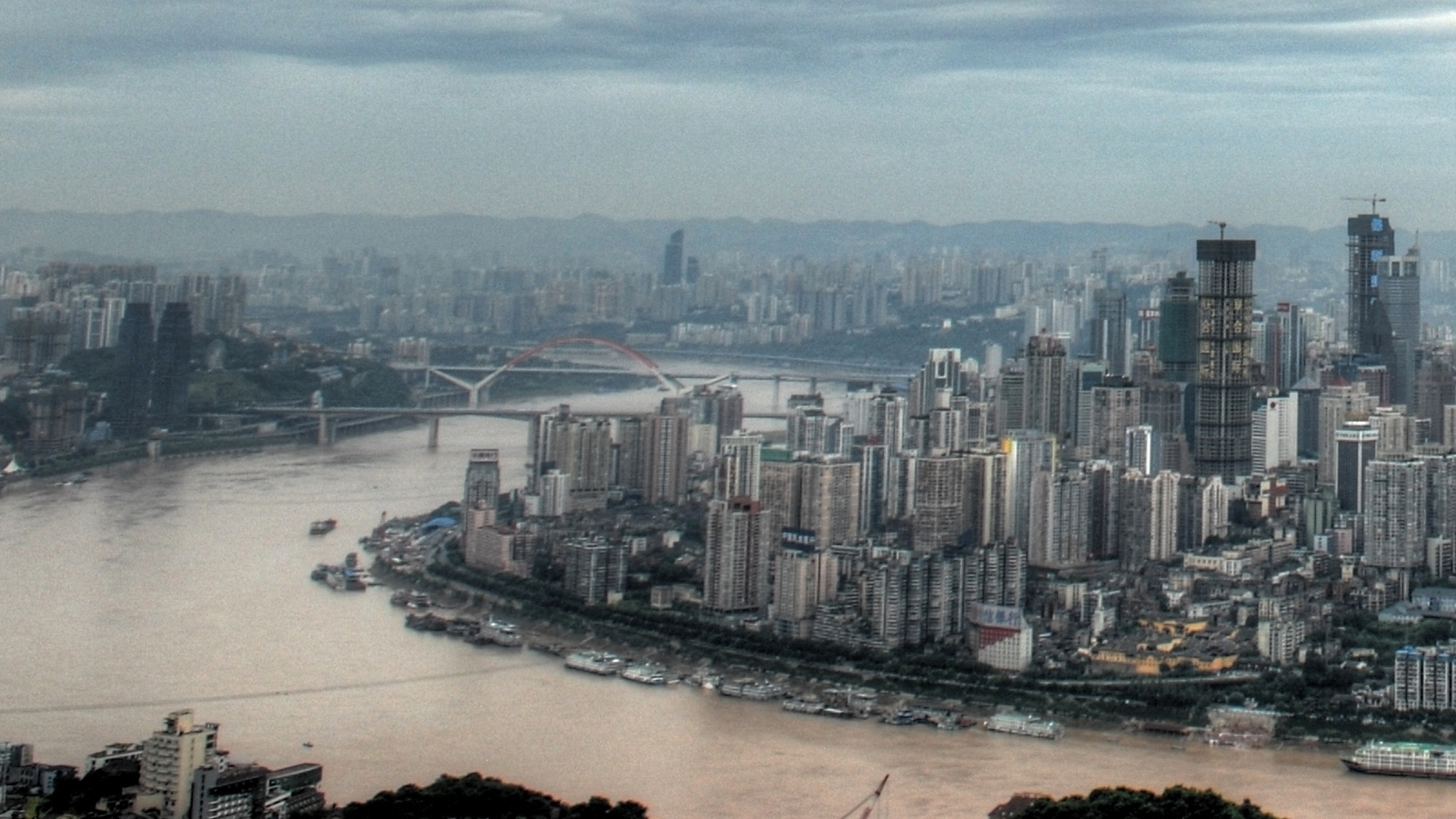
Skyline of the Chongqing city center, one of the largest cities in both China and the world.

Urban planning in the People's Republic of China is currently characterized by a top-down approach, high density urban development and extensive urbanization. The country's urban planning philosophies and practices have undergone multiple transitions due to governance and economic structure changes throughout the nation's extensive history. The establishment of the People's Republic of China in 1949 marks the beginning of three recent historical stages of urban planning philosophies and practice which represent a divergence from traditional Chinese urban planning morphologies and are broadly categorized as socialist, hybrid and global cities.

- Traditional City - walled cities, for example, Xi'an and Beijing's Forbidden City. Traditional cities, were planned in a manner similar to that of present-day, as they were also directly affected by the philosophies, governance and economies of their time. Traditional cities are often planned in accordance with archaic concepts of geomancy, Feng-shui, I-Ching. The Rites of Zhou dating to approximately (1100–256 BC) serve to emphasize the importance of such philosophies, the cardinal directions and harmony between the human and natural realms. China's history is rich with examples of early planning philosophies and practices evidenced by traditional cities such as, but not limited to Chang'an (Xi'an) (西安), Beijing (北京), Nanjing (南京) and Luoyang (洛阳).
- Socialist City - (1950–1980) Planning efforts focused to increase the percentage of blue-collar workers, create affordable housing, urban communes, work unit (danwei 单位), discrete enclosures, broad, central avenues and large squares and Soviet-style exhibition halls. Examples include: Harbin (哈尔滨) and Beijing.
- Hybrid City - (1860–Present) Planning that incorporating western planning and design principles meshed with traditional Chinese street grids and architectural principles. These were often the first cities to develop modern infrastructures networks and include cities such as Shanghai (上海), Shenyang (沈阳) and Tianjin (天津).
- Global City - (1990–Present) Planning aimed to encourage strategic economic development of a region for the purposes of global economic participation as a key node in the globalized market; coined and conceptualized by Saskia Sassen. Global cities are characterized by international familiarity, participation in international events and global affairs, densely populated metropolitan areas, Central Business Districts (CBD) housing key financial, corporate headquarters and national services, extensive public transportation systems, internationally networked airports, large-scale commercial and industrial zones and multiple urban cores. Examples include Beijing, Shanghai, Hong Kong (香港), Guangzhou (广州) and more recently Shenzhen (深圳).

== History ==
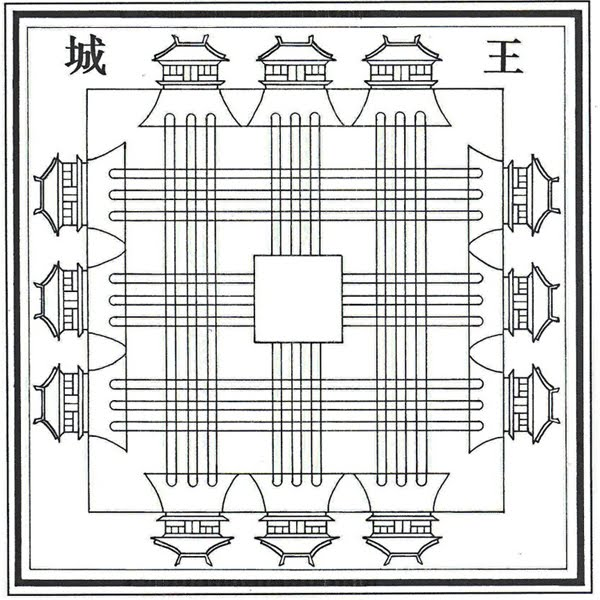
The diagram of Chengzhou's idealized layout from the 1175 Song-era Xinding Sanlitu, based on the Kaogongji descriptions of an ideal capital

China provides one of many examples of how archaic philosophies and their resulting planning decisions have had a profound impact on not only the spatial organization, but the culture of cities and nations of the distant past and present. Planning in China originates previous to that of the very early dynastic times, for example, "the most influential study of an ideal layout for a royal capital" was recorded in the Artificers' Record (Kaogongji) during the Western Han dynasty (206 BC–9 AD) and is thought to have been a replacement for a lost section of the Rites of Zhou created during the Zhou dynasty (1100-256BC). Further, the Rites of Zhou indicate that the origins of the most basic of urban planning philosophies in China are of a more archaic nature relating to concepts of geomancy, Feng Shui and I Ching. The planners of ancient China "imposed an orthogonal and cardinal regimen on the districts, temples, places and streets of its capital cities at least as early as the Zhou dynasty (1122-221 B.C.)" and that the Rites of Zhou confirm the importance cosmologically based philosophies such as directional orientation and symmetry. Santiago Ortuzar indicates that such basic rural and urban planning philosophies may have originated more than 7000 years ago in the Neolithic villages, for example, the Hemudu culture settlements in Zhejiang province. Banpo, a village outside of Xi'an dating to 4500 or 3000 B.C. provides an example of early urban activity centres as 45 dwellings still remain in what could be easily considered high density for the building materials of the time. The traditional walled cities, such as Xi'an were planned in the 7th century AD as the first Chinese capital city under the Sui dynasty. The construction of which was preceded by a regional survey to ensure the flow of water, resources and a strategic location for reasons of health, natural balance and safety; an exercise planners today practice on a daily basis. Xi'an's city walls during the seventh century AD enclosed approximately 80,000 ha and housed an estimated half a million people; an accomplishment even the most prominent European cities failed to achieve until the 19th century; furthering their historical and present value making them entirely relevant to recent planning paradigm shifts of both the East and Western.

It is perhaps best to follow the example of Santiago Ortuzar, Professor of Urban Planning, School of Architecture Central & Mayor Universities, Santiago, Chile, who analyzes traditional urban planning in China by separating urban tradition and urban antiquity; two highly integrated aspects of urban morphology as their origins in Eastern planning are different.

=== Urban antiquities ===
Human settlements in China are considerably older than those of the West, as Neolithic villages in the lower plains of the Yangtze River are approximately 7,500-7,000 years old. Banpo, an early village located on the outskirts of Xi'an, discovered in 1953, may have preceded Xi'an by 1,500 years or more and dates to approximately 5,000 BC. The village, while partially excavated presents considerable evidence of early planning efforts in China as its layout reveals "various land uses (zoning) were allocated and where several activities took place" and further represents "a clear indication of a conscious decision to separate the perilous outside world with a secure internal space" in fashion similar to present towns, cities and global city municipal zoning. Some 45 dwellings and various other structures used for food storage and animal pens compose the site. Further from these structures were work areas, several timber-fired kilns and a cemetery consisting of 250 tombs. Various types of pottery, bone and timber tools were also recovered from the site; reinforcing the spatial usage patterns derived from the layout, remains and other site data. The grouping of such objects in archaeological context further reinforces the level of "sophistication both in terms of spatial and human organisation that can only be classified as a settlement inhabited by a cohesive social group composed of urban dwellers" approximately 5,000 years ago. A second village near Beijing dating to 2,400BC further confirms that similar discoveries such as Banpo "are not isolated examples" of early and intentional urban planning in China.

Chinese settlements, while later than those of the Nile Valley, Indus, Euphrates and Tigris river basins "are undoubtedly some of the worlds first in terms of human evolution and urban character". Ortuzar furthers this statement by indicating that there is "a long urban tradition which stretches far back in time. It has continued to remain uninterrupted for several thousands of years from the very origin of towns until the contemporary city. Few nations can exhibit such continuity over a long period of time".

=== Urban tradition ===
Urban tradition is usually intimately related to urban antiquity. However, in the context of China, it has its own set of attributes in relation to urban planning, design and the social realm. China's population is classified as being approximately 55-60% rural, and in contrast to the majority of western countries, rural inhabitants are not thinly distributed over the landscape on individual land tracts. Rural inhabitants "live grouped together" in hamlets creating an absence of parcel bound dwellings in the countryside. This settlement pattern has existed in China for thousands of years for various purposes including defense from "attacks by bandits, local chieftains and other enemies came together in hamlets. There were practical reasons too, such as the boring of wells to assure themselves of sufficient clean water". This situation appeared much later in European history for similar reasons. Rural Chinese live in small scale urban settlements of "about 500 to 700 persons each" with men traveling daily by horseback or bicycle to a nearby plot of land, while women either accompany their husbands to the fields or attend children or the household. Services, entertainment and social activities are agglomerated in the larger urbanized hamlets that are often planned to service roughly twenty-five surrounding settlements. The resulting geographic and planned patterns of such settlements respond "to regional criteria of urban distribution, something rarely occurring in other cultures". The resulting patterns of living in one area and working in another is considered to be a social characteristic that many Chinese peasants have continued as they gradually urbanize into global city regions and other more urbanized and planned environments. In contrast, European peasants did not begin to urbanize in a similar manner until the advent of modern transportation during the beginning of the Industrial Revolution and arrived in urban areas with little or no urban experience due to the disbursed settlement patterns of the West. Ortuzar furthers, that the urban tradition in China has been ever-present "as its origins can be traced back to the early ages of development; one which is not necessarily bound to the size of towns, nor to the level or degree of urbanization achieved".

=== Modern time ===
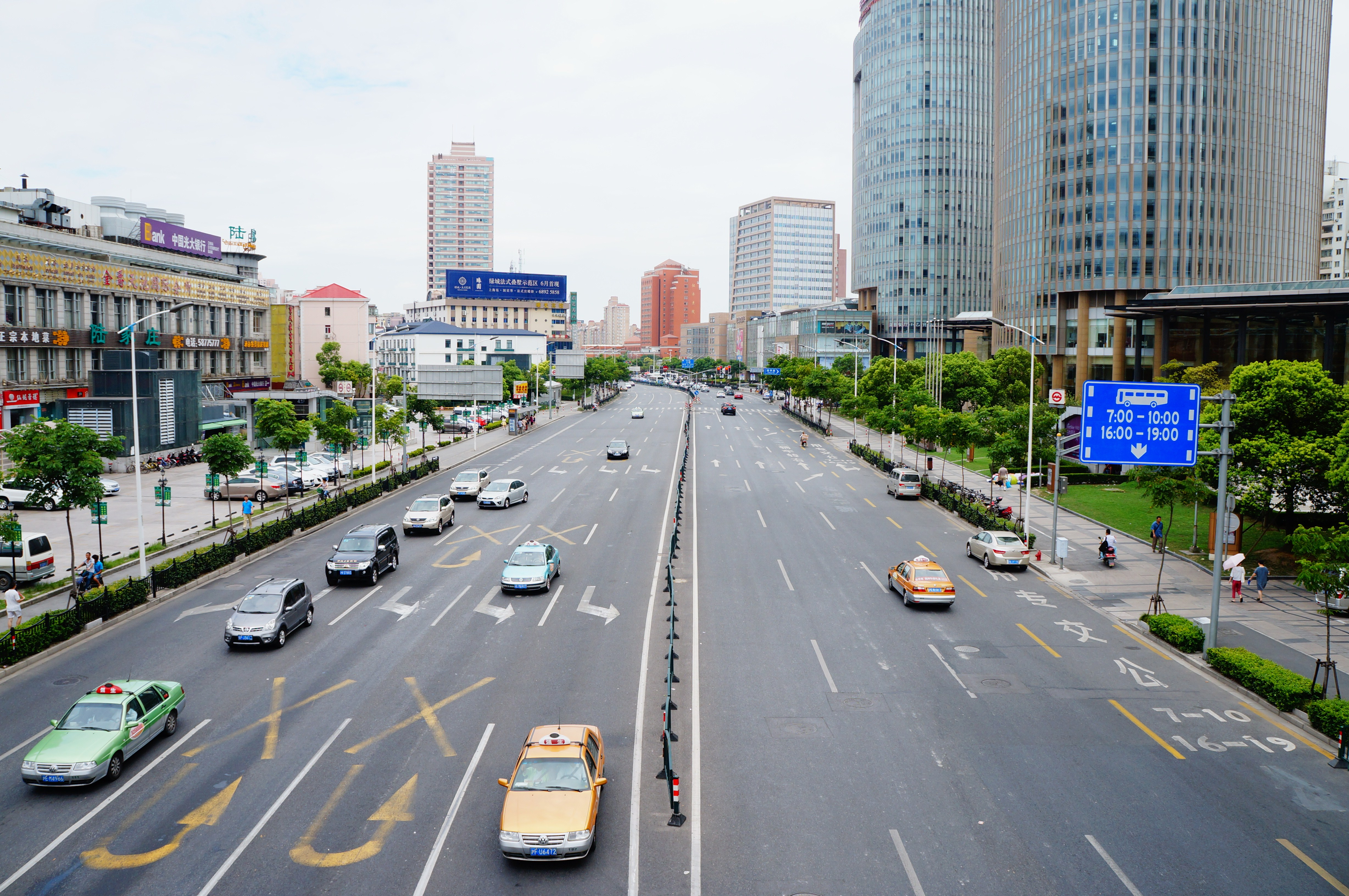
A large boulevard in Shanghai

In 1949, the year that the People's Republic of China was founded, less than 10% of the population in mainland China was urban. Few cities at that time could be considered modern. The early PRC took a cautious approach to urbanization, with its national development strategy citing the principle of "controlling large cities, developing small cities cautiously."

Throughout the Mao Zedong era, Chinese state planners designed urban areas with an explicit purpose of developing a socialist citizenry, including through the construction of work units called danwei, which provided housing, jobs, food, health care, and other elements of the iron rice bowl on-site. In the view of state planners, the design of the danwei would help promote proletarian consciousness. Planners also emphasized the development of public squares and spaces across China. In Beijing, Tiananmen was re-developed from an insular imperial quarter to a larger public space viewed as consistent socialist political. Over the 1950s, the square was quadrupled in size.

During the period of the First Five Year Plan (1953–1957), China's urban planning was heavily influenced by the Soviet Union's experience. Soviet urban planners first came to the PRC in 1949 and returned in 1952 and 1955. Soviet experts helped write China's national standards and guidelines and Soviet text books and regulations were translated into Chinese. In the early part of the 1950s, city plans also followed the socialist city planning principles from the 1935 Moscow Master Plan. These principles included maintaining the old city core as administrative areas while building industry on the periphery with green space and residences between the two. Planning for factories and workers' housing in this period included strong central axes, green belts, symmetrical building placement, parameter blocks, and monumental entrances. Residential buildings were built in a historicist style with traditional Chinese roofs.

Inspired by Soviet disurbanism, China built satellite towns around industrial centers. Industrial-focused satellite towns include seven built by Shanghai in the late 1950s, among which were Minghang (mechanical and electrical), Anting (automotive), Jinshanwei (petrochemicals), and Wusong (steel).

Urban migration stayed below 20%, with city planning primarily supporting urban industries and limiting opportunities for migrating into cities from rural areas. In 1958, The Great Leap Forward shifted the country's focus towards industrialization. Rural people were moved to factory jobs and city dwellings en masse, straining infrastructure. The country recovered slowly.

In 1963, Mao called for "Learning from Daqing in industry, and from Dazhai in agriculture" and this concept became a national directive. The development of Daqing was promoted as a model for industrialisation and town-building.

During the Cultural Revolution (1966 – 1976), urban residents are encouraged or forced to leave for the countryside. Many historical sites were damaged or destroyed during the "Destroy the Four Olds" movement from 1966 to 1968. Subsequently, massive counter-urbanization known as the Down to the Countryside Movement took place, greatly dampening the process of urbanization in China.

Eventually, in 1979, formal urban planning efforts in China were restored and promoted due to the adoption of reform and open policy, causing consistent urban growth. The economic boom ushered in by Deng Xiaoping increased funding to major city planning works, including urban revitalization and renewal projects. Chinese planners in the early Reform and Opening Up period redesigned cities both to accommodate the increasing urban population and increasing economic growth through light industry that produced consumer goods. This process changed urban areas from a focus on production to more livable cities. Architecture of this era was influenced by a re-connection with global designs, including noteworthy examples such as I. M. Pei's the Beijing Xiangshan Hotel.

In 1989, China enacted its first planning law. It established that provincial and municipal governments had responsibility for defining planning areas, preparing urban plans, designating land use, issuing building permits, and enforcing development controls. In its impact on policy, the law facilitated urban and rural integration, expanding city boundaries to include a large amount of rural land, and provided a basis for new town development.

Shanghai established China's first city planning exhibition hall in 2000. City planning exhibition halls later became common in major cities and new towns in China. These exhibit halls showcase planning models and design drawings in an effort to promote development and increase civic pride.

"Themed towns" in China adopt Western-style architecture and urban designs. Among the most significant examples of this approach is Shanghai's One City, Nine Towns initiative, which began in 2001.

During the 1990s and the early 2000s, environmental modeling and zoning concepts became important elements of city planning and management in China. During the subsequent Xi Jinping administration, these techniques were further emphasized.

Following the start of the Eleventh Five-Year Plan in 2006, China introduced a series of policies designed to encourage the development of sustainable cities.

The pace of urbanization in China accelerated in 2008.

The discourse of ecological civilization has influenced the planning and development of eco-cities, low-carbon cities, and green cities in China. In 2013, General Secretary of the Chinese Communist Party Xi Jinping promoted the sponge city concept, a construction and design approach to dealing with heavy rainfall through promoting rainwater infiltration, stagnation, storage, purification, utilization, and discharge. It includes the use of permeable materials in buildings, roads, and open public spaces as well as remediation of natural features such as wetlands or lakes which were blocked or filled during earlier stages of development. China's central government mandates that by 2030, 80% of China's urban space must include sponge city adaptations and must recycle at least 70% of rainfall.

Between 2013 and 2018, Seaside City in Sichuan, China's first fully 'privatised city', was constructed under the aegis of developer Chairman Huang and is home to over 120,000 people.

Under the 2014 National New-Type Urbanization Plan, the Chinese state sought to increase urban-rural coordination by incorporating rural planning as part of municipal governments' planning processes. New-type urbanization has since become a central theme of urban planning and development in China. The 2014 The National New-Type Urbanization plan requires 20% of municipal regions to be zoned as ecological protection areas.

The Thirteenth Five-Year Plan (covering 2016–2020) highlighted nineteen city clusters to be developed and strengthened pursuant to a geographic layout referred to as two horizontals and three verticals (liang heng san zong). The highlighted clusters included the Beijing-Tianjin-Hebei region, the Yangtze River delta region, and the Greater Bay area. Development of these clusters includes establishing regional coordination mechanisms, sharing development costs and benefits, collaborative industrial development, and shared governance approaches to ecological issues and environmental protection.

Before the 2020s, the majority of urban growth generally consisted of outward expansion from city centers, mostly into former farmland.

The Fourteenth Five-Year Plan (covering the period 2021 to 2025) directs the development of more centralized cities and the avoidance of urban sprawl. The plan calls for acceleration of urban renewal to develop "human-centric cities." The plan's related Climate Change Special Plan emphasizes ecologically oriented urban planning, including through means like urban green rings, public transportation, and bicycle lanes and walking paths.

New towns in China typically have common design elements including wide avenues, large green spaces between tall buildings, shopping malls, and gated residential neighborhoods in a design approach with prioritizes scale and speed.

== Planning system ==
=== Legislation ===
The laws in regard to urban and rural planning in the People's Republic of China (mainland) include Urban and Rural Planning Law (中华人民共和国城乡规划法) and its relevant laws, acts and codes.

Hierarchies of legislation and examples concerning urban planning
Level	Examples	Notes
Constitution	-	
Laws	Urban and Rural Planning Law (城乡规划法); Land Administration Law (土地管理法)	
Administrative regulations	Regulation on the Protection of Famous Historical and Cultural Cities, Towns and Villages (历史文化名城名镇名村保护条例)	
Local regulations	Regulations of Beijing Municipality on City Planning (北京市城乡规划条例)	
Administrative rules	Measures for Formulating City Planning (城市规划编制办法)	Administrative rules enacted by departments under the State Council have the same legal authority to local government rules.
Local government rules	Technical Regulations of Shanghai Municipality on Urban Planning Administration (上海市城市规划管理技术规定)	
Technical standard/codes	Standard for basic terminology of urban planning (GB/T 50280–98); Standard for urban residential area planning and design (GB 50180-2018)	Among national standards, mandatory standards are prefixed "GB", and recommended standards are prefixed "GB/T".

=== Administrative system ===
At the national level, urban and rural planning in mainland China has been mainly administrated by the following departments since 1979:

- (1979 - 1982) State Administration of Urban Construction (国家城市建设总局)
- (1982 - 1988) Ministry of Urban-Rural Construction and Environmental Protection (城乡建设环境保护部)
- (1988 - 2008) Ministry of Construction (建设部)
- (2008 - 2018) Ministry of Housing and Urban-Rural Development (MOHURD, 住房和城乡建设部)
- (2018 - ) Ministry of Natural Resources (MNR, 自然资源部)

At the municipal level, the department concerned is often called "Natural Resources Bureau" (自然资源局) or "Planning and Natural Resources Bureau" (规划和自然资源局) varying with the city.

=== Types of plans ===
In mainland China, the statutory planning system defined in the Urban and Rural Planning Law is as follows:

==== Old system ====
Urban system planning

- National urban system planning (全国城镇体系规划)
- Provincial urban system planning (省域城镇体系规划)

City planning

- City master plan (城市总体规划)
  including different types of specialized plans
- Detailed plans
  - Regulatory plan (控制性详细规划)
    Known as "statutory plan" (simplified Chinese: 法定图则; traditional Chinese: 法定圖則) in Shenzhen; introduced from Hong Kong.
  - Site plan (修建性详细规划)

Town planning

- Town master plan (镇总体规划)
  In China, a towns is subordinate to a county or a district, and a county or a district is subordinate to a city or a municipality.
- Detailed plans
  - Regulatory plan (控制性详细规划)
  - Site plan (修建性详细规划)

Rural planning

- Township plan (乡规划)
- Village plan (村庄规划)

Plans which are formulated by urban planning departments but not defined in the Urban and Rural Planning Law, known as non-statutory planning, include strategic plans and renovation plans, etc..

==== New system ====
The planning system has been undergoing a reform since the establishment of the Ministry of Natural Resources (MNR) and the shift of urban planning administration from MOHURD to MNR. Since 2019, urban planning managed by the urban planning department, land-use planning managed by the land management administration, as well as other specialized planning of different levels of jurisdictions, have been gradually merged into an integrated "territorial spatial planning" (国土空间规划) system consisting of five levels and three types. The "five levels" are national, provincial, municipal, county, and township levels in correspondence with the administrative divisions of China. The "three types" include master planning, detailed planning, and specialized planning.

The planning system with "Five Levels & Three Types"
Level	Master planning	Detailed planning	Specialized planning
National	National territorial spatial planning	-	Specialized planning
Provincial	Provincial territorial spatial planning	-	Specialized planning
Municipal	Municipal territorial spatial planning	(Within UGB) Detailed planning (Beyond UGB) Village planning	Specialized planning
County	County territorial spatial planning	(Within UGB) Detailed planning (Beyond UGB) Village planning	Specialized planning
Town/Township	Town/township territorial spatial planning	(Within UGB) Detailed planning (Beyond UGB) Village planning	-

Master plans are the most important document in the urban planning system, and are statutory documents. The master planning tool entails conceptualizing a built environment from inception, rationalizing land use with a blueprint, designing a comprehensive mobility network, allocating recreational spaces and open areas, and regulating building practices. Development control plans are subordinate to master plans.

Major entities involved in the planning of new cities in China include China Academy of Urban Planning and Design (CAUPD) and Tongji University.

=== Development control ===
In practice, urban and rural planning in China is managed through the examination and approval of "one proposal & three permits" (一书三证), namely:

- Written proposal of location (建设项目选址意见书, required only for allotted land free of charge in urban areas)
- Land use permit (建设用地规划许可证, applied in urban areas)
- Building permit (建设工程规划许可证, applied in urban areas)
- Rural construction and planning permit (乡村建设规划许可证, applied in rural areas)

The concept of "ecological control line" is a regional development strategy first implemented in Hong Kong and then used elsewhere, such as Shenzhen, where 50% of the land is protected from development.

== Criticism and reform ==
It has been pointed out that the current policy of copying existing, "old", western cities or established Asian cities such as Singapore means missing out on opportunities for radical new thinking regarding city planning that are arising from the unprecedented speed of the current Chinese urbanization. For instance, it has been suggested that putting the entire road network underground can be a viable solution when dense cities are being built "from scratch".

An important theme in urban planning reform discourse is the idea of "integrating multiple plans into one" (duo gui he yi). This concept focuses on integrating multiple types of plans (such as urban-rural plans, ecological and environmental plans, and others) into a single plan structure at one administrative level (such as the city level or the county level). Integrating multiple plans into one aims to consolidate planning approaches into a single blueprint and thereby achieve more consistent long-term implementation. Reforms in this regard were first experimented with in the development of Pudong New Area.

== See also ==
- Administrative divisions of China
- Ancient Chinese urban planning
- Urban Planning Society of China (UPSC, 中国城市规划学会)
- Urban village (China)
- Urbanization in China
- Metropolitan regions of China
- Urban planning in communist countries
- Urban planning in Shanghai
  - Greater Shanghai Plan
