= China Academy of Urban Planning and Design =

Chinese research institute

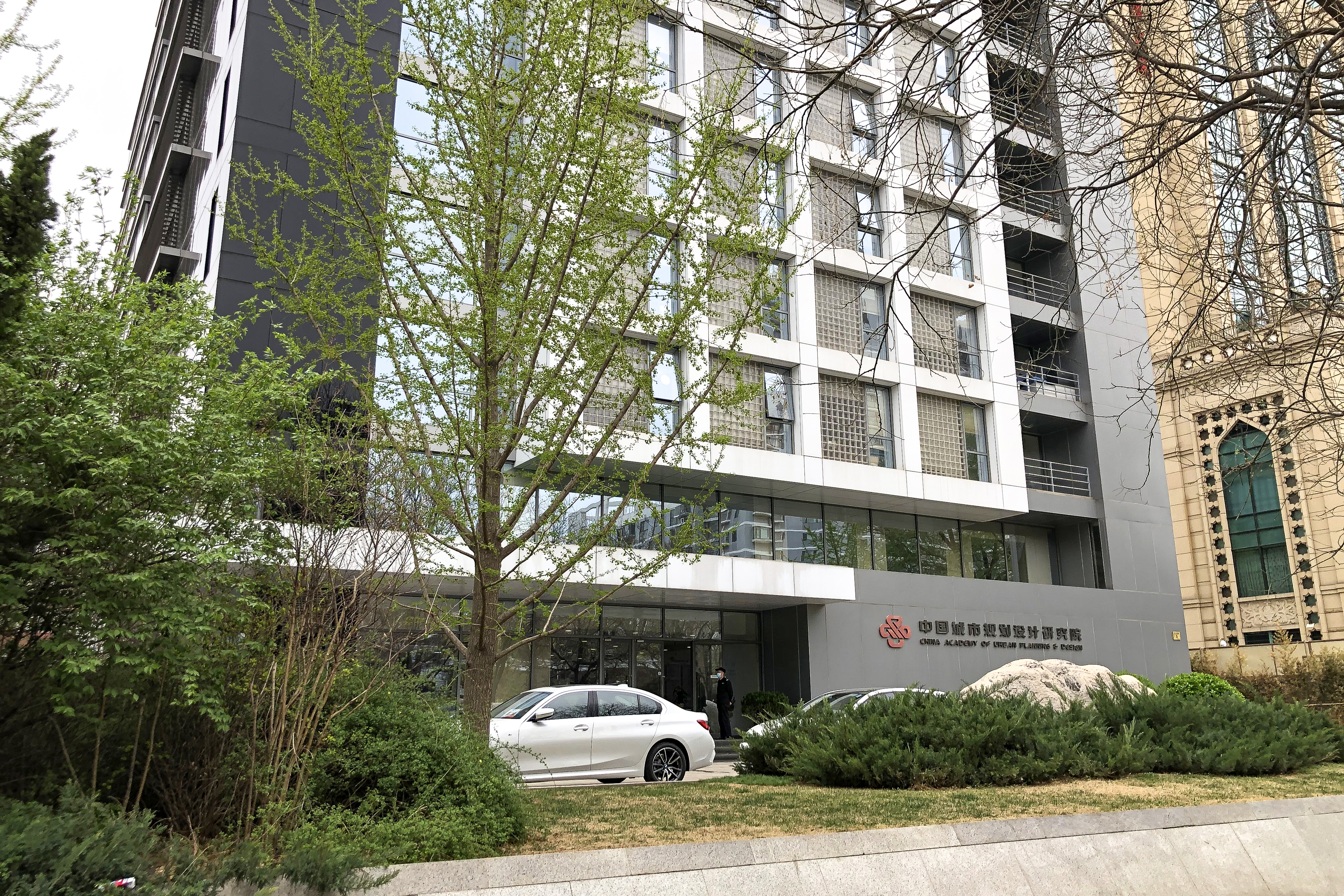
CAUPD east wing

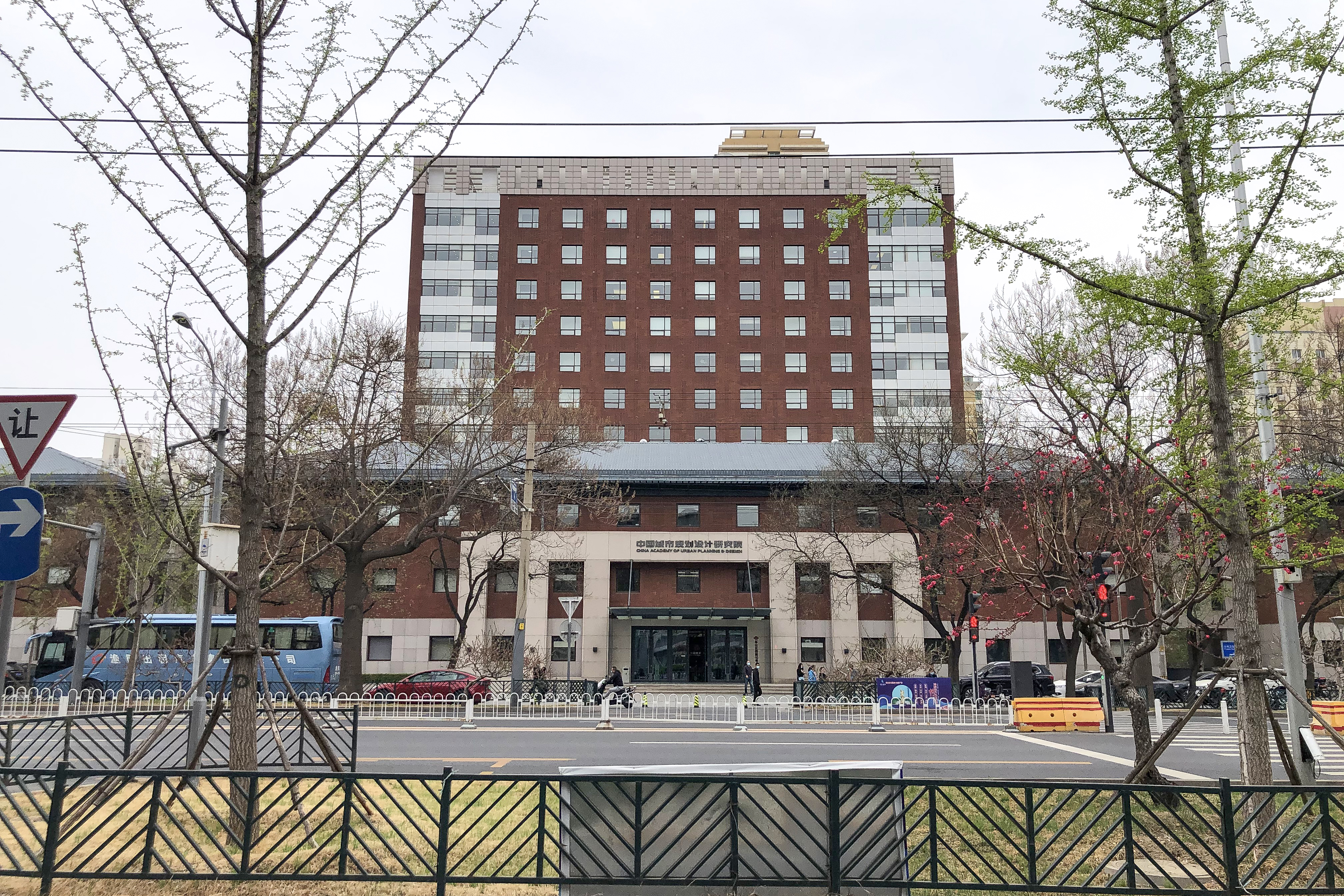
CAUPD west wing

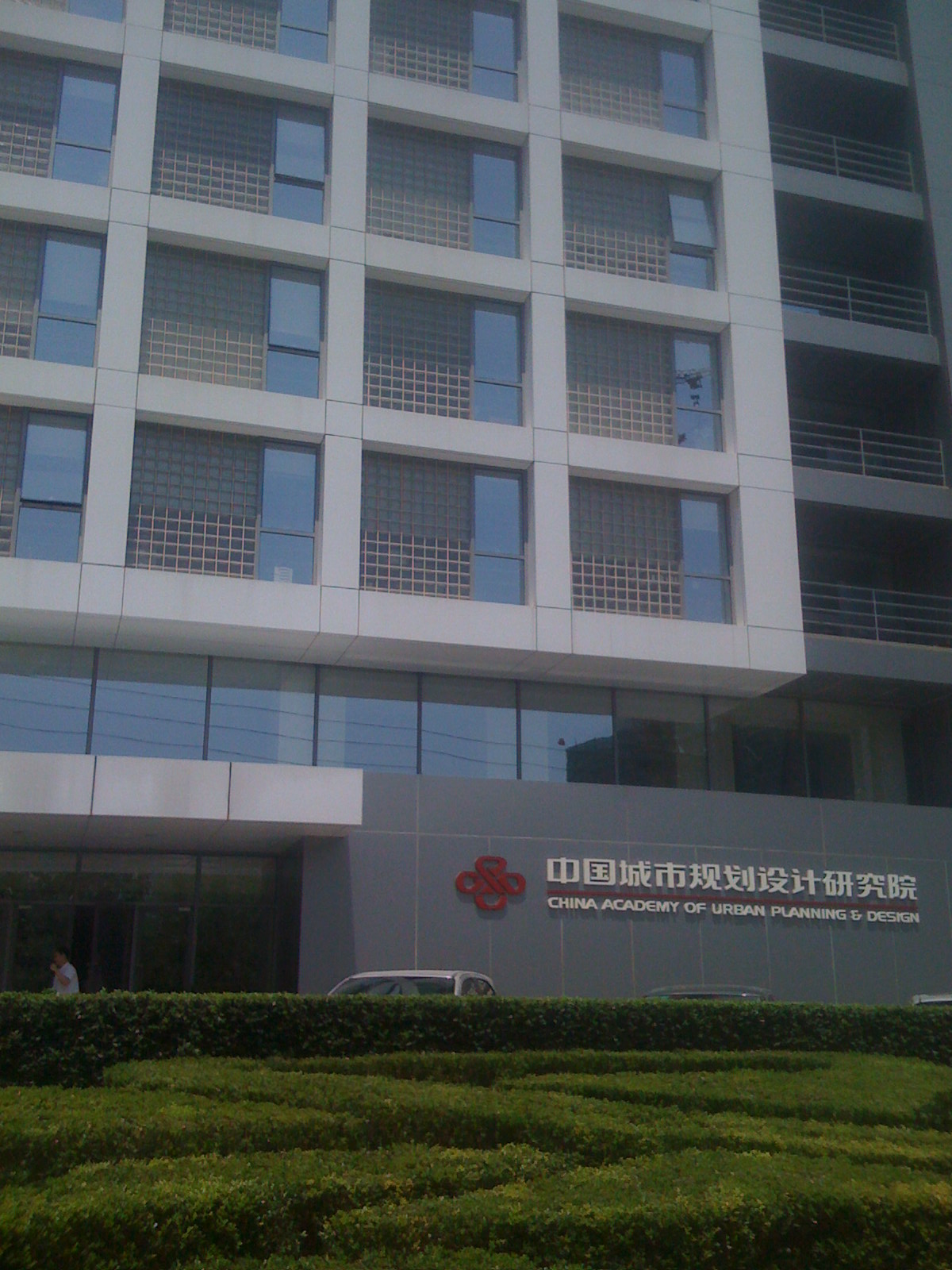
CAUPD office building in Beijing, China

The China Academy of Urban Planning and Design (Chinese: 中国城市规划设计研究院; pinyin: Zhōngguó Chéngshì Guīhuà Shèjì yán Jiùyuàn) is a research institution under the Ministry of Housing and Urban-Rural Development (MOHURD) and a national information center for planning studies. It is a service provider in the areas of urban planning, engineering design, engineering consulting, tourism planning, engineering surveying for heritage preservation, water-resource assessment for development projects, and architectural design and system integration for intelligent buildings. It is also qualified as a national service provider to undertake overseas projects in civil engineering surveying, consulting, design and inspection. In addition, the academy is entitled to organize overseas study tours and to run international training programs in the urban planning field.

== Role ==
CAUPD has four major roles:

1. to offer planning advice for government authorities;
2. to undertake planning studies and compose relevant norms;
3. to provide planning consulting services; and
4. to carry out works for social and public welfare.

CAUPD has a major role in designing and planning new cities in China.

== Relationships with other organizations ==
CAUPD is authorized by the Academic Degrees Committee of the State Council to confer Master's Degrees in Urban Planning and to operate a post-doctorate research station. It also is the backing and sponsoring body of over ten academic organizations such as the Urban Planning Society of China, the Urban Transport Planning Committee of China and the National Network of Scientific and Technological Information in Urban Planning. The organization routinely sends groups of its employees to the UCLA Luskin School of Public Affairs in Los Angeles, California to study and participate in social exchanges with master's degree students in Urban Planning. In a related exchange, masters students in Urban Planning from the UCLA Luskin School of Public Affairs, USC Price School of Public Policy, and Portland State University have been welcomed to participate in internships in various CAUPD offices. CAUPD has also established links with relevant academic institutions and companies from more than 20 countries in the world. It is the corporate member of the International Federation of Housing and Planning (IFHP).

CAUPD is the corporate member of the China International Engineering Consulting Corporation. It is also the national administrative and technical office on planning norms and rail transport codes. Three research centers of MHURD are located in CAUPD: the Urban Transport Center, the Urban Rail and LRT Research Center, the Urban Water Resources Center and Urban Water Quality Inspecting Center.

CAUPD advocates and promotes the ethos of “realistic in spirit, active in thinking and rigorous in style”. In its staff pool of over 550 people, there are two academicians of the Chinese Engineering Academy, one counselor of the State Council, 360 professional workers in which more than 200 people have senior professional titles (including 55 professors).

CAUPD has 3 studios and 12 institutes in Beijing, and 6 branch offices in Shanghai, Shenzhen, Chongqing, Haikou, Shantou, and Xiamen. Its Beijing office is located a No. 5 West Chegongzhuang Road, Haidian District, Beijing, China. Since 1982, the academy has completed over 3500 planning related projects, in which 50 projects have won national or ministry-level prizes and over 160 projects won provincial prizes.

== See also ==
- Urbanization in China
