= UPSC (disambiguation) =

UPSC may refer to:

- Union Public Service Commission of India
- Urban Planning Society of China
- Uttarakhand Public Service Commission of Uttarakhand, India
