= Hartland, Lexington =

Hartland
- Neighborhood of Lexington, Kentucky
- Interactive map of Hartland
- Coordinates: 37.956°N 84.476°W
- Country: United States
- State: Kentucky
- County: Fayette
- City: Lexington

Area
  - Total: .586 sq mi (1.52 km^{2})
  - Water: 0 sq mi (0.0 km^{2})

Population (2000)
  - Total: 703
  - Density: 1,199/sq mi (463/km^{2})
- Time zone: UTC-5 (Eastern (EST))
  - Summer (DST): UTC-4 (EDT)
- ZIP code: 40515
- Area code: 859

Hartland is a neighborhood in southeastern Lexington, Kentucky, United States. Its boundaries are Tates Creek Road to the west, Armstrong Mill Road to the east, the Lexington urban growth boundary to the south, and Kenesaw Drive to the north.

== Neighborhood statistics ==
- Area: 0.586 square miles (1.52 km^{2})
- Population: 703
- Population density: 1,199 people per square mile
- Median household income: $90,175 (2010)
