= National New-Type Urbanization Plan =

Chinese government urbanization plan

The National New-Type Urbanization Plan is a Chinese government plan to urbanize formerly rural residents in order to help transition China from an export-oriented economy to one with increasing amounts of domestic consumption. The National New-Type Urbanization Plan (2014-2020) was China's first national strategic urbanization plan. A new version for the period 2021-2035 has been prepared, but as of March 2023 was not yet publicized.

National New-Type Urbanization has resulted in more centralized urban planning processes. Investments in infrastructure for newly urbanized residents also had an impact in increasing China's industrialization and GDP.

== Overview ==
The National New-Type Urbanization Plan was announced in 2014. The National New-Type Urbanization Plan (2014-2020) was China's first national urbanization plan. As a strategic policy document, the plan mostly refrained from setting specific quantifiable targets. A new version of the plan covering the period 2021-2035 has been prepared, but as of March 2023, has not been released.

National New-Type Urbanization proposes to stimulate the economy and develop common prosperity. National New-Type Urbanization seeks to transition China's economic focus from production-for-export to increased domestic consumption. The Plan's emphasis on developing the domestic consumer economy is explicit. To do so, China seeks to relocate hundreds of millions of rural Chinese to cities which are being built on a massive scale to accommodate new urban citizens. The plan seeks to urbanize 250 million rural Chinese by 2026. The Plan thus reflects an underlying assumption that consumer purchases by urbanites are key to China's continued economic development.

The 2014 plan sought to attribute an urban hukou to 100 million people by 2020. It relaxed restrictions on small cities (fewer than 500,000 people) and medium cities (more than 1 million people). It maintained strong hukou restrictions on cities of more than 5 million inhabitants.

In addition to urbanizing formerly rural people, the National New-Type Urbanization Plan seeks to optimize urbanization patterns, improve urban sustainability, and promote urban-rural coordination. To increase urban-rural coordination, the state incorporates rural planning as part of municipal governments' planning processes. New-type urbanization prioritizes quality of growth over quantity of growth.

In the logic of the National New-Type Urbanization Plan, approaches to urbanization should advance the Chinese political concept of ecological civilization. The Plan requires 20% of municipal regions to be zoned as ecological protection areas.

The plan specified a maximum density of 100 m^{2} urban land per capita.

The National New-Type Urbanization Plan for 2014-2020 also addresses smart cities. It identifies six important aspects for developing smart cities: (1) information network and broadband, (2) digitization of planning management, (3) smart infrastructure, (4) convenience of public services, (5) modernizing industrial development, and (6) sophisticated social governance.

As of 2023, new-type urbanization is a central theme in China's urban planning. Xiong'an is being developed as an exemplar of the Chinese model of new-type urbanization.

== Impact ==
Prior to the National New-Type Urbanization Plan, development planning processes were more decentralized. The methods of planning it requires now coordinate planning processes that were previously separate and spread across separate bureaucracies dealing with urban and land planning, economic planning, environmental planning, and tourist planning.

The state investment in infrastructure for newly urbanized residents, as well as their concentration in urban areas, has increased China's industrialization and gross domestic product.

== See also ==
- Territorial spatial planning
- Urbanization in China
