= Wu Liangyong =

Chinese architect and urban planner (born 1922)

- 吴良镛
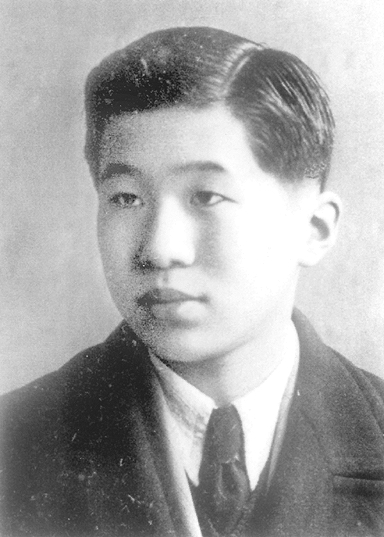
- Wu at the age of 24
- Born: 7 May 1922 (age 104); Jiangning County, Jiangsu, Republic of China
- Education: National Central University; Cranbrook Educational Community
- Awards: Ordre des Arts et des Lettres (1999); Prince Claus Award (2002); Highest Science and Technology Award (2012)
- Scientific career
- Fields: Architecture
- Workplaces: Tsinghua University
- Doctoral advisor: Eero Saarinen
- Other academic advisors: Liang Sicheng

Chinese name
- Simplified Chinese: 吴良镛
- Traditional Chinese: 吳良鏞
Transcriptions
Standard Mandarin
- Hanyu Pinyin: Wú Liángyōng

Wu Liangyong (Chinese: 吴良镛, born 7 May 1922) is a Chinese architect and urban planner. He was a former professor in urban planning, architecture, and design. In preparation to the 2008 Summer Olympics in Beijing, he was leading the team that studied the buildings of the games. He is considered the most influential architect and urban planner in China.

== Life ==
Wu was born in Nanjing on 7 May 1922. In 1944, he obtained a bachelor's degree in architecture at the National Central University (now Nanjing University) in Chongqing, and a master's degree at the American Guangxi Art Academy. He also studied at the Cranbrook Academy of Art in the United States. Together with professor Liang Sicheng, he founded the Faculty of Architecture on the Tsinghua University in 1946, where he focused on urban planning, architecture, and design. All together he taught fifty years at Tsinghua University.

Next to his professorate, Wu carried out different administrative functions. He was vice-president of the International Union of Architects and of the Architecture Society of China. Furthermore, he was chairman of the World Society for the Science of Human Settlements and of the Urban Planning Society of China.

His development of the Ju'er Hutong in Beijing is seen as state of the art. Furthermore, he developed the new library of Beijing and the enlargement of Tiananmen Square, and redeveloped Guilin and the Central Art and Design Academy of the Confucius Institute. In preparation to the 2008 Summer Olympics in Beijing, Wu was leading the team that studied the buildings of the games.

Wu received a number of awards. He was the first to win the Award for Scientific and Technological Progress by the State Education Commission. In 1993, he won a World Habitat Award of the United Nations for his contribution to the house-building project of Ju'er Hutong in Beijing. In 1995, he won the Ho Leung Ho Lee Prize and in 1996 the UIA Architectural Education Prize of the International Union of Architects. Wu was honored with a Prince Claus Award from the Netherlands in 2002. The jury praised his architectonic work, as well as his compilation of a ten-volume encyclopedia of regional architectures around the world.

Wu turned 100 in May 2022.

== Bibliography (selection) ==
- 1989: General Theory of Architecture
- 1991: The Second Report on the Rural and Urban Spatial Development Planning Study for the Capital Region, ISBN 978-7302139928
- 1999: Rehabilitating the Old City of Beijing: A Project in the Ju'Er Hutong Neighbourhood, ISBN 978-0774807265
- 2014: Integrated Architecture (English-Italian Translation of General Theory of Architecture), ISBN 9788868121433. Nuova Cultura,
