= Kaogongji =

Ancient Chinese work on technology and science

- Traditional Chinese: 《考工記》
- Simplified Chinese: 《考工记》
- Literal meaning: Record of a Review of [Various] Works
Transcriptions
Standard Mandarin
- Hanyu Pinyin: 《Kǎogōngjì》
- Wade–Giles: K'ao-kung-chi

The Kaogongji, Kaogong Ji, or Kao Gong Ji, variously translated as The Record of Trades, Records of Examination of Craftsman, Book of Diverse Crafts, and The Artificers' Record, is an ancient Chinese work on science and technology in China. It was compiled sometime during the 5th century BCE or 300 BCE and then included as a section of the Rites of Zhou under the Han as a replacement for the lost text concerning the Offices of Winter concerning public works.

== Contents ==
Pages from a printed edition of the Kaogongji from the Shanghai Library

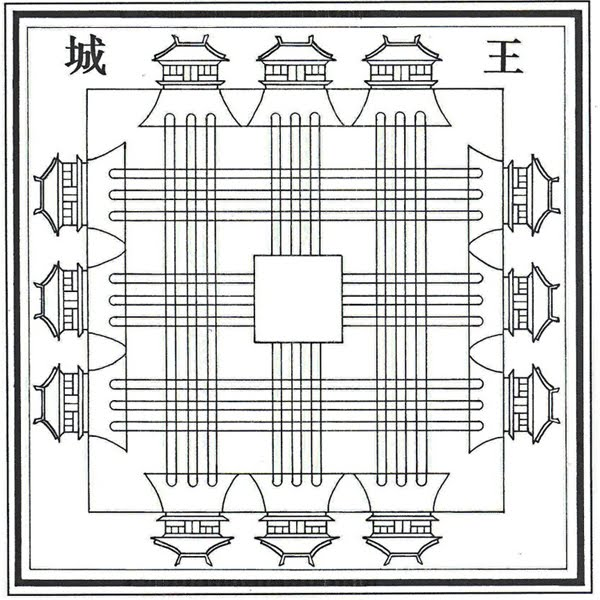
The diagram of Chengzhou's idealized layout from the 1175 Song-era Xinding Sanlitu, based on the Kaogongji descriptions of an ideal capital

The Kaogongji is the oldest known technical encyclopedia, particularly noted for its early discussion of Chinese urban planning. It has been suggested that the Kaogongji "may have been written by an administrator to assure the emperor that everything was under control. It is part of a manual for how to run the empire". The book includes "enigmatic" recipes for metal-making; in 2022, researchers reanalyzed its mention jin and xi, key components for making bronze thought for centuries to have been copper and tin, as possibly referring instead to premade alloys of uncertain composition. Such a composition would yield bronzes more like early Chinese bronzes, revealing unexpected complexity in early Chinese metal production.

== Scholarship ==
Lin Xiyi (林希逸, Lín Xīyì) published his Kaogongji Jie, a study of the Kaogongji, c. 1235. Dai Zhen's own Kaogongji Tu was published in 1746 and Cheng Yaotian (程瑤田, 程瑶田, Chéng Yáotián)'s Kaogongji Chuangwu Xiaoji c. 1805.

== English translations ==
- Jun Wenren (13 October 2017). Ancient Chinese Encyclopedia of Technology: Translation and Annotation of the 'Kaogong Ji' (The Artificers Record). Routledge. ISBN 978-0-8153-6738-3. OCLC 1063733507.
- Guan Zhengjian; et al. (2020). Kao Gong Ji: The World's Oldest Encyclopaedia of Technologies. Leiden, Boston: BRILL. ISBN 90-04-41694-3. OCLC 1139014244.
