= Territorial spatial planning =

Territorial spatial planning (Chinese: 国土空间规划; pinyin: Guótǔ kōngjiān guīhuà) is the spatial planning system of the People's Republic of China which, according to its official definition, serves as the guide of the country's territory's development, the blueprint of sustainable development, as well as the fundamental basis of all kinds of development. Territorial spatial planning is an "all-in-one" planning encompassing former major function zone planning, land-use planning, urban and rural planning, as well as other different types of spatial planning.

== Background ==
Prior to the establishment of the Ministry of Natural Resources and the introduction of policies of territorial spatial planning, various types of spatial planning systems had existed in mainland China, which include (but are not limited to):

Planning system	Competent authority at the national level	Period	Legal/policy basis
National economic and social development plan (国民经济和社会发展规划)	National Development and Reform Commission	5 years	N/A
Major function zone planning (主体功能区规划)	National Development and Reform Commission	10 – 15 years	Opinions on Accelerating the Construction of Ecological Civilization
Land-use planning (土地利用规划)	Competent department of land management department (Ministry of Land and Resources)	15 years	Land Management Law
Urban and rural planning (城乡规划)	Competent department of urban and rural planning department (Ministry of Housing and Urban-Rural Development)	15 – 20 years	Urban and Rural Planning Law
Environmental protection planning (环境保护规划)	Competent department of environmental protection (Ministry of Environmental Protection)	5 years	Environmental Protection Law

In addition to the variety and complexity, due to the overlaps and gaps among the functions of different plans and departments concerned and the failure to coordinate them, contradictions among different plans had frustrated the formulation and implementation of these plans. Despite the provisions in both the Urban and Rural Planning Law and the Land Management Law requiring their corresponding plans to be coordinated with others, the mechanism of coordination remained unclear and, in practice, unimplemented.

An attempt to solve this problem was conceptualized in the Decision of the CCCPC on Some Major Issues Concerning Comprehensively Deepening the Reform passed on November 12, 2013:

51. Improving the system of natural resource property rights and the system of natural resource utilization control. Ecological spaces including rivers, forests, mountain ranges, grasslands, undeveloped land, tidal flats, etc. shall be uniformly registered their ownership, so as to establish a property rights system for natural resource assets with clear property rights, rights and responsibilities clearly defined and effective supervision. A spatial planning system shall be establish, and development control lines for production, living and ecological space shall be designated so as to implement use control. The system for the economical and intensive use of energy, water and land shall be improved.
The national natural resource management system shall be improved, so as to exercise the unified duties as the owners of natural resource assets owned by the whole people. The natural resource supervision system shall be improved so as to exercise the unified all duties in regard to territorial space utilization control.

— The CCCPC on Some Major Issues Concerning Comprehensively Deepening the Reform (中共中央关于全面深化改革若干重大问题的决定)

On December 12–13, the Central Working Conference of Urbanization (中央城镇化工作会议) discussed the necessity to "build a spatial planning system, push forward the reform of the planning system, and accelerate legislative works of planning".

The National New-type Urbanization Plan (2014-2020) (国家新型城镇化规划（2014－2020年）) put forward the idea to "strengthen coordination between urban planning and other planning systems including economic and social development planning, major function zone planning, land-use planning, ecological and environmental protection planning, and infrastructure planning. Push forward the integration of multiple plans, including economic and social development planning, urban planning, and land use planning, into one plan in areas where conditions permit." In the same year, the National Development and Reform Commission, the Ministry of Land and Resources, the Ministry of Environmental Protection, and the Ministry of Housing and Urban-Rural Development jointly issued the Notice on the Pilot Project of "Integrating Multiple Plans Into One" for Cities and Counties (关于开展市县“多规合一”试点工作的通知), and a total of 28 cities and counties were appointed in the pilot project.

On September 21, 2015, the Central Committee of the Chinese Communist Party and the State Council issued the Integrated Reform Plan for Promoting Ecological Progress, which declared that "A spatial planning system will be designed, with the main purpose of strengthening the spatial governance and improving its structure, which is nationally unified and better connected between different departments of government, and according to which management is divided between governments at multiple levels, in an effort to eliminate overlapping and conflicting spatial plans, the overlap and duplication of responsibilities between departments, and the issue of local authorities frequently changing their plans." "Spatial plans will be divided into national, provincial, and municipal (or county) levels (spatial plans for cities which are divided into districts will be formulated for the district level)."

On March 17, 2018, the First Session of the 13th National People's Congress adopted the Decision of the First Session of the 13th National People's Congress on the Plan for Institutional Reform of the State Council, and the Plan for Institutional Reform of the State Council was approved. The plan states: "The Ministry of Natural Resources will be established. The Ministry of Land and Resources's duties, the National Development and Reform Commission's duties to organize the formulation of major function zone plans, the Ministry of Housing and Urban-Rural Development's duties in regard to urban-rural planning management, the Ministry of Water Resources's duties in regard to water resources survey and ownership registration management, the Ministry of Agriculture's duties in regard to grassland resources survey and ownership registration management, the State Forestry Bureau's duties in regard to forest and wetland resources survey and ownership registration management, the State Oceanic Administration's duties, and the State Bureau of Surveying and Mapping's duties shall be integrated, and the Ministry of Natural Resources shall be established as a department under the State Council. The Ministry of Natural Resources shall retain the brand of the State Oceanic Administration. The Ministry of Land and Resources, the State Oceanic Administration and the National Administration of Surveying, State Bureau of Surveying and Mapping will be dismantled." On April 10, 2018, the Ministry of Natural Resources was officially inaugurated, which cleared the administrative barriers to the integration of different types of spatial planning.

On May 9, 2019, the Central Committee of the Chinese Communist Party and the State Council issued the Opinions on Establishing and Supervising the Implementation of Territorial Spatial Planning System (关于建立国土空间规划体系并监督实施的若干意见), which set out objectives of the reform of territorial spatial planning. On May 28 of the same year, the Ministry of Natural Resources issued the Notice by the Ministry of Natural Resources on the Comprehensive Development of Territorial Spatial Planning (自然资源部关于全面开展国土空间规划工作的通知), which prescribed "Major function zone plans, general plans for land use, urban system plans, comprehensive plans for cities (towns), and marine function zoning, etc. shall no longer be newly formulated or submitted for approval. Provincial land-use plans, urban system plans, major function zone plans, comprehensive plans for cities (towns), and the former pilot provincial spatial plans and pilot cities and counties' "multiple plans to one" projects which have been approved and expire later than 2020 shall be integrated into newly formulated territorial spatial plans at the same level in accordance with new planning requirements."

On August 26, the Land Management Law of the People's Republic of China was amended and adopted. Article 18 was added to prescribe the legal status of territorial spatial planning:

Article 18 The State establishes the system of territorial spatial planning. The formulation of territorial spatial plans should adhere to the principles of ecology first, green and sustainable development, and functional areas including ecological, agricultural, and urban areas should be arranged scientifically and orderly, so as to optimize the spatial structure and layout of the territory and improve the quality and efficiency of territorial spatial development and protection.
Territorial spatial plans approved in accordance with law are the fundamental basis for all kinds of development, protection and construction activities. Comprehensive plans for land use and urban and rural plans shall no longer be formulated for those that have already formulated territorial spatial plans.
第十八条 国家建立国土空间规划体系。编制国土空间规划应当坚持生态优先，绿色、可持续发展，科学有序统筹安排生态、农业、城镇等功能空间，优化国土空间结构和布局，提升国土空间开发、保护的质量和效率。
经依法批准的国土空间规划是各类开发、保护、建设活动的基本依据。已经编制国土空间规划的，不再编制土地利用总体规划和城乡规划。

== Main points ==
=== "Five levels, three types, four systems" ===
On May 27, 2019, the State Council Information Office held a press conference on the Guidelines of the CPC Central Committee and the State Council on Establishing and Supervising the Implementation of a Territorial Spatial Planning System (中共中央 国务院关于建立国土空间规划体系并监督实施的若干意见). Zhuang Shaoqin (庄少勤), chief planner of the Ministry of Natural Resources, said in response to a journalist's question that the levels and contents of territorial spatial planning can be summarized into "five levels, three types, four systems" (五级三类四体系). They are:

- The "five levels" (五级) are the five levels of the administrative divisions of China: national, provincial, municipal, county, and township levels. Among them, national plans are more strategic, provincial plans focus on coordination, and plans on municipal, county and township levels on implementation.
- The "three types" (三类) are general planning, detailed planning, and special planning.
  - Comprehensive plans emphasize the comprehensiveness of planning. They are overall arrangements for the protection, development, utilization and restoration of territorial spaces in a certain region, e.g. a whole administrative region.
  - Detailed plans emphasize implementation. They are generally formulated on municipal, county levels or below and specify land plots' functions and development intensities, etc.. Detailed plans are the legal basis for the development and protection of territorial spaces, including the implementation of territorial land use regulation, the issuance of planning permission for urban and rural construction projects, and the implementation of different kinds of construction. Plans of villages outside urban development boundaries (UDB) are treated as detailed plans.
  - Relevant special plans emphasize specialization. They are generally organized and formulated by natural resources departments or related departments, and can be formulated at the national, provincial, and municipal levels; In particular, special arrangements are made for specific regions' or river basins' spatial development, protection, and utilization to embody their specific functions.
- The "four systems" (四体系) include planning's formulation and approval system, planning's implementation and supervision system which involve the procedures of planning; planning's law and policy system, and planning's technical standard system which support the operation of planning.

"Five levels" and "three types"
Level	Comprehensive planning	Detailed planning		Specialized planning
National	National territorial spatial planning	-		Specialized planning
Provincial	Provincial territorial spatial planning	-		Specialized planning
Municipal	City territorial spatial planning	(Inside UDB) Detailed planning	(Outside UDB); Village planning	Specialized planning
County	County territorial spatial planning	(Inside UDB) Detailed planning	(Outside UDB); Village planning	Specialized planning
Town	Town/township territorial spatial planning	(Inside UDB) Detailed planning	(Outside UDB); Village planning	-

=== "Two evaluations" ===
The "two evaluations" (双评价) of territorial spatial planning, i.e. the evaluation of the carrying capacity of resources and environment and the evaluation of the suitability of territorial spatial development, are the basis for the formulation of territorial spatial planning. According to the Technical Guide for Evaluations of Resource and Environmental Carrying Capacity and Suitability of Territorial Spatial Development (Consultation Draft) (资源环境承载能力和国土空间开发适宜性评价技术指南（征求意见稿）) formulated by the Ministry of Natural Resources, "resource and environmental carrying capacity" refers to "the comprehensive support level of natural resources, environmental capacity and ecological service function for human activities in a given territorial space", while the "suitability of territorial spatial development" refers to "the suitability of land space for different patterns of development, protection, and utilization, such as ecological protection, agricultural production, and urban construction."

=== "Three zones, three lines" ===
Among "three zones, three lines" (三区三线), "three zones" refer to the areas of ecological, agricultural, and urban functions. "Three lines", i.e. three control lines, are the ecological conservation red line (生态保护红线), permanent prime farmland (永久基本农田), and the urban development boundary (城镇开发边界). The"three zones" highlight the division of dominant functions, while the "three lines" emphasize the strict control over boundaries.

The three control lines are defined as follows:

- Ecological conservation red line: Areas with special and important ecological functions within eco-spaces and must be strictly protected.
- Permanent prime farmland: Cultivated land under permanent special protection to ensure national food security and the supply of important agricultural produce. They shall be designated on the basis of the current distribution of farmland, the quality of farmland, the cultivation of grain crops, and the situation of soil pollution; On the basis of strictly observing the farmland red line, a certain proportion of cultivated land that meets the quality requirements shall be designated according to law. In the designated permanent prime farmland, problems such as falsified designation, illegal occupancy and serious pollution should be comprehensively rectified to ensure that the area of permanent prime farmland is not reduced, the quality is improved and the distribution is stable。
- Urban development boundary: The boundary of areas in which intensive urban development and construction are allowed in order to meet the needs of urban development in a certain period of time, and in which urban functions is dominant. They include cities, administrative towns and various kinds of development zones.

The relationship between the "three zones" and "three lines" is listed as follow:

"Three zones"	Spaces delimited by "three lines" and other spaces	
Ecological space (生态空间)	Ecological conservation red line	Core areas of natural reserves
Ecological space (生态空间)	Ecological conservation red line	Normal areas of natural reserves
Ecological space (生态空间)	Ecological conservation red line	Other areas inside the red line
Ecological space (生态空间)	Other eco-spaces	
Agricultural space (农业空间)	Permanent prime farmland	
Agricultural space (农业空间)	Other agricultural spaces	
Urban space (城镇空间)	Urban development boundary	
Urban space (城镇空间)	Other urban spaces	

"Three zones" and "three lines" should be designated based on the result of "two evaluations".

=== Criteria for review ===
According to the Notice by the Ministry of Natural Resources on the Comprehensive Development of Territorial Spatial Planning, the main criteria for the review of the provincial territorial and spatial plans include:

1. Objectives for the development and protection of territorial spaces;
2. Development intensities of territorial spaces, the scale of land for construction, the area covered by the ecological conservation red line, natural shoreline rate, cultivated land quantity and the protected area of permanent prime farmland, total water consumption, etc. and the distribution of the quotas to lower levels;
3. The division of major function zones; the coordination and implementation of urban development boundaries, ecological protection red line, and permanent prime farmland;
4. The spatial arrangement of urban systems; city clusters, metropolitan area and other spatial structures in key regions of regional coordination;
5. The protection pattern of ecological buffer zones, ecological corridors and ecosystems; layouts of major infrastructure networks; requirements for supplies of urban and rural public service facilities;
6. A system of natural reserves, and a system of historical and cultural protection that reflects local characteristics;
7. Rural spatial structures and principles and requirements for promoting rural revitalization;
8. Policies and measures to ensure the implementation of the plan;
9. The guidance and obligatory requirements for plans at city and county levels, etc.

The criteria for municipal comprehensive territorial space plans which should be review by the State Council, in addition to a deeper and refined version of the provincial ones, also include:

1. Municipal territorial space zoning regulations;
2. Layouts of facilities including major transportation hubs, important linear utility networks, urban security and comprehensive disaster prevention system, underground spaces, and NIMBY facilities, as well as the principles and standards of the distribution of urban and rural public service facilities including policy-oriented urban housing, education, healthcare, elderly care, cultural and sports facilities;
3. (Within the urban development boundary) The control area and the requirements of an even distribution of structural urban green spaces, water bodies and other open spaces; The protection scope and requirements of all kinds of historical and cultural relics, the pattern and control requirements of ventilation corridors; Zoning of urban development intensities, control indexes including floor area ratios and densities, and spatial and morphological control requirements including heights and styles;
4. Urban function layout and land use structure of the city center.

== See also ==
- Urban planning in China
- Spatial planning
