= Urban growth boundary =

Regional boundary to control urban sprawl

An urban growth boundary (UGB) is a regional boundary, set in an attempt to control urban sprawl by, in its simplest form, mandating that the area inside the boundary be used for urban development and the area outside be preserved in its natural state or used for agriculture. Legislating for an urban growth boundary is one way, among many others, of managing the major challenges posed by unplanned urban growth and the encroachment of cities upon agricultural and rural land.

An urban growth boundary circumscribes an entire urbanized area and is used by local governments as a guide to zoning and land use decisions, and by utilities and other infrastructure providers to improve efficiency through effective long term planning (e.g. optimising sewerage catchments, school districts, etc.).

If the area affected by the boundary includes multiple jurisdictions a special urban planning agency may be created by the state or regional government to manage the boundary. In a rural context, the terms town boundary, village curtilage or village envelope may be used to apply the same constraining principles. Some jurisdictions refer to the area within an urban growth boundary as an urban growth area (UGA) or urban service area, etc. While the names are different, the concept is the same.

== History ==
The Metropolitan Green Belt first proposed by the London County Council in 1935.

Opposition to unregulated urban growth and ribbon development began to grow towards the end of the 19th century in England. The campaign group Campaign to Protect Rural England (CPRE) was formed in 1926 and exerted environmentalist pressure. Implementation of the notion dated from Herbert Morrison's 1934 leadership of the London County Council. It was first formally proposed by the Greater London Regional Planning Committee in 1935, "to provide a reserve supply of public open spaces and of recreational areas and to establish a green belt or girdle of open space".

New provisions for compensation in the 1947 Town and Country Planning Act allowed local authorities around the country to incorporate green belt proposals in their first development plans. The codification of Green Belt policy and its extension to areas other than London came with the historic Circular 42/55 inviting local planning authorities to consider the establishment of Green Belts.

In the United States, the first urban growth boundary was established in 1958, around the city of Lexington, Kentucky. Lexington's population was expanding, and city leaders were concerned about the survival of the surrounding horse farms closely tied to the city's cultural identity. The first statewide urban growth boundary policy was implemented in Oregon, under then governor Tom McCall, as part of the state's land-use planning program in the early 1970s. Tom McCall and his allies convinced the Oregon Legislature in 1973 to adopt the nation's first set of statewide land use planning laws. McCall, with the help of a unique coalition of farmers and environmentalists, persuaded the Legislature that the state's natural beauty and easy access to nature would be lost in a rising tide of urban sprawl. The new goals and guidelines required every city and county in Oregon to have a long-range plan addressing future growth that meets both local and statewide goals. The state of Tennessee passed the Tennessee Growth Policy Act (TGPA) in 1998 as a response to the state's growing population, increased land development, and conflicts regarding municipal annexation. Tennessee in the year prior to the TGPA's passing was ranked 4th in the United States for fastest rates of land development.

== Places with urban growth boundaries ==
=== Albania ===
Albania maintains the 'yellow line' system hailing from its socialist regime — limiting urban development beyond a designated boundary for all municipalities.

=== Australia ===
After the release of Melbourne 2030 in October 2002, the state government of Victoria legislated an urban growth boundary to limit urban sprawl. Since then, the urban growth boundary has been significantly increased a number of times.

=== Canada ===
In Canada, Vancouver, Toronto, Ottawa (the "Greenbelt"), London, and Waterloo, Ontario have boundaries to restrict growth and preserve greenspace. In Montreal and in the rest of Quebec, an agricultural protection law serves a similar purpose by restricting urban development to white zones and forbidding it on green zones.

Such boundaries are notably absent from cities such as Calgary, Edmonton, and Winnipeg that lie on flat plains and have expanded outwardly on former agricultural land. In British Columbia, the Agricultural Land Reserve serves a similar purpose adjacent to urban areas.

=== China ===
In 2017, Chinese Communist Party general secretary Xi Jinping delivered a speech in the 19th National Congress, in which he mentioned the delineation of "boundaries for urban development" (城镇开发边界). On November 11, 2019, the Party General Office and the General Office of the State Council issued a guiding opinion, requiring "three control lines", including boundaries of urban development, to be designated in territorial spatial planning.

==== Hong Kong ====
In the plan of some new towns, green belts are included and growth cannot sprawl into or across the green belts. In addition a majority of new towns are surrounded by country parks.

=== France ===
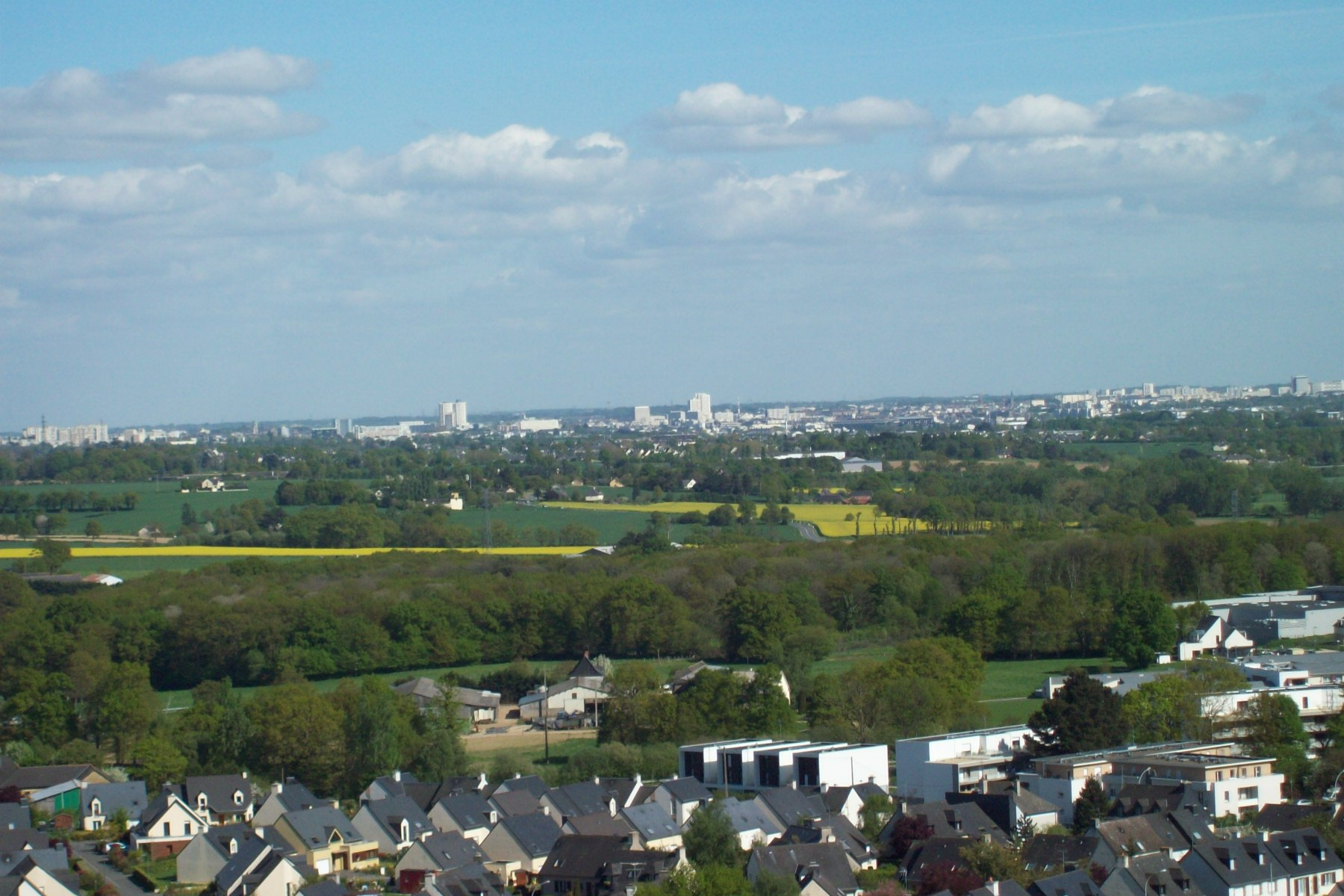
Green Belt between Rennes and L'Hermitage

In France, Rennes decided in the 1960s to maintain a green belt after its ring road. This green belt is named Ceinture verte.

=== New Zealand ===
Over the past two decades, Greater Auckland has been subject to a process of growth management facilitated through various strategic and legislative documents. An overarching objective has been to manage the growth of Auckland in a higherdensity, centres-based manner consistent with the Auckland Regional Growth Strategy. Effect is given to that strategy through a series of layers of control including the Local Government Amendment (Auckland) Act, the Regional Policy Statement and then via District Plans. A key outcome of the process was the establishment of a metropolitan urban limit (MUL) or urban fence, which dictated the nature and extent of urban activities that could occur within the MUL and hence also dictated the relative values of land within the MUL.

=== Romania ===
Containment of built-up development is defined through a General Zoning Plan in the case of both urban and rural municipalities. The plan defines the 'intravilan' as the boundary within which built-up development is allowed. Oradea municipality provides tools to verify if land parcels are located in intravilan or not.

=== South Africa ===
An integrated development plan is required in terms of Chapter 5 of the national Municipal Systems Act No 32 of 2000 for all local authorities in South Africa. This plan would include a spatial development framework plan as one of its components, which would require larger metropolitan areas to indicate an urban edge beyond which urban-type development would be largely restricted or forbidden. The concept was introduced in the 1970s by the Natal Town and Regional Planning Commission of the Province of Natal (now known as KwaZulu-Natal) in the regional guide plans for Durban and Pietermaritzburg. The concept was at that stage termed an "urban fence".

=== United Kingdom ===
Controls to constrain the area of urban development existed in London as early as the 16th century. In the middle of the 20th century the countryside abutting the London conurbation was protected by the Metropolitan Green Belt. Further green belts were then created around other urban areas in the United Kingdom.

=== United States ===
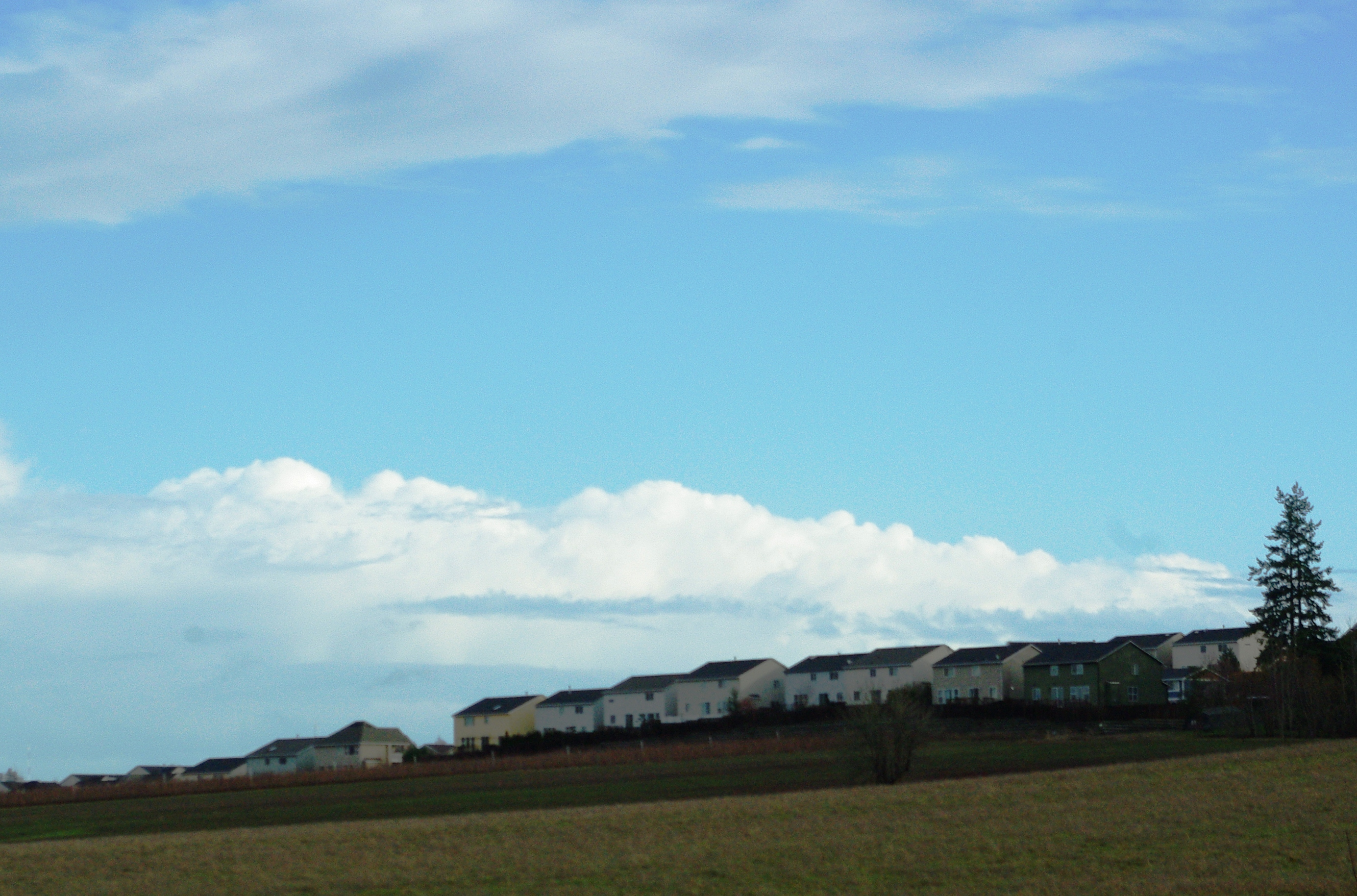
Dividing line between rural and urban in the Portland, Oregon, area

The U.S. states of Oregon, Washington and Tennessee require cities and counties to establish urban/county growth boundaries.

Oregon restricts the development of farm and forest land. Oregon's law provides that the growth boundary be adjusted regularly to ensure adequate supply of developable land; as of 2018 the boundary had been expanded more than thirty times since it was created in 1980. In the Metro area, the urban growth boundary has to have enough land within it for 20 years of growth; it is reviewed every six years. Other cities in Oregon seek regulatory review of proposed urban growth boundary expansions as needed. Some economic analysis has concluded that farmland lying immediately outside of Portland's growth boundary is worth as little as one-tenth as much as similar land located immediately on the other side; other analysis have found that the UGB has no effect on prices when some other variables are taken into account.

Washington's Growth Management Act, modeled on Oregon's earlier law and approved in 1990, affected mostly the state's more urban counties: as of 2018, Clark County, King County, Kitsap County, Pierce County, Snohomish County, and Thurston County.

In Tennessee, the boundaries are not used to control growth per se, but rather to define long-term city boundaries. (This was a response to a short-lived law in the late 1990s allowing almost any group of people in the state to form their own city). Every county in the state (except those with consolidated city-county governments) has to set a "planned growth area" for each of its municipalities, which defines how far out services such as water and sewer will go. In the Memphis area, annexation reserves have been created for all municipalities in the county. These are areas that have been set aside for a particular municipality to annex in the future. Cities cannot annex land outside of these reserves, so in effect the urban growth boundaries are along the borders of these annexation reserves. Additionally, new cities are only allowed to incorporate in areas determined to be planned for urban growth.

California requires each county to have a Local Agency Formation Commission, which sets urban growth boundaries for each city and town in the county.

States such as Texas use the delineation of extraterritorial jurisdictional boundaries to map out future city growth with the idea of minimizing competitive annexations rather than controlling growth.

Notable U.S. cities surrounded by UGBs include Portland, Oregon; Boulder, Colorado; Honolulu, Hawaii; Virginia Beach, Virginia; Lexington, Kentucky; Seattle, Washington; Knoxville, Tennessee; and San Jose, California. Urban growth boundaries also exist in Miami-Dade County, Florida and the Minneapolis–Saint Paul metropolitan area of Minnesota. In Miami-Dade, it is referred to as the Urban Development Boundary (UDB), and is generally to protect from continued sprawl into and drainage of the Everglades. Portland, Oregon is required to have an urban growth boundary which contains at least 20,000 acres (81 km^{2}) of vacant land.

Urban growth boundaries have come under an increasing amount of scrutiny in the past 10 years as housing prices have substantially risen, especially on the West Coast of the U.S. By limiting the supply of developable land, critics argue, UGBs increase the price of existing developable and already-developed land. As a result, they theorize, housing on that land becomes more expensive. In Portland, Oregon, for example, the housing boom of the previous four years drove the growth-management authority to substantially increase the UGB in 2004. While some point to affordability for this action, in reality it was in response to Oregon State law. By law, Metro, the regional government, is required to maintain a 20-year supply of land within the boundary. Even with the addition of several thousand acres (several km^{2}) housing prices continued to rise at record-matching paces. Supporters of UGBs point out that Portland's housing market is still more affordable than other West Coast cities, and housing prices have increased across the country.

== See also ==
- Community separator
- Land use planning
- Prime farmland
- Urban open space
- Urban rural fringe
