= Urbanization in China =

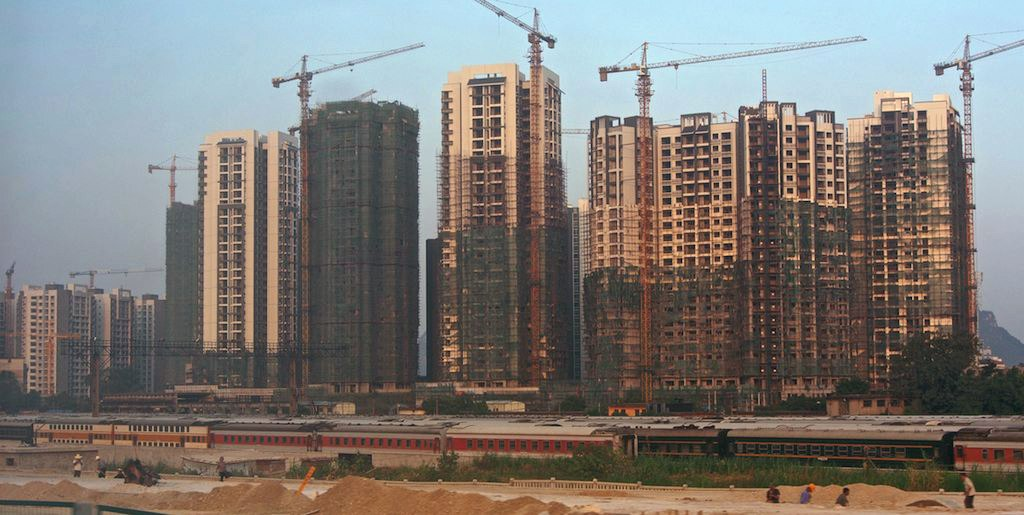
Urban construction work in a Chinese city, 2013

Urbanization in the People's Republic of China increased in speed following the initiation of the reform and opening up policy. According to the Chinese government, the country's urbanization rate was 67 percent at end of 2024. According to the United Nations, the country's urbanization rate was 83.7 percent in 2025, having peaked in absolute numbers in 2021.

== History ==
=== Before industrialization ===
China's rapid urbanization can be largely attributed to increases in food supply beginning 20th century. Starting at the end of the Qing period, China began importing moderate quantities of foodstuffs from the outside world to help feed its population. Along with improvements in agricultural productivity, labor demand in the countryside dropped dramatically.

By the same token, urbanization rarely exceeded ten percent of the total population although large urban centres were established. For example, during the Song, the northern capital Kaifeng (of the Northern Song) and southern capital Hangzhou (of the Southern Song) had 1.4 million and one million inhabitants, respectively. In addition, it was common that urban residents also had one foot in the rural sector due to private landholding property rights.

=== People's Republic of China ===
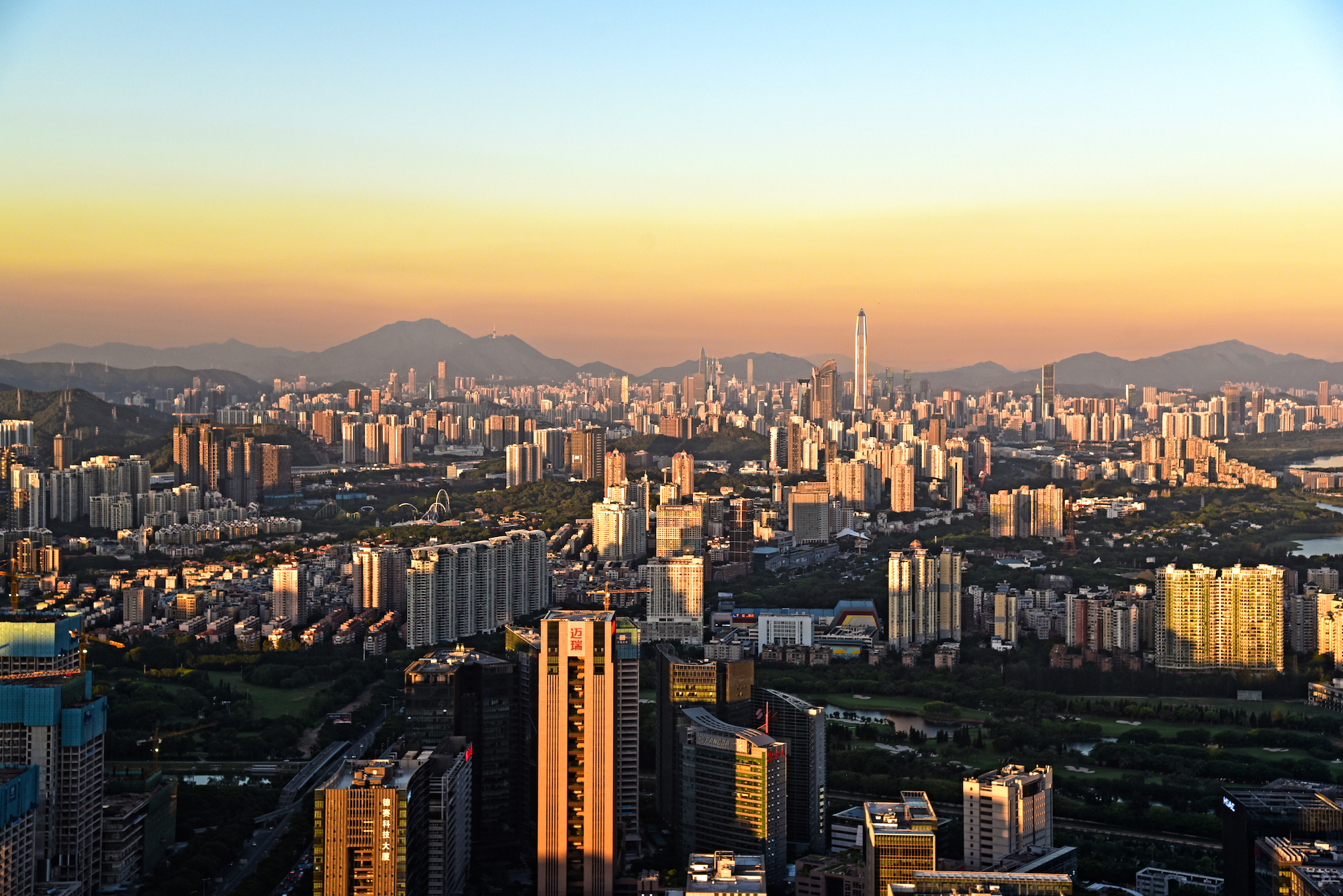
Originally a collection of fishing and agricultural villages, Shenzhen rapidly grew to be one of the largest cities in China.

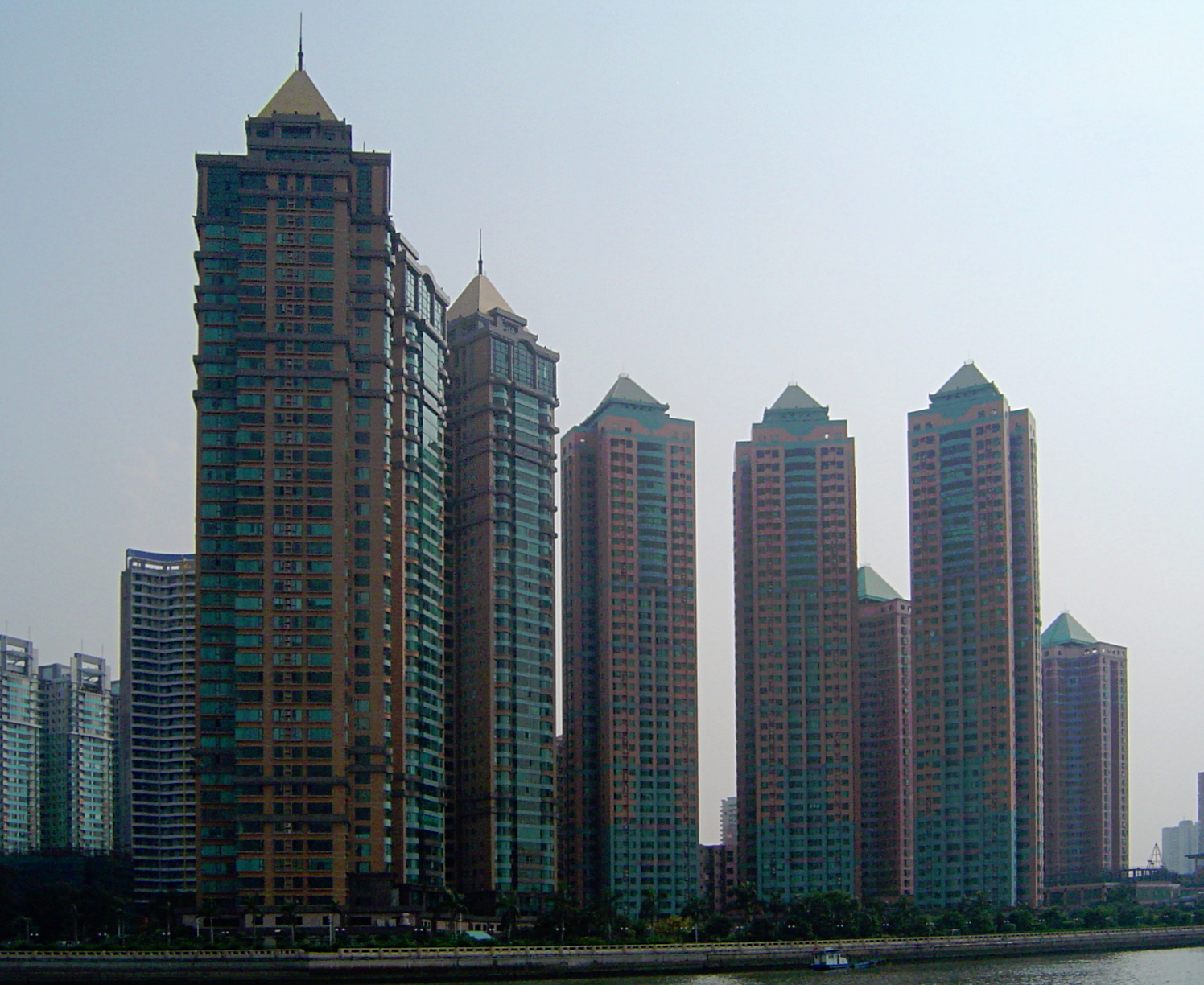
Apartment buildings in Guangzhou

Since 1953, the government of the People's Republic of China has changed its official criteria of urbanization at least six times. In 1949, the year that the People's Republic of China was founded, less than 10% of the population in mainland China was urban. Few cities at that time could be considered modern. The early PRC took a cautious approach to urbanization, with its national development strategy citing the principle of "controlling large cities, developing small cities cautiously."

Throughout the Mao Zedong era, Chinese state planners designed urban areas with an explicit purpose of developing a socialist citizenry, including through the construction of work units called danwei, which provided housing, jobs, food, health care, and other elements of the iron rice bowl on-site. In the view of state planners, the design of the danwei would help promote proletarian consciousness and advance the progress of state socialism.

During the period of the First Five Year Plan (1953–1957), China's urban planning was heavily influenced by the Soviet Union's experience. Soviet urban planners first came to the PRC in 1949 and returned in 1952 and 1955. Soviet experts helped write China's national standards and guidelines and Soviet text books and regulations were translated into Chinese. In the early part of the 1950s, city plans also followed the socialist city planning principles from the 1935 Moscow Master Plan. These principles included maintaining the old city core as administrative areas while building industry on the periphery with green space and residences between the two. During the First Year Plan period, the urban population grew by 30%.

Influenced by Soviet disurbanists, China built satellite towns around industrial centers. Industrial-focused satellite towns include seven built by Shanghai in the late 1950s, among which were Minghang (mechanical and electrical), Anting (automotive), Jinshanwei (petrochemicals), and Wusong (steel).

Urban population experienced a 'great jump' in 1958–1961 during the Great Leap Forward in conjunction with the massive industrialization effort. During the Cultural Revolution years of 1965–1975, urban population growth dropped as a result of rustication. From 1962 to 1978, it is estimated that almost 18 million urban youth moved to the countryside. Overall during the Mao-era, the urban population grew at a lower rate than the rural population did.

However, after reforms were launched at the end of 1978, urban population growth began to accelerate. The inflow of foreign direct investment created massive employment opportunities, which fostered urban population growth. In the 1990s, urban population growth started to slow. This reflected a slower increase in employment growth following the restructuring of the state-owned enterprises (SOE).

Although migration to urban areas has been restricted since the late 1950s, as of the end of 1985 about 33 percent of the population was urban. An urban and industrial corridor formed a broad arc stretching from Harbin in the northeast through the Beijing area and south to China's largest city, the industrial metropolitan complex of Shanghai.

The uneven pattern of internal development and settlement, so strongly weighted toward the eastern part of the country, doubtless will change relatively little even with developing interest in exploiting the mineral-rich and agriculturally productive portions of the vast northwest and southwest regions. The adverse terrain and climate of most of those regions have historically discouraged dense population.

In 1987 China had a total of twenty-nine provincial-level administrative units directly under the central government and the Chinese Communist Party (CCP) in Beijing. In addition to the twenty-one provinces (sheng), there were five autonomous regions (zizhiqu) for minority nationalities, and three special municipalities (shi)--the three largest cities, Shanghai, Beijing, and Tianjin. (The establishment of Hainan Island as a provincial-level unit separate from Guangdong Province was scheduled in 1988.) A 1979 change in provincial-level administrative boundaries in the northeast region restored Inner Mongolia Autonomous Region to its original size (it had been reduced by a third in 1969) at the expense of Heilongjiang, Jilin, and Liaoning provinces. Urban areas were further subdivided into lower-level administrative units beginning with municipalities and extending down to the neighborhood level.

China's urbanization rate was significantly less than the world average, and it began to catch up after 1978. Since 1978, the year-to-year increase in urbanization rate has been significantly higher than in the rest of the world. From 1982 to 1986, the urban population increased dramatically to 37 percent of the total population. This large jump resulted from a combination of factors. One was the migration of large numbers of surplus agricultural workers, displaced by the agricultural responsibility system, from rural to urban areas. Another was a 1984 decision to broaden the criteria for classifying an area as a city or town. During 1984, the number of towns meeting the new urban criteria increased more than twofold, and the urban town population doubled. In the mid-1980s, demographers expected the proportion of the population living in cities and towns to be around 50 percent by the start of the 21st century. This urban growth was expected to result primarily from the increase in the number of small- and medium-sized cities and towns rather than from an expansion of existing large cities.

China's statistics regarding urban population sometimes can be misleading because of the various criteria used to calculate urban population. In the 1953 census, urban essentially referred to settlements with populations of more than 2,500, in which more than 50 percent of the labor force were involved in nonagricultural pursuits. The 1964 census raised the cut-off to 3,000 and the requirement for nonagricultural labor to 70 percent. The 1982 census used the 3,000/70 percent minimum but introduced criteria of 2,500 to 3,000 and 85 percent as well. Also, in calculating urban population, the 1982 census made a radical change by including the agricultural population residing within the city boundaries. This explains the dramatic jump in urban population from the 138.7 million reported for year-end 1981 to the 206.6 million counted by the 1982 census. In 1984 the urban guidelines were further loosened, allowing for lower minimum population totals and nonagricultural percentages. The criteria varied among provincial-level units.

Although country urban population—382 million, or 37 percent of the total population in the mid-1980s—was relatively low by comparison with developed nations, the number of people living in urban areas in China was greater than the total population of any country in the world except India. The four Chinese cities with the largest populations in 1985 were Shanghai, with 7 million; Beijing, with 5.9 million; Tianjin, with 5.4 million; and Shenyang, with 4.2 million. The disproportionate distribution of population in large cities occurred as a result of the government's emphasis after 1949 on the development of large cities over smaller urban areas. In 1985 the 22 most populous cities in China had a total population of 47.5 million, or about 12 percent of China's total urban population. The number of cities with populations of at least 100,000 increased from 200 in 1976 to 342 in 1986.

In 1987, China was committed to a three-part strategy to control urban growth: strictly limiting the size of big cities (those of 500,000 or more people); developing medium-sized cities (200,000 to 500,000); and encouraging the growth of small cities (100,000 to 200,000). The government also encouraged the development of small market and commune centers that were not then officially designated as urban places, hoping that they eventually would be transformed into towns and small cities. The big and medium-sized cities were viewed as centers of heavy and light industry, and small cities and towns were looked on as possible locations for handicraft and workshop activities, using labor provided mainly from rural overflow. The urbanization of small and medium-sized towns has created different challenges for ethnically diverse areas, leading in some cases to an ethnic stratification of labor and greater potential for ethnic conflict.

In official discourses on urbanization in China, Shenzhen is considered the paradigmatic example of the 1980s approach to urbanization.

Since 1983, the trend in urbanization has been to expand cities and turn counties into subdistricts of cities. This process also re-classifies formerly rural residents and farmers into city residents, which provides them with access to urban public goods and services and which increases economies of scale for the provision of urban public goods.

Through the late 1980s and the early 1990s, the municipal government regulatory mechanisms expanded. The power of municipal governments increased, as did their capacity to regulate peri-urban areas. The 1994 fiscal reforms resulted in the need of local governments to generate non-tax revenue, which they did in the form of revenues through land development and use fees. This resulted in their increase in both administrative size and geographic size. The 1994 fiscal reform also impacted patterns of urbanization and domestic internal migration. Under the pre-1994 system of fiscal contracting, township and village enterprises (TVEs) had been an important mechanism of industrialization and most peasants who sought a factory job chose to stay in their hometowns and work at TVEs. TVEs began to decline after the 1994 reform and this contributed to major increases in workers migrating to urban areas.

Urbanization in China greatly accelerated in the 1990s. During this decade, the percentage of China's population which was urban first reached 50%. Extensive urban planning efforts made this urbanization process orderly and, unlike other developing countries, China was able to eliminate large scale squatter towns. In older urban areas, pre-revolutionary housing and danwei compounds were demolished beginning in the 1990s. Many of Beijing's famous hutong lanes were demolished during the period 1989–2019, with remaining lanes often converted into tourist attractions as objects of historic preservation.

In official discourses on urbanization in China, Pudong is considered the paradigmatic example of the 1990s approach to urbanization.

"Themed towns" in China adopt Western-style architecture and urban designs. Among the most significant examples of this approach is Shanghai's One City, Nine Towns initiative, which began in 2001.

In 2005, China had 286 cities. Most of China's cities have a population of one million and below. Shanghai is the largest city in China, with a population of 19 million, followed by Beijing with a population of 17.4 million.

Following the start of the Eleventh Five-Year Plan in 2006, China introduced a series of policies designed to encourage the development of sustainable cities.

The pace of urbanization in China accelerated in 2008. In 2011, a majority of Chinese citizens lived in urban areas and had urban residential status. Since 2013, its urbanization rate is higher than the world average.

During the general secretaryship of Xi Jinping, China's urbanization efforts have aimed at reclassifying millions of rural hukou holders as urban people and resettling them in urban areas. China's goal is to urbanize 250 million citizens by 2025 as the first phase of a long-term green modernization plan. One of the primary mechanisms for working towards this goal is through the settlement of formerly rural people in provincial capitals, prefectural cities, and county-level towns in central China and western China.

Under the 2014 National New-Type Urbanization Plan, the Chinese state seeks increase urban-rural coordination by incorporating rural planning as part of municipal governments' planning processes. The 2014 plan sought to attribute an urban hukou to 100 million people by 2020. It relaxed restrictions on small cities (fewer than 500,000 people) and medium cities (more than 1 million people). It maintained strong hukou restrictions on cities of more than 5 million inhabitants.The National New-Type Urbanization plan also requires 20% of municipal regions to be zoned as ecological protection areas. Xiong'an is presented in official discourses on urbanization as paradigmatic of the 21st century approach to urbanization.

Before the 2020s, the majority of urban growth generally consisted of outward expansion from city centers, mostly into former farmland.

At the end of 2024, the Chinese government stated that the urbanization rate was 67 percent. In 2025, the United Nations calculated China's urbanization rate at 83.7 percent, with the absolute number of people living in cities having peaked in 2021. The United Nations predicts China's urban population to climb to 86.8 percent in the 2030s.

== Characteristics of urbanization ==
China's urbanization has resulted from continuing state efforts, including municipal territory, migration from rural areas to urban areas, and the process of agricultural industrialization making increasing amounts of formerly rural labor available for urban work. As of at least 2023, the state portrays the urbanization of rural people as important for the building of a more equitable society and as necessary to improve the relationship of society to nature and the environment.

According to Bai et al., there are five characteristics of an urban system. The first is that urban areas exchange resources openly with the world outside of the area. One example is when food from farms or gardens are brought into a city for urban dwellers to eat in restaurants or pick up at grocery stores. The second characteristic is that cities are "complex, self-organizing, adaptive, and constantly evolving," (Bai et al. 218). Urban areas have lots of different kinds of people and businesses, and are constantly seeing a change in who is where in the city. Cities often end up organized with different types of people in different areas. People tend to flock towards people with similar interests or life goals. Urban areas have many people who are able to adapt to situations, and can assist each other when something happens to negatively affect the community. The third characteristic according to Bai et al. is that there are multiple agencies. These agencies work both inside and outside the boundaries of the urban area. Agencies work with customers who live and work within the urban area, but also do business with agencies or people living farther away. The fourth characteristic is that urban areas are "embedded" in larger structures that contain the urban area itself. In China, the urban areas are still a part of China, and fall under the Chinese government. The cities themselves are not freestanding structures apart from the country as a whole. The fifth and final characteristic is that there can be intended and unintended consequences of cities. One big unintended consequence is the environmental impact of urbanization.

Urban areas in China have a higher energy consumption than the rural areas of the country. Carbon emissions are increasing more quickly than urban areas can deal with it, causing carbon intensity in urban areas to increase as well. According to Bai et al., research around environmental changes has focused on cities and how they are affected. However, in recent years, the research has started to look more towards solutions for the urban areas instead of only focusing on the problems.

China's urbanization model has been transformed, gradually changing from a traditional urbanization focusing on growth rate to a new type of urbanization focusing on quality improvement.

== Environmental impact ==
The discourse of ecological civilization has influenced the planning and development of eco-cities, low-carbon cities, and green cities in China.

=== Climate change ===
==== Temperature ====
The unparalleled urbanization rate in China is continuing to grow and is resulting in the expansion of urban agglomerations (UAs). In turn, this has significant implications for regional climate and environmental sustainability. Based on the statistical analysis, it is seen that there is a substantial urbanization effect. This effect also contributes to decreasing extreme temperatures and precipitation events in a variety of climate groups. A significant effect of urbanization on hot and cold extreme temperatures is apparent in most urban areas. However, the opposite pattern is seen in arid and high-latitude areas. Around 30% of the total change in extreme temperature events over the core urban areas of 20 UAs is accounted for by the urbanization effect. However, urbanization tends to lead to more regional discrepancies when it comes to extreme precipitation indexes than temperature extremes. The increase of urbanization causes extreme precipitation events to weaken in coastal areas and intensify in central and west China. UAs located in the central and west parts of China tend to experience more frequent and more intense precipitation than those located in the coastal regions. It causes more frequent and more intense precipitation in UAs of inland central/west and less frequent and less intense precipitation in the coastal areas.

In the last few decades, Northeastern China (dongbei) has experienced a rapid urbanization process. In addition to this, it is the country's largest old industrial base. To make accurate predictions about climate change in China, it is necessary to understand the effects of urbanization on temperature changes in Northeast China. According to the analysis of historical climate data, minimum temperatures (Tmin) over Northeast China significantly increased (0.40 °C decade-1) from 1960 to 1989 but did not significantly change (−0.02 °C decade-1) between 1990 and 2016. It is evident that urbanization is increasing the mean temperature of Tmin in Northeast China due largely to the warming effect of urbanization.

==== Population density ====
Urbanization causes a considerable share of rural population migration to urban areas in China. Indirectly, it also causes westward migration from the west to the east. This phenomenon could seriously impact China's greenhouse gas emissions because of China's population size as well as a substantial divide between rural and urban areas in the west. Researchers have undertaken one study to examine these two phenomena. Here, emissions were scaled down to be expressed as per capita, and the impact of the traditional urbanization rate effect was extended to include the population density effect. According to the results of the study, the density of the population has been responsible for the most significant changes in per capita emissions over the past two decades in China, and the elasticity of its effect has changed from positive to negative as each province gained economic development. The intersection of urbanization and greenhouse gas emissions can be highlighted and a change in population density needs to be taken into consideration in order to accurately assess urbanization's contribution to greenhouse gas emissions in the future.

==== CO_{2} emissions ====
There are a number of ways in which rapid urbanization is affecting climate change and China's carbon emissions. Another study estimates CO_{2} emissions associated with residential energy consumption in China's urban households using a cross-city panel comprising 64 cities representative of four large cities in Africa, Europe, and China between 2006 and 2013. After that, the study utilizes an augmented Stochastic Impacts by Regression on Population, Affluence, and Technology (STIRPAT) model to explore the relationship between urbanization and residential CO_{2} emissions over a given period of time using two-stage least squares (2SLS). Based on the results obtained, the average residential amount of CO_{2} emissions in these four areas shows a positive trend that increased from 2.85 to 5.67 million tons of CO_{2} between 2006 and 2013. These areas are more likely to emit CO_{2} emissions from residential areas than those without municipal or capital status. Rising urban populations are clearly affecting residential CO_{2} emissions while simultaneously measuring population sizes, GDP per capita, the compactness of cities as well as the overall level of urbanization. Even after crossing the demarcation point (75%) of urban population share in China's urban agglomerations, the effect of population share on CO_{2} emissions of residential buildings is positive. Residential CO_{2} emissions are negatively impacted by GDP growth in the United States. Consequently, when designing the expansion of urban agglomerations, it must be well-organized. The policymakers in China need to pay greater attention to the urbanization patterns and develop a guide to help guide China's eco-urbanization by encouraging green development and sustainable lifestyle.

== Societal impact ==
=== Labor income growth and domestic consumption ===
China's urbanization, particularly since 1980, has been a major source of labor income growth. Urban workers generally earn approximately 2.5 to 3 times as much as rural workers. Increased urbanization has therefore continually raised both average wages and spendable income for Chinese households, particularly in light of income growth in the service industry, a more prevalent sector in urban areas.

Chinese policy-makers believe that urbanized residents will increase domestic consumption and stimulate economic development, thereby contributing to China's efforts to shift its economy away from manufacturing for export.

=== Floating Population ===
The Chinese government has made considerable efforts in recent years to eliminate the causes of health inequalities caused by household registration restrictions, and the unequal distribution of health services for migrant workers in China. Even so, there may exist an imbalance between migrant workers and locals in terms of health services as well, not only between these groups. As a result, migrant workers' unbalanced utilization of health care services is a problem that merits more attention. The association between socioeconomic status (SES) and healthcare-seeking behavior was examined using data from the 2016 China Migrants Dynamic Survey (CMDS). This analysis utilized multivariate regression in order to establish a causal relationship between SES and healthcare-seeking behaviors. To examine the characteristics of healthcare-seeking behavior between different groups of migrant workers, the study separated migrant workers into various groups, taking into account the SES of each group. There was a significant correlation between SES and the health-seeking behavior of the respondents. The use of high-quality health care services was more likely to be observed among people with high socioeconomic status. The utilization of health services among migrant workers was unevenly distributed based on subdividing the migrant worker category. Multiple measures of healthcare-seeking behavior were significantly influenced by education and income, while occupation did not have any significant effects on behavior. Health services were more likely to be sought by migrants with higher incomes and educational levels. Those with high incomes (over 15,000 CNY) or who have educational backgrounds that are higher than the typical migrant worker were significantly more likely to use health care resources. A lot of attention must be paid to low-education groups and also low-income groups when designing certain policies for improving the health-seeking behavior of migrant workers from diverse socioeconomic backgrounds. In order to achieve health equality among migrant workers and between migrant workers and local residents, policymakers can enhance health education and increase medical subsidies.

As one of the major causes of social inequalities in China, the floating population is also a direct target of the new type of urbanization plan that has been introduced here. The floating population refers to the migrants who are not registered at their place of residence and have limited accessibility to any citizenship benefits at their place of residence. The composition of this population contains a wide range of ethnicities and is dispersed very unevenly throughout provinces, under the jurisdiction mainly of the provincial authorities. Due to the nature of this population, it is still very difficult to determine how it is physically distributed within a province, or whether it is geographically distributed at all, or how it relates to the provincial total population. Cartograms are a technique that was used to analyze county-level census data from the 2010 census. A study conducted in 2000 has shown that the floating population of China is based primarily in three key coastal regions, with a moderate presence in the capitals of the provinces inland, with great differences both within and between those key regions and provinces. Furthermore, there has been a significant increase in the number of people living in the counties near the coast and inland borders, which follows closely after many counties along the coast. In this regard, the hot spots are an important tool to address social inequality as well as materialize new urbanization plans for China.

A survey was conducted on seven hundred and sixty-eight migrant workers who are employed in the urban centers of and all over China, to determine the potential impact of workplace bullying; ten different measures were utilized for this. The paper studies the ex-ante choices of migrant workers relating to their region of employment, the length of stay in their respective companies, their level of education, the decision to transfer their hukou to the town of their workplace, and also their decision to learn their rights and duties in the workplace, which influence the intensity of the bullying encountered at the workplace. All other choices, except for knowledge of the labor law, reduce workplace bullying to a certain extent but may increase in other dimensions. The consensus conclusion is that migrants with middle school and above qualifications tend to experience less workplace bullying when they have similar knowledge of labor law. Most of the ten domains showed the same results across the majority of migrants having a particular qualification across most of the domains.

==== Hukou ====
In the same decade that it began its economic reforms and began to grow at a record pace, China has experienced never before seen levels of urbanization as the world's most populous economy. In 1978, urbanization within China was only 18%. In 1995, the figure reached 30%, and in 2002 it reached 39%, and in 2012, it reached 52.6%. It's estimated that mainland China's population was around 759 million urban residents in 2015 and this was about 55% of the total population. As many as 300 million Chinese now living in rural areas are expected to move into cities in the next decade, according to the Ministry of Housing and Urban-Rural Development. It is crucial to monitor how urbanization will affect Chinese production and international trade in the 13th five-year plan and future five-year plans, as it will be a key scheme to stimulate economic growth in China. A major issue associated with rapid urbanization in China is the impact that liberalizing the factor markets will have on the state's economy. It develops some hypotheses about the distribution of economic benefits of the removal of the systems requiring household registration, which might have a significant impact on income redistribution. These hypotheses are incorporated into a theoretical framework regarding general equilibrium. It is anticipated that some empirical statistics will support these theoretical hypotheses, and some simulation experiments will be conducted based on various policy scenarios, including reforms in both labor and land markets, which are computed using a general equilibrium model (the GTAP model).

As part of its people-centered approach to urbanization, China has officially implemented the transfer of hukou from rural to urban since 2014. The study's purpose is to analyze how urbanization of the people, or in other words, a hukou-based reform target specifically for rural populations, intersects with the urbanization of the land, which is a powerful source of capital and power for the state. A case study of Fang in Guangzhou is featured in the article. It lays out the strategies of social governance that the village applied, specifically how much people were willing to participate when state intervention is stronger, the use of law to resolve conflict, and the state's responsiveness to social demands, all of which are key to achieving state-led urbanization. In fact, the concept of social governance is designed to depoliticize the opposition to state-led urbanization by transforming rural villagers' complaints into a pecuniary discourse in which material gain and loss are debated. This study highlights how China's people-centered planning gives legitimacy and cohesion to local land development practices, which are highly controversial. The important difference between the 2014 Plan and other plans on land development before it was released is that a host of practices had been widely used by local states either separately or jointly, including hukou transfers, accommodating the expression of economic interests by people, and settling conflicts with the use of law and contracts. Several studies suggest that these practices have adverse effects, sometimes adverse to the livelihoods of villagers, as well as boosting the already dominant role of the state, as suggested by existing scholarship and the present study. Xi-Li's packaging of proven local practices now provides a powerful discursive framework to local states who are growing ever more urbanized under state-led policies without showing any sign of taming it. In order to normalize these often highly contested practices, the China new-type urbanization plan can be seen as giving them national legitimacy and programmatic coherence by legitimizing and democratizing them. In order to serve an urbanization process backed by state power, this results in depoliticizing the people's engagement in territorial politics. It appears that these practices "worked" in the Fang Village, as a relatively swift agreement was reached regarding property expropriation, although there was a short-lived resistance.

China has offered migrant labor to support city-centered growth since the 1980s, but has also kept residency by utilizing the hukou system. This rapid reorientation of state power was defined by Mao as a downward shift in state power from a single unitary national scale to multiple local scales, resulting in a new power matrix in terms of geographic space. As globalization, urban reform, and urban integration are gaining traction in cities across China, they are gaining a stronger presence in the global city roster (especially Beijing, Shanghai, Shenzhen, and Guanzhou) through urbanization, land recapitalization, and industrial upgrading for higher land values and productivity of skilled and educated migrants. During the post-Mao era of the 1980s, China's urban spatial movements have been invaded by profit-driven neoliberal forces embodied in the country's market reforms. Labour mobility is allowed to support such movements, but the hukou system is maintained to discourage urban informality and slum formation. Rural migrants with low wages are deprived of local welfare and benefits because their cities don't grant them residency permits (hukou) which essentially deprives them of any security. These are often referred to as "drifting tenants" or the "floating population," often a result of urban renovation, rising rent, and job changes. One study examines the effects of low-skilled and low-wage migrants experiencing frequent shifts in residence, which is a consequence of the hukou system. During February and April 2011, a survey was conducted in the Zhongguancun area in northwestern Beijing to assess the marginalization of displaced migrants. They discuss the causes, patterns, and history of their intra-urban mobility, including their adaptation to change.

Especially in countries like China, where not only the place where one live but also one's living status is of great significance in the daily lives of a person. In addition to establishing a person's status as rural or urban through the hukou system which was introduced in the 1950s, it also plays an important role in determining the individual's well-being. It has long been a priority of many public policy measures to give greater emphasis to those who are urban in addition to hukou holders. As a result, urbanites who have the urban hukou have obtained better jobs, better quality education, and lower premiums for health care. A rural hukou means one has less in all of these respects, even after one migrates to a city. Depending on the place of birth, a Chinese person is either registered with a rural hukou or an urban hukou at birth. As a result, rural hukou holders can expect a less desirable future in many ways than their counterparts who were born in a city. Despite the limitations of having a rural hukou, many people with a rural hukou are moving to the cities increasingly in pursuit of a better future. In addition to doing manual labor, these migrants often work long hours and make less money than those with an urban hukou. This migration stream dominates policy debates in China at the moment. In the eyes of many observers, it's difficult to justify the fact that people with a hukou in the city are treated worse than their peers who do not. By enlarging the number of rural people who move to the cities as well as granting equal social rights to rural and urban residents, the Chinese labour market could become more efficient. As a result of this change, many urban Chinese are experiencing problems such as traffic congestion, housing shortages, segregation and environmental degradation. Chinese hukou reform is therefore a difficult undertaking. As part of the study, a sample of people born in rural China, who have since become urbanized and have a residence permit, an urban hukou, is profiled. They are called hukou converters and the large datasets used to analyze them cover a large area of China in 2002. Hukou converters make up 20% of China's urban population as estimated by the study. There are several factors that may cause the proportion of Hukou converters in the registered city population to be relatively high, including the fact that the city has a high employment rate, that the city is small or medium in size, and that the city is located in the middle part or western part of China. A high level of human capital and belonging to the Han Chinese ethnicity correlates strongly with becoming a hukou converter. In comparison with those who were left behind in the rural areas and those who are migrants with rural hukous, the hukou converters have relatively higher income. A number of factors contribute to these differences, including school years, CPC membership, however, the majority of these differences remain unexplained in a statistical sense. Thus, suggesting large incentives to urbanize as well as obtain an urban hukou. Chinese hukou converters at the destination live a very different life than their peers left behind, but their economic circumstances are, on average, similar to those of their urban-born counterparts. It has been reported that hukou converts who receive an urban hukou before they reach the age of 25 do well in the job market, and in some cases they actually outperform their urban-born peers in terms of earnings. On the other hand, the opposite is true as those who obtain their urban hukou after age 25 do not thrive as well.

=== Education inequality ===
The result of the rapid economic growth and urbanization in China has given rise to a variety of social and environmental problems. The study examined the mechanism and pathways of the effects of education level on energy consumption in order to comprehensively understand the influence of social inequality on climate change. A study was conducted in order to evaluate the impact of education inequality and disparity within the population. In order to do this, indicators were selected to reflect firstly, the educational quality within the population, and secondly, the level of education development. A study from Guangdong Province examined the impact of education level on energy consumption over a period of 14 years from 2002 to 2017. It was based on panel data between 2002 and 2017 and it separated the Pearl River Delta region from the regional data in other areas of the province. An empirical study of educational levels and energy consumption in the two regions indicates that there is a significant disparity between the two. Across the whole of China's Guangdong province, the level of education has had a substantial impact on energy consumption as a whole. The effect is especially noticeable in a city with a lower educational level. There are other factors more important than education, such as the level of income, which seem to have overshadowed this influence in places with a high level of education. Among the non-Pearl River Delta region residents, there is a significant impact of education on perceived energy usage, while within the Pearl River Delta region there is not a significant effect on perceived energy consumption. The results of the study can be interpreted as a recommendation for policymakers to embed low-carbon knowledge and awareness in their educational systems in a way that shows the differences between education stages in different regions. By creating a carbon-neutral community, the residents will be able to develop low-carbon lifestyles and reduce their energy consumption to lower CO_{2} emissions.

=== Income inequality ===
Over the past three decades or so, China has seen two major characteristics of its development: rapid urbanization and rising inequality. China has seen a massive increase in urban population since the start of the open and reform policy in the late 1970s. The numbers increased from 172 million urbanites in 1978 to 749 million in 2014; from less than 20% of the population to over 50%. As a result of China's major urbanization process, the country's economy is booming now. In addition, China's society as a whole is also becoming increasingly modernized. A parallel trend to rapid urbanization in the country is the enlargement of income inequality. The gap is only getting wider and wider. In spite of the widespread praise for post-reformation economic growth, the wealth gap developed as a result of uneven developmental policies and persistent disparities in the distribution system. A recent survey estimates that the national wealth Gini index could be as high as 0.73 based on official statistics. In 2014, China's income Gini index increased from 0.3 in 1978 to 0.5. From 1978 to 2014, this study examined China's urbanization rate and the Gini index using the economic theory of urbanization and income distribution. Using the present argument, a study of income inequality suggests that urbanization effectively reduces it, as indicated by the strong negative relationship between the two indicators at the end of the year (lag = 0). It seems that urbanization, on the other hand, can also contribute to an increase in income inequality after a lagged interval, as evidenced by the positive relationship between urbanization and the Gini index series with lag 1. Unsurprisingly, urbanization correlates with the rise of income inequality, but the lagged aggravating effects of urbanization on the Gini index assist to challenge the belief that urbanization in China only leads to improvement in income inequality. At a deeper level, the results suggest that, in China's transition to a new era of modernization, it is imperative to emphasize the social dimension of urbanization as early as possible. For long-term economic sustainability and prevention of segregation of rural and urban peoples, comprehensive social reforms need to be part of the Chinese national agenda.

The study highlights that in rural China, there is a strong correlation between rural incomes and industrial clusters. The study identifies mechanisms through which industrial clusters in China simultaneously increase rural income and reduce income inequality among rural households. The data used is from rural households from 109 counties in 1995, 121 counties in 2002, and 307 counties in 2007. In addition to a density-based index measuring the existence of industrial clusters calculated from firm-level data. There is also systematic evidence that shows that incomes and inequalities in rural households are not affected by factors such as specialization, urbanization, or urbanization. According to China's experience, industrial clusters created through joint efforts of entrepreneurs and local governments have reduced institutional constraints. Moreover, they have offered rural residents chances to carry out nonfarm tasks. Rural households' incomes increase as a result, and income inequality decreases. Results of this study can assist in reducing poverty and inequality among socioeconomic groups as well as reducing income gaps between them during economic transitions. An analysis of industrialization in rural China connects three major phenomena: industrial clustering, poverty reduction, and income inequality. Clustering helps rural households' total income increase primarily through increases in wage and business income. A significant reduction in income inequality within counties has been found in counties with industrial clusters.

=== Farmland ===
To address concern about China's urbanization reducing farmland, the government put into effect the Basic Farmland Regulations in 1994. In 1999, the New Land Administration Law was passed. These mandated that county-level governments and higher designate areas in every township or village where farmland would be protected from residential or industrial development.

== World urbanization growth ==
Urban population growth (%)
Region/country	1985–1990	1990–1995	1995–2000	2000–2005
Asia	3.78	3.09	2.88	2.61
South-East Asia	4.11	3.99	3.84	3.40
East Asia	4.08	3.08	2.82	2.52
China	5.04	3.77	3.52	3.08
Europe	0.78	0.37	0.14	0.13
North America	1.24	0.57	1.51	1.37
Oceania	1.52	1.52	1.46	1.40
World	2.70	2.33	2.18	2.04

According to Professor Lu Dadao, president of the Geographical Society of China (GSC), China's urbanization took 22 years to increase to 39.1% from 17.9%. It took Britain 120 years, the US 80 years, and Japan more than 30 years to accomplish this.

== Urbanization data by province ==
Urban percentage of the total population by province before 2005
Province Name	1953	1964	1982	1990	2000
China*	13.3%	18.3%	20.9%	26.4%	36.2%
Beijing	74.3%	56.0%	64.7%	73.4%	77.5%
Shanghai					
Tianjin					
Hebei					
Shanxi					
Inner Mongolia					
Liaoning					
Jilin					
Heilongjiang					
Jiangsu					
Zhejiang					
Anhui					
Fujian		13.3%	21.2%	21.4%	42.0%
Jiangxi					
Shandong					
Henan					
Hubei					
Hunan					
Guangdong					
Guangxi					
Hainan					
Chongqing					
Sichuan					
Guizhou					
Yunnan					
Tibet					
Shaanxi					
Gansu					
Qinghai					
Ningxia					
Xinjiang					

Urban percentage of the total population by province
Province Name	2005	2010	2011	2012	2013	2014	2015	2016	2017	2018	2019	2020	2021	2022	2023	2024	2025
China*	42.99%	49.95%	51.83%	53.10%	54.49%	55.75%	57.33%	58.84%	60.24%	61.50%	62.71%	63.89%	64.72%	65.22%	66.16%	67.00%	67.89%
Beijing	83.62%	85.98%	86.22%	86.28%	86.40%	86.50%	86.70%	86.74%	86.92%	87.09%	87.35%	87.53%	87.53%	87.59%	87.83%	88.23%	88.30%
Shanghai	89.10%	89.31%	89.30%	89.29%	89.58%	89.30%	88.53%	89.01%	89.09%	89.13%	89.24%	89.31%	89.31%	89.33%	89.46%	89.84%	
Tianjin	75.14%	79.54%	80.46%	81.57%	82.27%	82.58%	82.90%	83.30%	83.55%	83.95%	84.33%	84.72%	84.85%	85.11%	85.48%	86.00%	86.21%
Hebei	37.69%	44.50%	45.59%	46.60%	48.02%	49.37%	51.67%	53.87%	55.74%	57.33%	58.78%	60.08%	61.14%	61.66%	62.77%	63.42%	64.54%
Shanxi	42.12%	48.04%	49.80%	51.32%	52.87%	54.31%	55.87%	57.26%	58.60%	59.85%	61.28%	62.52%	63.42%	63.95%	64.97%	66.31%	67.35%
Inner Mongolia	47.19%	55.50%	57.04%	58.40%	59.84%	60.96%	62.09%	63.38%	64.61%	65.52%	66.46%	67.50%	68.21%	68.60%	69.57%	70.73%	71.48%
Liaoning	58.71%	62.10%	64.06%	65.65%	66.46%	67.05%	68.05%	68.87%	69.48%	70.26%	71.22%	72.15%	72.81%	73.00%	73.51%	74.18%	74.63%
Jilin	52.50%	53.35%	53.39%	54.52%	55.73%	56.81%	57.63%	58.75%	59.70%	60.87%	61.64%	62.65%	63.37%	63.71%	64.73%	65.77%	66.83%
Heilongjiang	53.09%	55.66%	56.48%	56.87%	58.05%	59.23%	60.47%	61.10%	61.90%	63.45%	64.61%	65.59%	65.70%	66.21%	67.11%	68.04%	68.98%
Jiangsu	50.50%	60.58%	62.01%	63.00%	64.39%	65.70%	67.49%	68.93%	70.18%	71.19%	72.46%	73.45%	73.94%	74.42%	75.04%	75.53%	76.20%
Zhejiang	56.02%	61.62%	62.30%	63.90%	63.93%	64.96%	66.32%	67.72%	68.91%	70.01%	71.58%	72.17%	72.66%	73.38%	74.23%	75.46%	76.36%
Anhui	35.51%	43.01%	44.79%	46.30%	47.86%	49.31%	50.97%	52.63%	54.28%	55.65%	57.03%	58.33%	59.40%	60.16%	61.51%	62.57%	63.60%
Fujian	49.40%	57.11%	58.11%	59.31%	60.80%	62.00%	63.23%	64.39%	65.78%	66.98%	67.88%	68.76%	69.69%	70.13%	71.04%	71.81%	72.58%
Jiangxi	37.00%	44.06%	45.75%	47.40%	49.04%	50.56%	52.31%	53.98%	55.71%	57.35%	59.08%	60.43%	61.46%	62.08%	63.12%	63.77%	64.80%
Shandong	45.00%	49.70%	50.86%	52.03%	53.46%	54.77%	56.97%	59.13%	60.79%	61.46%	61.86%	63.05%	63.94%	64.54%	65.53%	66.48%	67.54%
Henan	30.65%	38.50%	40.47%	41.98%	43.60%	45.05%	47.02%	48.78%	50.56%	52.24%	54.01%	55.43%	56.45%	57.06%	58.08%	59.22%	59.95%
Hubei	43.20%	49.70%	51.79%	53.23%	54.50%	55.73%	57.18%	58.57%	59.87%	60.99%	61.84%	62.89%	64.08%	64.66%	65.47%	66.35%	67.39%
Hunan	37.01%	43.30%	44.96%	46.22%	47.64%	48.98%	50.79%	52.69%	54.62%	56.10%	57.45%	58.77%	59.71%	60.31%	61.16%	62.07%	63.00%
Guangdong	60.68%	66.18%	66.57%	67.15%	68.09%	68.62%	69.51%	70.15%	70.74%	71.81%	72.65%	74.15%	74.63%	74.78%	75.42%	75.91%	76.58%
Guangxi	33.63%	40.00%	41.89%	43.48%	45.11%	46.54%	47.99%	49.25%	50.58%	51.83%	52.97%	54.19%	55.07%	55.66%	56.77%	57.39%	58.09%
Hainan	45.17%	49.83%	50.34%	50.99%	52.28%	53.31%	54.92%	56.74%	58.02%	59.16%	59.40%	60.28%	60.98%	61.44%	62.42%	63.07%	64.08%
Chongqing	45.21%	53.02%	54.99%	56.64%	58.29%	59.74%	61.47%	63.34%	65.01%	66.61%	68.22%	69.46%	70.33%	70.96%	71.67%	72.13%	73.02%
Sichuan	33.00%	40.18%	41.85%	43.35%	44.96%	46.50%	48.27%	50.00%	51.78%	53.50%	55.36%	56.73%	57.82%	58.35%	59.49%	60.10%	61.38%
Guizhou	26.86%	33.80%	35.04%	36.30%	37.89%	40.25%	42.96%	45.56%	47.75%	49.53%	51.48%	53.16%	54.34%	54.82%	55.94%	56.66%	
Yunnan	29.50%	34.70%	36.58%	38.48%	39.99%	41.22%	42.93%	44.64%	46.28%	47.44%	48.66%	50.04%	51.04%	51.72%	52.92%	54.11%	55.02%
Tibet	20.71%	22.67%	22.65%	22.86%	23.97%	26.15%	28.79%	31.47%	33.24%	33.90%	34.63%	35.79%	36.61%	37.36%	38.90%	39.73%	40.11%
Shaanxi	37.24%	45.76%	47.36%	49.72%	51.58%	53.02%	54.73%	56.40%	58.07%	59.65%	61.28%	62.65%	63.63%	64.00%	65.16%	66.15%	
Gansu	30.02%	36.13%	37.26%	38.78%	40.48%	42.28%	44.23%	46.07%	48.14%	49.70%	50.70%	52.22%	53.33%	54.21%	55.50%	56.83%	58.08%
Qinghai	39.25%	44.76%	46.48%	47.81%	49.21%	50.87%	51.65%	53.61%	55.46%	57.24%	58.81%	60.03%	60.94%	61.51%	62.79%	63.91%	64.70%
Ningxia	42.28%	47.87%	50.15%	51.14%	52.85%	54.87%	57.02%	58.71%	60.99%	62.11%	63.60%	64.91%	66.07%	66.35%	67.35%	68.18%	
Xinjiang	37.15%	43.02%	43.73%	44.21%	44.95%	46.80%	48.76%	50.41%	51.90%	54.01%	55.53%	56.53%	57.24%	57.90%	59.24%	60.35%	61.61%

== See also ==
=== China ===
- Urban Planning Society of China
- Metropolitan regions of China
- List of cities in China
- Demographics of China
- Economy of China
- Land use in China

=== World ===
- List of countries by urban population
- Urbanization by country

=== Urban development ===
- Urban renewal (or regeneration)
- Urban decay
- Urban economics
- Urban planning
- Urban planning in communist countries
- Urban sprawl
- New areas
