= Urban Planning Society of China =

Urban planning organization in China

The Urban Planning Society of China (UPSC) (中国城市规划学会), formerly the Urban and Rural Planning Committee under the Architectural Society of China (URPCASC), is a Chinese urban planning academic institution. It was founded in 1956.

== History ==
The Urban Planning Society of China was formerly known as Urban and Rural Planning Committee under the Architectural Society of China. It was ceased for any activity during the Cultural Revolution period and was re-organized in August 1978. In 1992, UPSC formally registered as a non-governmental organization with approval by the Ministry of Construction and Ministry of Civil Affairs. UPSC former and current Presidents are Wang Wenke, Cao Hongtao, Zheng Xiaoxie, Wu Liangyong and Zhou Ganzhi.

== Organization ==
UPSC has four working committees, i.e. organizational, youth, publishing and academic, and eleven academic committees, i.e. regional planning and urban economy, residential area planning, planning and design of landscape and environment, planning and design of historic and cultural cities, application of new techniques, small town planning, overseas urban planning, engineering planning, urban design, city ecological planning and construction, urban safety and disaster prevention planning. The Society administrative function stays at Secretariat with three subordinate offices: the Editorial Department, the Consulting Department and the Liaison Office. The past and current Secretary General include An Yongyu, Xia Zonggan and Shi Nan.

== See also ==
- CAADRIA
- Shanghai Urban Planning Exhibition Center
- Urban Planning in China
- Urbanization in China
