= Frederick Maze =

British civil servant in China (1871–1959)

Sir Frederick Maze KCMG KBE
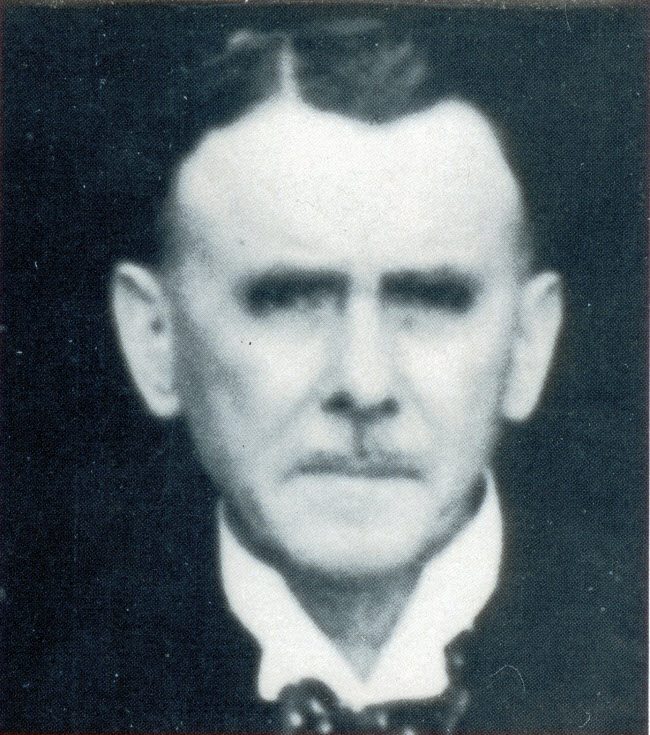

4th Inspector-General of the Chinese Maritime Customs Service
- In office 8 January 1929 – 31 May 1943
- Preceded by: A. H. F. Edwardes (OIG)
- Succeeded by: Lester Knox Little

Personal details
- Born: 2 July 1871 Belfast, Ireland, United Kingdom
- Died: 25 March 1959 (aged 87) Victoria, British Columbia, Canada
- Spouse: Laura Gwendoline Bullmore (1888–1972)
- Relations: Sir Robert Hart, 1st Baronet (Uncle)
- Occupation: Civil servant

Sir Frederick William Maze KCMG KBE (梅樂和爵士; 2 July 1871 – 25 March 1959) was a British civil servant and Chinese customs commissioner, serving as Inspector-General of the Chinese Maritime Customs Service from 1929 to 1943.

== Early years and career ==
Maze was born on 2 July 1871 at 11 Abercorn Terrace in Belfast, the younger son of James Maze, a linen merchant, of Ballinderry, and Mary Hart, one of two daughters of Henry Hart of Lisburn. He was educated at Wesley College, Dublin and later followed his uncle, Sir Robert Hart, into the Chinese Imperial Maritime Customs Service in 1891 and was appointed in 1899 as acting audit secretary at the inspectorate-general in Beijing. By the time of the Boxer uprising in 1900, he was acting commissioner at Yichang. Appointed Deputy Commissioner at Fuzhou in 1901, and at Canton two years later. In 1904 he opened a new Customs House at Kongmoon, serving as commissioner there until 1906. Then he was appointed Commissioner to the town of Tengyue which was the site of a British consulate close to the frontier with Burma, serving until 1908. On 3 June 1909 the Chinese government awarded him with the Order of the Double Dragon, Third Class. The significant rate of Maze's ascension within the customs service did not go without comment however, especially given his familial ties (Hart's successor as acting Inspector-General in 1909, Sir Robert Bredon, was also Maze's mother's and Hart's brother-in-law). Times Beijing correspondent G. E. Morrison in particular made no secret of his abhorrence for the "half-witted" Maze and the nepotism he saw working against more experienced candidates within the service, and at one point noted the lack of promotion for his friend, ornithologist and Customs Deputy Commissioner John La Touche, "who, 35 years in China with world wide reputation, is still Deputy Commissioner under a nonentity named Maze who has been 21 years in China, for 10 of which he has been full commissioner. Such is justice!".

In 1911 Maze was appointed to the senior post of Commissioner in Canton. On 28 March 1914 Maze laid the foundation stone for the new Customs House in Canton and served as commissioner there until 1915, when he was presented with the Order of the Golden Grain, Third Class, which was upgraded to the Second Class in 1919. He was made commissioner in Tianjin (1915–1920), which was then followed by a posting in Hankou (1921–1925). In 1920 Emperor Taishō of Japan presented Maze with the Order of the Sacred Treasure, Third Class. In May 1922 he was awarded the Second Class of the Order of the Precious Brilliant Golden Grain by President Xu Shichang. This was upgraded to the Second Class in 1923. In 1924 Maze was awarded the First Class of the Conservancy Medal. In 1925 he was made Commissioner in Shanghai, then one of the most prestigious posts in the service. In 1917 Maze married an Australian, Laura Gwendoline Bullmore (1888–1972), younger daughter of Edward Bullmore of Oakwood Station and Ipswich, Queensland.

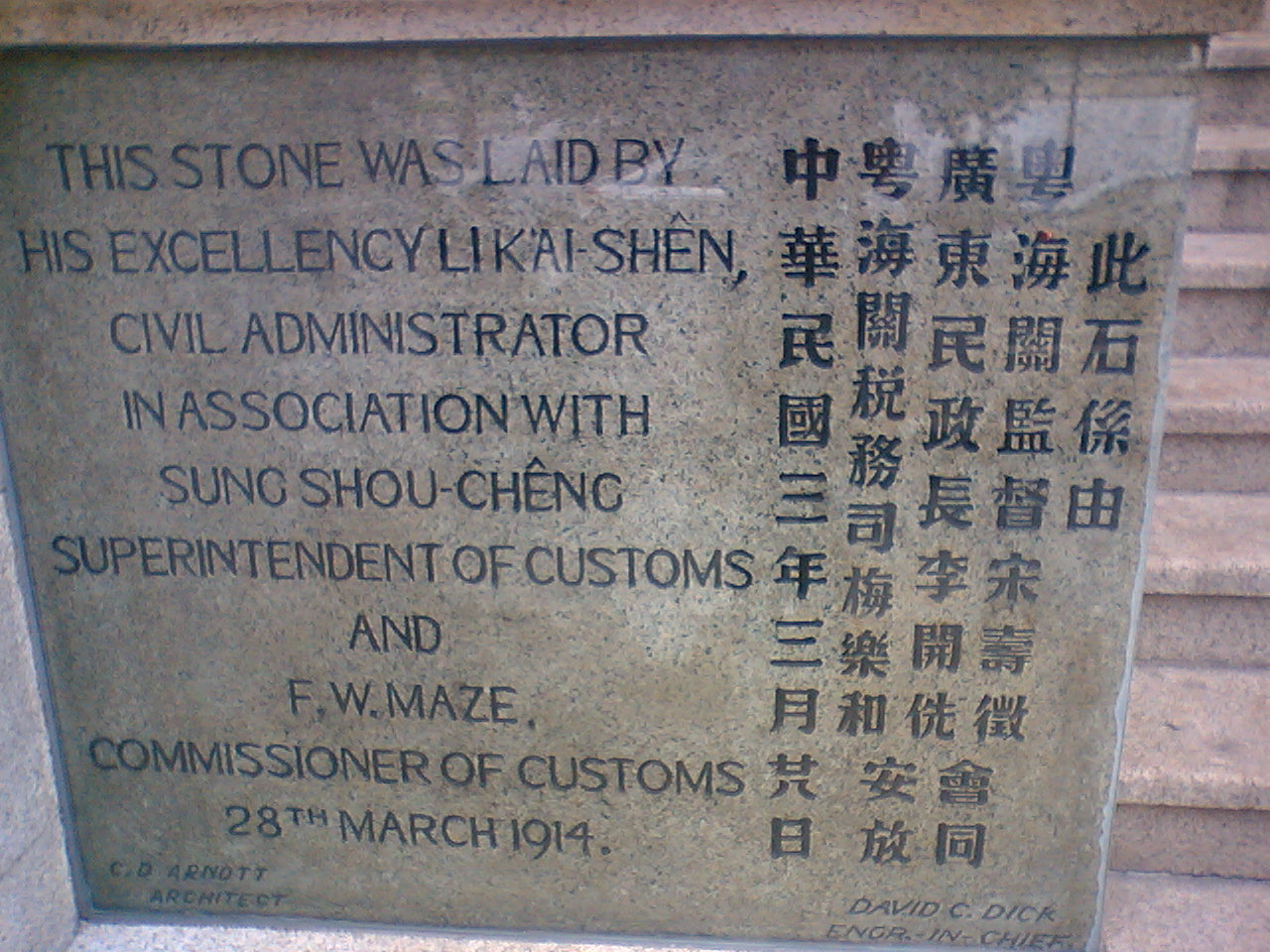
The foundation stone of Canton Customs House.

When Inspector-General Sir Francis Aglen was dismissed by the Beiyang Government in late 1927, he ensured his deputy A. H. F. Edwardes was made 'Officiating' Inspector-General in his place. Edwardes was set to become the next Inspector-General until but with the rise of the Kuomintang (KMT) to be the predominant political force in China, capturing Shanghai in early 1927, Edwardes position was much less certain and Maze, then Shanghai Commissioner, announced his candidacy for Inspector-General. The KMT distrusted Edwardes, seeing him as too connected to the Beiyang government in Beijing, while Maze had had good relations with the KMT and Sun Yat-Sen during his posting in Canton. The KMT, in the process of deposing the internationally recognised Beiyang warlords in Beijing, offered Maze the position of 'Inspector-General' in the south three times in 1927, but he refused. Maze was awarded the Second Class of the Order of the Striped Tiger in 1927. In 1928 he accepted an appointment as an adviser to the national board of reconstruction, and in October 1928 Edwardes appointed Maze as Deputy Inspector-General.

== Inspector-General of Customs ==
Maze in his diplomatic uniform as a delegate to the Coronation of King George VI, May 1937.

Feeling a lack of support, particularly from the new KMT government in Nanjing from 1928, Edwardes resigned from the Customs Service on 31 December 1928 and Maze was chosen to be the new Inspector-General. Taking up his appointment in Shanghai on 10 January 1929, Maze took his oath to the KMT and bowed to Sun Yat-Sen's portrait in a ceremony that the foreign community of Shanghai described as an "Unfortunate precedent". As the new Inspector-General Maze moved the headquarters of the Customs Service to Shanghai and Nanjing and decreed that no new foreigners would be employed in the service, except where a specific or technical qualification was required.

On 16 June 1930, the Customs Service was thrown into crisis when an unscrupulous British journalist Bertram Lenox Simpson seized control of the Tianjin Customs House and appointed himself the Chief Customs Commissioner of Tianjin. Two of the northern warlords, General Yan Xishan, the "Model Governor" who ruled Shanxi and General Feng Yuxiang, the "Christian General" who ruled Shaanxi were leading a rebellion against Chiang Kai-shek's government based in Nanjing and Leonx Simpson was working for General Yan. Tianjin was the chief seaport in northern China and served as a gateway to the former capital Beijing, and the Tianjin Customs House was an important source of revenue to whoever controlled it, hence Yan's determination to have the customs revenue for himself to fund his war against the Kuomintang regime. Maze attacked the previous Customs Commissioner, Colonel Bell, for giving up too easily to Simpson, writing in a report: "I consider Bell proved inadequate and handed the situation badly. I instructed him to maintain friendly contact with all classes of Chinese officials, but it seems that his 'cast-iron' Prussian-dragoon attitude irritated all and sundry. It is clear that Simpson bamboozled him completely and in the end swept down on him and mesmerized him. In other words, he was caught napping and Simpson in Bell's presence, actually obtained possession of our code and of my confidential letters and wires-a schoolboy often at least could had prevented this". Maze declared Tianjin a "dead port" that was closed to shipping and disallowed Simpson, stating that the Customs Service did not in any way support him. Simpson recruited a number of dubious characters from the foreign community in Tianjin to work in the Customs House, leading to Maze to write that Simpson's "staff include many ex-Customs foreign employees dismissed for dishonesty or discharged for incompetence!"

Much to Maze's charin, the foreign powers de facto recognised Simpson as the Chief Customs Commissioner and instructed their ships to pay him customs dues, which completely undercut Maze's "dead port" order. An appeal for help to Sir Miles Lampson, the British minister-plenipotentiary to China, was unsuccessful as Lampson regarded Maze's problems with Simpson as "amusing" and took a sadistic pleasure at Maze's predicament in being caught between the two sides in the Central Plains War. Lampson wrote contemptuously in his diary that: "Maze is definitely the servant-and nothing but the servant-of the Nanking government. He merely carries out their orders and has little influence on questions of policy". Maze found himself caught in the crossfire as Chiang demanded that Simpson be dismissed and suspected (wrongly) that the British were backing Feng and Yan against him while Simpson refused to leave his self-appointed position as the Chief Customs Commissioner of Tianjin. The crisis was resolved when Marshal Zhang Xueliang, the "Young Marshal" who ruled Manchuria, came out in support of Chiang, and advanced south to meet up with the National Revolutionary Army which was advancing north, crushing the northern coalition of warlords led by Feng and Yan. Simpson was shot and badly wounded on 1 October 1930 and died six weeks later while Zhang's forces took Tianjin on 3 October 1930. Maze complained about Simpson's murder that "it is deplorable that at the eleventh hour Simpson has been created a sort of a martyr by a handful of Chinese miscreants". However, the Tianjin crisis had shown how easy it was take over a Customs House, which undermined the authority of the Customs Service as Maze noted at the time.

Maze was made a Knight Commander of the Order of the British Empire (KBE) in the 1932 New Years Honours. Maze was also made a Commander of the Order of Leopold (Belgium; 12 February 1930), a Commander of the Military Order of Christ (Portugal; 5 March 1932), a Commander of the Order of St. Olav (Norway; 12 July 1933), a Commander First Class of the Order of the Dannebrog (Denmark; 17 June 1935), the German Red Cross Decoration (Germany; 29 July 1937) and a Commander of the Légion d'honneur (France; 28 July 1937). Maze was appointed by the Chinese Government as a Counselor to accompany Dr. H. H. Kung as part of the Chinese delegation to the Coronation of King George VI in May 1937.

For the coronation Maze commissioned Ede and Ravenscroft to make his Chinese Diplomatic uniform, consisting of a long coat embroidered with corn sheaves in gold with gilt buttons engraved with the letters RC ("Republique Chinoise") in the centre surrounded by the Chinese motif symbolising five blessings, a black ostrich feather bicorne hat cocked with the colours of the KMT, and a gold and pearl-hilt court sword (On Maze's retirement he donated his uniform to the National Maritime Museum, Greenwich). In February 1938 Maze was awarded the Grand Blue Cordon of the Order of Brilliant Jade by the president Lin Sen "In recognition of valuable services rendered by him in the employment of the Chinese Government".

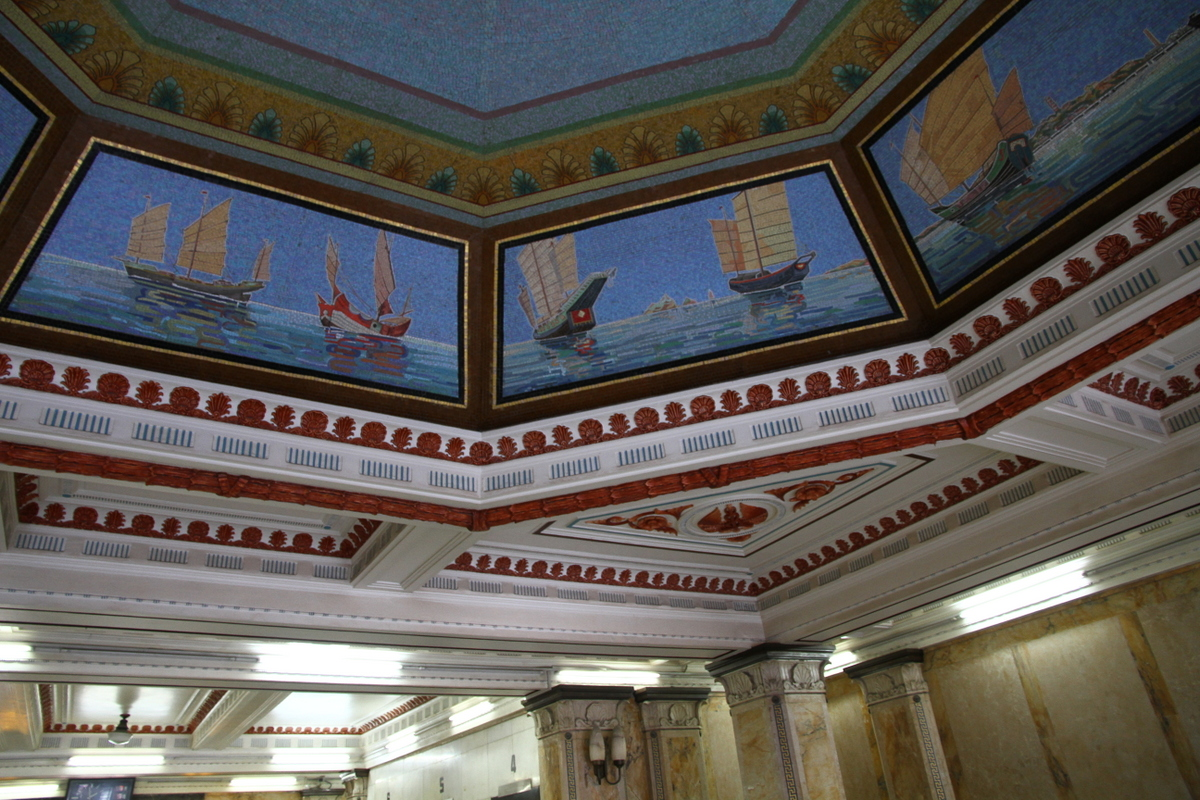
Lobby ceiling of the Custom House, Shanghai.

Like his uncle before him, Maze was an enthusiastic Sinophile, helping to promote many aspects of Chinese culture. Taking a particular interest in Chinese maritime history, when he was Commissioner in Shanghai Maze ensured that many of the interior decorations of the newly built Customs House included maritime elements such as Chinese junks in the lobby ceiling. Maze also assembled a collection of scale models of Chinese junks and sampans, built in Hong Kong and Shanghai under expert supervision. In 1938 he donated this collection to the Science Museum in London.

Maze was consistently praised for his impartial work at the Customs Service, but his work was made much more difficult following the Japanese occupation of Shanghai and Nanjing by late 1937 as a result of the developing war between China and Japan, Chiang Kai-shek moved his seat of government to Chongqing (Chungking). Maze however, his administration safe within the jurisdiction of the Shanghai International Settlement, elected to remain in Shanghai but later complained that "The Chungking government (1,600 miles away) nevertheless continue to expect (at any rate on paper) the Inspector General to execute their mandates and uphold their authority in all the occupied regions, without a vestige of their protection!" Following Japanese entry into the Second World War on 8 December 1941, Maze's decision to remain in Shanghai proved a fateful one when the Japanese occupied the International Settlement that same day. As a result, Maze's duties as Inspector-General of Customs were split between operations within areas controlled by the Chinese government (C. H. B. Joly, OIG) and, until 1945, areas controlled by the Japanese and their puppet government of Wang Jingwei (Kishimoto Hirokichi, OIG 1941–1945).

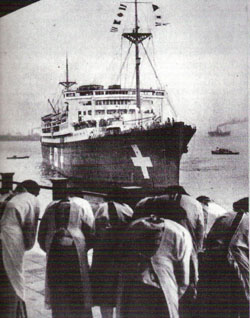
The Kamakura Maru entering Yokohama harbour in May 1942. A month later it despatched Maze and Lady Maze from Shanghai to Portuguese East Africa.

Meanwhile, the Mazes had their house seized by the Japanese, and were forced to live in a small flat for which they had to pay a rental of £14 a month, which came out of the £20 they were allowed to draw from their bank account. By March 1942, in line with increasing Japanese control over the foreign population in Shanghai, Maze was arrested on a charge of espionage. Lady Maze Later recounted that: "It was quite a common occurrence to be arrested for espionage. Anyone who wanted 200 dollars (that was the reward for reporting a spy) went to the police and said that so-and-so was acting suspiciously. Of course, the man or woman was immediately arrested." Maze also later recalled to an audience in Montreal in 1954 that: "I was put in a felons' den ... Not that I was treated badly [by the Japanese], but it was treating me badly to even think of arresting me. I held high decorations from the Government of Japan. Finally I was released when the Japanese authorities in Tokyo realised this was outrageous treatment for a man who had always treated Japanese commerce with absolute impartiality."

Maze was one of approximately 200 Britons and Americans held captive at the infamous 'Bridgehouse' Kenpeitai Prison in Shanghai but was later released in May 1942, and he and his wife were repatriated with other members of the Diplomatic Corps (including the British Consul in Shanghai Anthony Hastings George) in June 1942 on board the Kamakura Maru to Lourenço Marques, Portuguese East Africa. The Kamakura Maru was a liner of the Nippon Yusen line that the Maze's had travelled on many times before. On arriving in Lourenço Marques however Maze acted to return to Chongqing to resume office as Inspector-General and in an effort to help his staff still imprisoned there. Returning on 1 March 1943, Joly retired and Maze served until his own retirement on 31 May 1943 when his assistant Lester Knox Little became his successor, being the last foreign head of the customs service in China. Maze then briefly served as an advisor to the Ministry of Finance.

== Later life ==
On his retirement from the service Maze was awarded by the British government with the Knight Commander of the Order of St Michael and St George (KCMG). After returning from China Maze lived with his wife in Cape Town, South Africa, except for a trip to Sydney in 1946 to visit Lady Maze's family (Her sister Ursula Mary Bullmore was a fashion editor of The Australian Women's Weekly and married Anthony Hordern of the prominent trading family). In 1948 the Mazes then emigrated to Victoria, British Columbia. On 30 October 1950 Pope Pius XII made Maze a Knight Commander of the Order of Pius IX. The Mazes were founder members of the Victoria branch of the English-Speaking Union in 1955. Maze died at the Royal Jubilee Hospital in Victoria on 25 March 1959 and was buried at Royal Oak burial park on 28 March.

== Publications ==
- Maze, Frederick (1950). "Notes on the Chinese 'Yuloh'". The Mariner's Mirror. 36 (1): 55–57. doi:10.1080/00253359.1950.10657578.
- Archives Personal and semi-official letters, letterbooks, reports and circulars belonging to Frederick Maze are held by SOAS Archives.

== Books ==
- Brunero, Donna (2006). Britain's Imperial Cornerstone in China The Chinese Maritime Customs Service, 1854-1949. London: : Taylor & Francis. ISBN 9781134340941.

Government offices
Preceded by A. H. Harris	Commissioner of Customs in Canton; 1911–1915	Succeeded by Henry Merrill
Preceded by R.A. Currie	Commissioner of Customs in Hankow; 1921–1925	Succeeded by J.W.H. Ferguson
Preceded by Leonard Arthur Lyall	Commissioner of Customs in Shanghai; 1925–1929	Succeeded by W.R. Myers
Preceded by A. H. F. Edwardes as Officiating Inspector-General	Inspector-General of the Chinese Maritime Customs Service; 1929–1943	Succeeded by Lester Knox Little
