= Edward Charles Bowra =

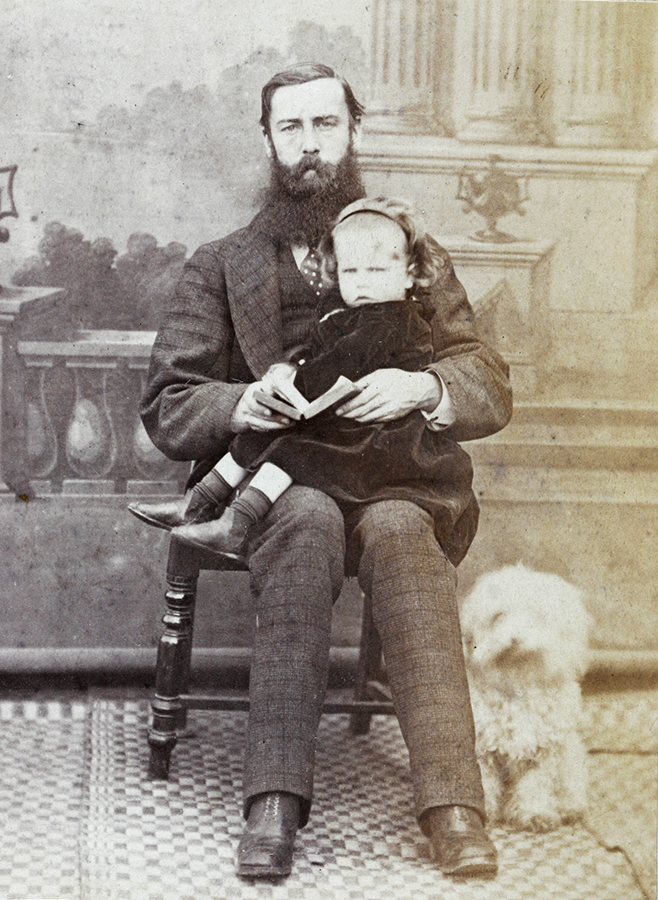
Edward Charles Bowra, circa 1870. The child is possibly his daughter Ethel.

Edward Charles MacIntosh Bowra (1841–1874) was a British citizen serving in the Chinese Maritime Customs working for the government of the Qing dynasty. He was among those treaty port residents who contributed to Western knowledge of China through translations and scientific work.

== Career ==
As an amateur Sinologist and botanist he showed a range of scholarly and practical interests which reflected the then common view that a cultivated gentleman could master Oriental culture. He published a history of the province of Canton (Guangdong), and compiled Index Sinice et Latine for Justus Doolittle's Vocabulary and Handbook of the Chinese Language (1872), but his most widely known accomplishment was a pioneering translation of the first eight chapters of Dream of the Red Chamber in 1868.

Bowra was educated at the City of London College, then served in the London Custom House before he went to Italy to join the British Legion in support of Red Shirts of Giuseppe Garibaldi in their campaign for Italian unity.

== Service in China ==
In 1863 he was appointed clerk in the Chinese Maritime Customs, serving under Sir Robert Hart in Tientsin and Shanghai. He was sent in 1864 as a student interpreter to Beijing, then appointed interpreter in Guangzhou. Bowra organised the 1866 tour for the Chinese Secretary of Customs, Pin Chun. In England Bowra married Thirza Woodward. On his return to China he was sent to Ningbo, where his children Ethel and Cecil were born. He was promoted to Deputy Commissioner in 1872.He organized the Chinese contribution for the Vienna Exhibition of 1873, for which the Austrian government awarded him the Order of the Iron Crown. Bowra died in England at the age of thirty-two in 1874, apparently after over-exerting himself at a garden party. He was buried in the catacombs of West Norwood Cemetery.

His son, Cecil Arthur Verner Bowra (1869–1947) also served in the Chinese Maritime Service. His grandson, Maurice Bowra, born in Jiujiang, became a prominent classical scholar.
