= Bertram Simpson =

Bertram Simpson may refer to:

- Bertram Simpson (bishop) (1883–1971), Anglican cleric
- Bertram Lenox Simpson (1877–1930), British author
