= Order of the Precious Brilliant Golden Grain =

Former award of the Republic of China

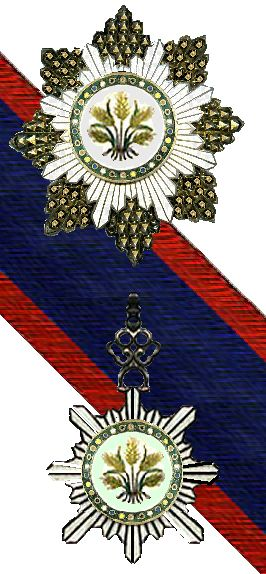
- Country: Republic of China
- Presented by: Republic of China
- Established: 29 July 1912

The Order of the Precious Brilliant Golden Grain (Order of Chia-Ho (嘉禾)), more simply the Order of the Golden Grain, was an award of the Republic of China. The award consists of nine classes.

== Recipients ==
- Francis Aglen
- Albert I of Belgium
- William Beckett
- Léon Bourgeois
- Emily Susan Hartwell
- Hayashi Gonsuke
- Hiranuma Kiichirō
- Frederick Maze
- Alfred Meyer-Waldeck
- Johan Wilhelm Normann Munthe
- John J. Pershing
- Westel W. Willoughby
- Sir Henry Wilson, 1st Baronet
- Leonard Wood
- Ye Gongchuo
- Herbert Giles
- Samuel Cochran

== See also ==
- Order of the Double Dragon: Imperial Chinese award
- Order of Brilliant Jade: Later ROC award
