= John Dudgeon =

Scottish physician

John Dudgeon (1837–1901) was a Scottish physician who spent nearly 40 years in China as a doctor, surgeon, translator, and medical missionary.

Dudgeon attended the University of Edinburgh and the University of Glasgow, in the latter of which he graduated M.D. and Master of Surgery in 1862. In 1863, he was appointed to the Medical Mission of the London Missionary Society to serve at the hospital in Peking established by William Lockhart, arriving in China in December 1863. He was also Medical Attendant to the British Legation in Peking (modern-day Beijing) from 1864 to 1868. Dudgeon was appointed Professor of Anatomy and Physiology at the Imperial College (Tongwen guan) during the 1870s and 1880s. In Wanderings in China, Constance Frederica Gordon Cumming wrote:

Even when the health of the city is at its normal condition the cares of such a hospital as this are serious, and to me it is a source of amazement how Dr. Dudgeon gets through his daily work. To begin with he must personally prescribe for, on an average, 120 hospital patients every morning, besides an extensive outside practice, which includes several of the foreign Legations, and involves driving long distances in the blazing heat and in the horrible springless carts. Two hours a day are devoted to translating useful books into Chinese with his students, besides the labour of preparing and delivering his lectures at the Government College.

He was an accomplished Chinese scholar, and during his long residence at Pekin he studied the manners and customs of the inhabitants, and the semi-annual reports that he forwarded to the Chinese Maritime Customs Service contain a large amount of valuable information regarding the climatic condition, physical features and drainage, and general habits of the people bearing upon health. He was the author of an Historical Sketch of the Ecclesiastical, Political, and Commercial Relation of Russia with China, of a Chinese work 脱影奇观 On the Principles and Practice of Photography, the first of its kind, and of an article in the Pekin Magazine (in Chinese) on the virtues of quinine, in which he pointed out the dangers of the imported spurious article. To the Chinese Medical Journal he contributed papers on A Modern Chinese Anatomist, and A Chapter on Chinese Surgery. He also made several contributions to other medical journals, especially on subjects connected with the medical practice and materia medica of China. Various editions of his Kung Fu books are still available to purchase : "Kung Fu or Taoist Medical Gymnastics: The Art of Shaolin Kung Fu, Traditional Chinese Medicine and Qigong Beginning Practice" and "Chinese healing arts: Internal Kung-Fu" co authored with William Berk. Over a period of 10 years he translated both Gray's Anatomy and Holden's Osteology into an 18 volume Chinese edition.

Dudgeon said that in China, "Infanticide does not prevail to the extent so generally believed among us, and in the north it does not exist at all."

Dudgeon resigned from the London Mission Society in 1884 after conflicts over the prioritisation of evangelical and medical work. Thereafter he continued in private practice in Peking until his death in February 1901.

== Works ==
- "Kung-Fu, or Tauist Medical Gymnastics" (1895)
