= Custom House, Shanghai =

Building in Shanghai, China

Coordinates: 31°14′20″N 121°29′0″E

The Custom House (simplified Chinese: 江海关大楼; traditional Chinese: 江海關大樓; pinyin: Jiāng hǎiguān dàlóu) is an eight story building on the Bund, Shanghai. Built in 1927, the building remains a customs house today. Together with the neighboring HSBC Building, the Custom House is seen as one of the symbols of the Bund and Shanghai.

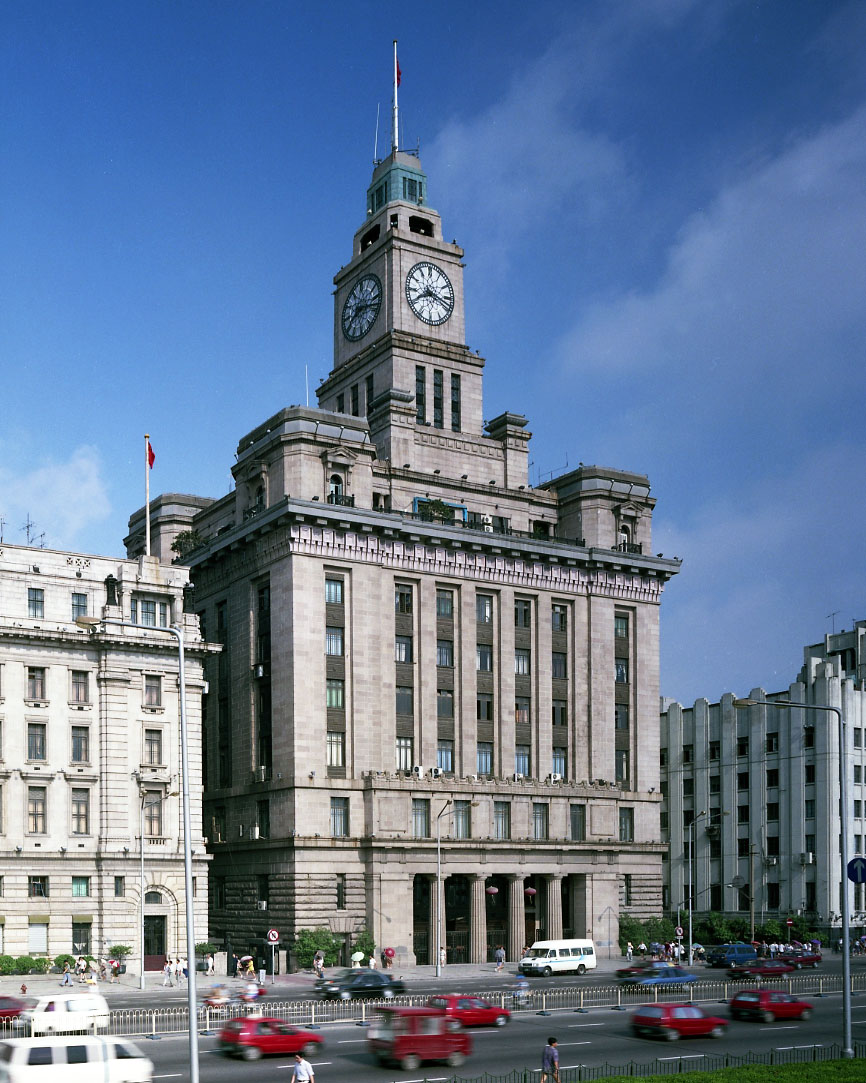
Custom House in 1994

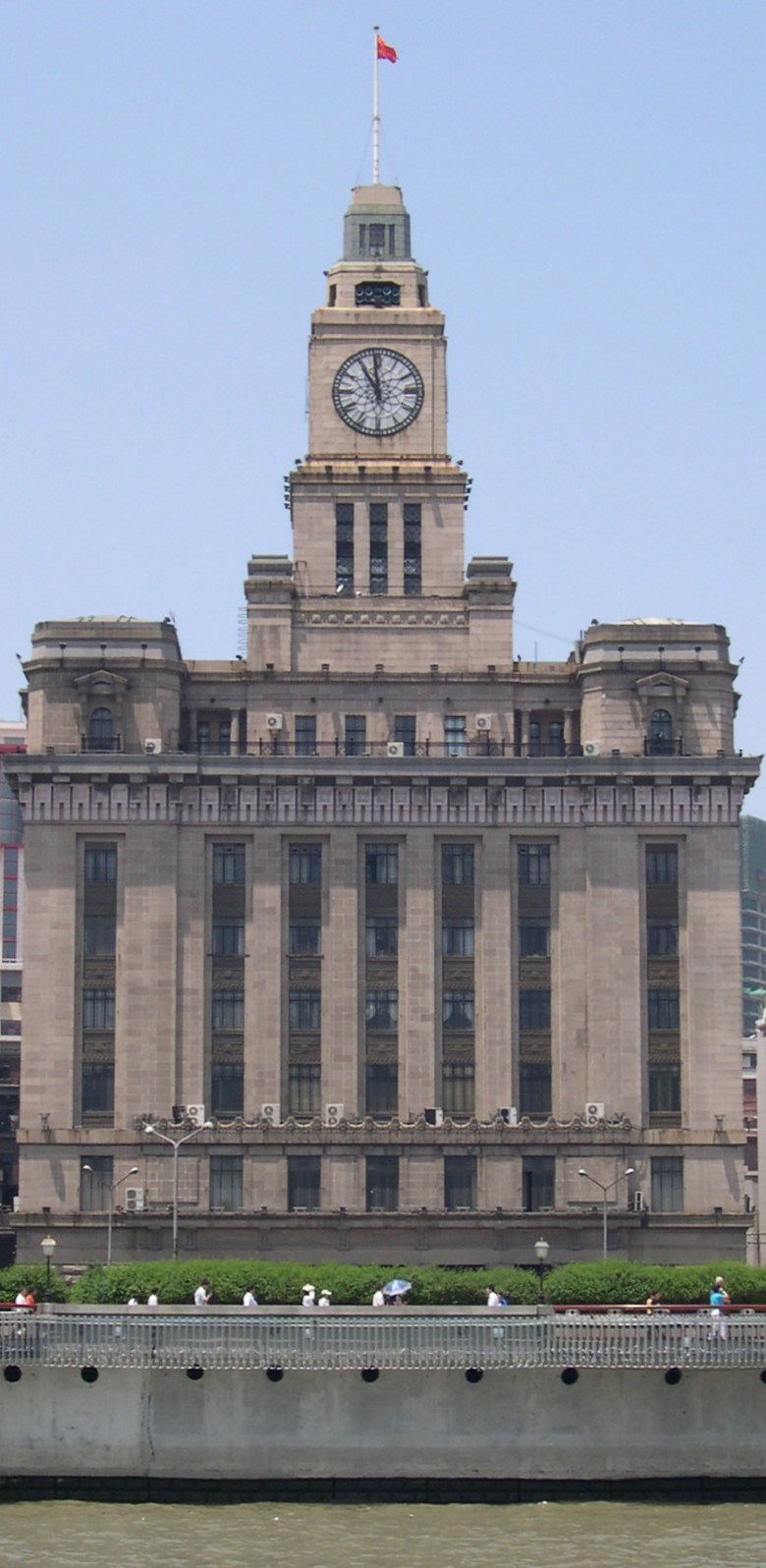
The Custom House seen from the Huangpu river

== History ==
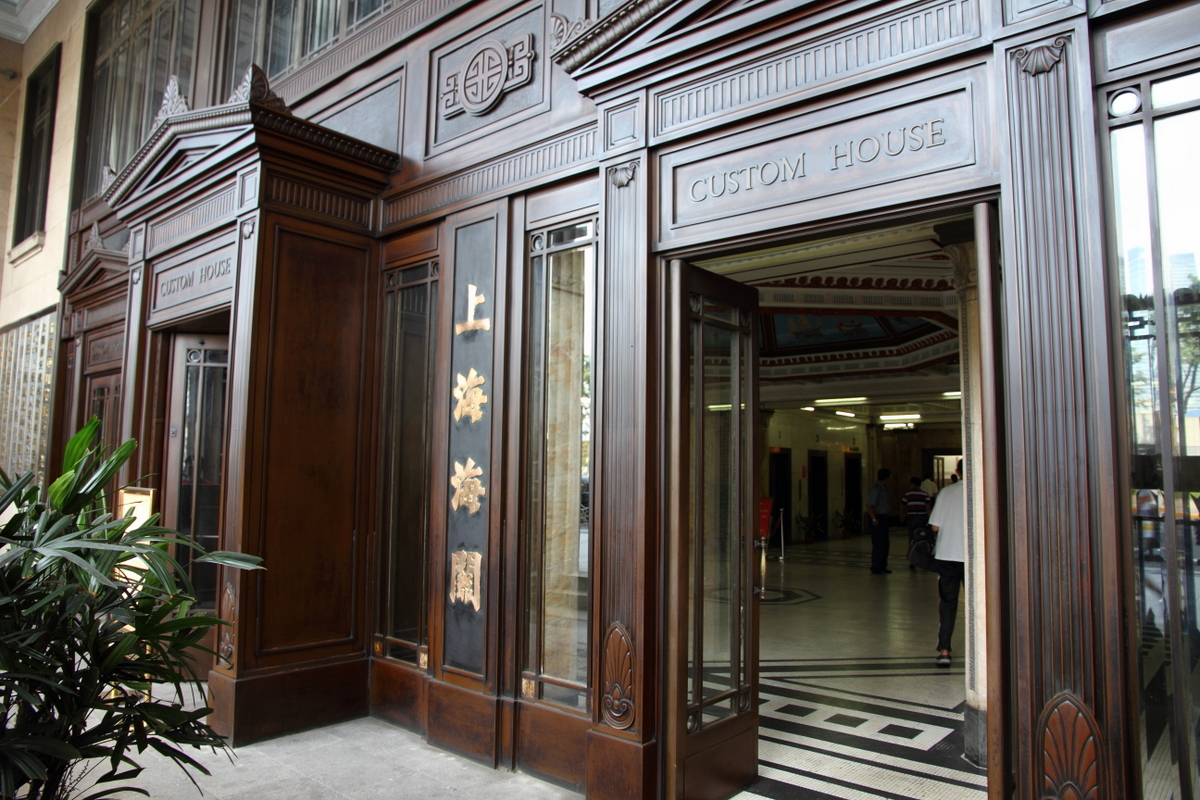
Entrance of the Custom House

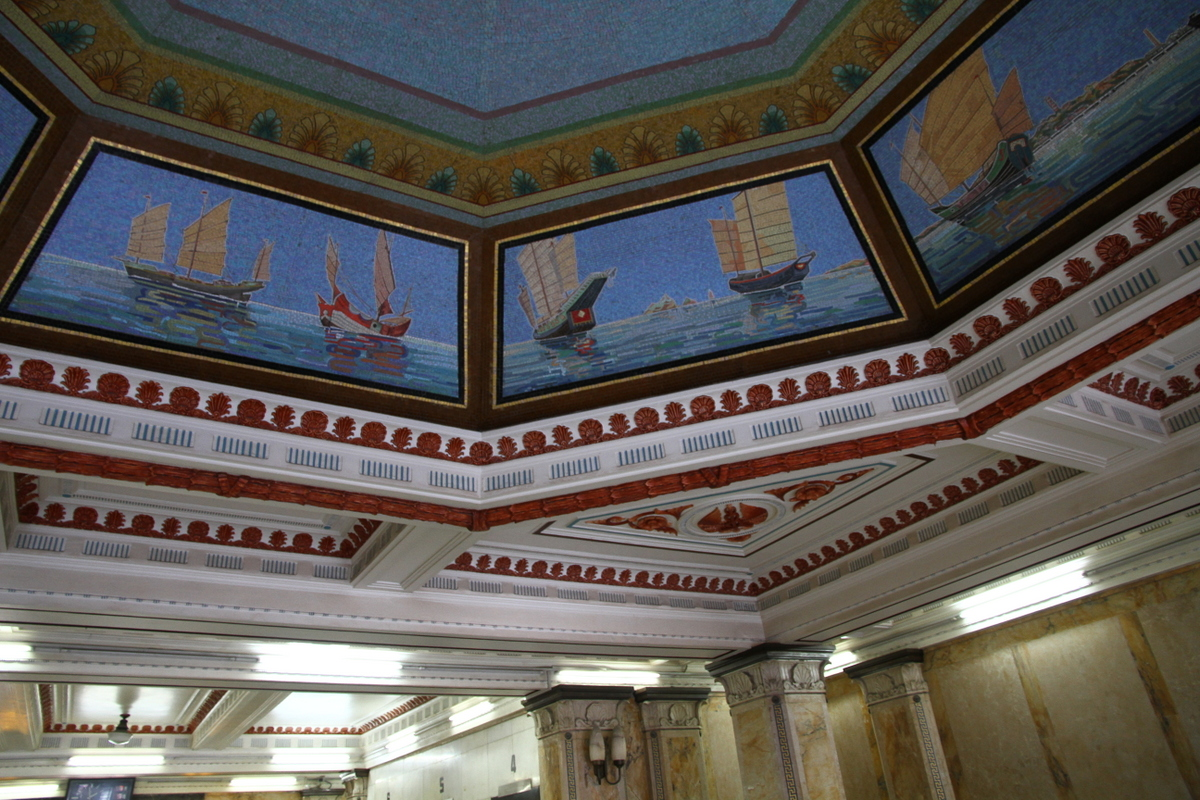
Lobby ceiling of the Custom House

The Shanghai Custom House was first set up in the late 17th century, when the Qing dynasty Kangxi Emperor lifted the ban against sea trade after conquering Taiwan. To facilitate trading along the east coast of China, the Qing government set up customs houses in the four coastal provinces of Jiangnan (now split into Jiangsu and Anhui), Zhejiang, Fujian, and Guangdong. The name "Jiangnan Custom House" was abbreviated to "Jiang Custom House", or Jiang Haiguan (江海關) in Chinese. The principal customs house, originally located at Lianyungang was later set up just outside the east gate of the walled city of Shanghai (then part of Jiangnan Province), by the Huangpu River.

With the development of overseas trade in Shanghai, the location of the customs house became increasingly inconvenient, with foreign merchants preferring to berth their ships further out to sea, near today's Bund. The governor of Shanghai then set up a check point at the south end of the Bund. Upon further insistence by the British consul to move the customs house inside the British concession, a new customs house was built at the present site. This new house is known as the New Custom House, North Customs House, or "Foreign Custom House", whereas the old customs house was known as the "Grand Custom House". In 1853, the rebelling Small Swords Society burnt down the Grand Custom House. In 1860, the Taiping Revolution Army burnt down the rebuilt Grand Custom House. It was decided not to rebuild the Grand Custom House, with the current building becoming the new headquarters.

During these rebellions, British authorities in the city declared the concession to be neutral. They then expelled the Qing officials from the North Custom House by force, on the grounds that they could not collect customs in neutral territory. After the rebellion, Qing authorities in Shanghai were forced to set up their own customs authority, first on two gunboats parked across the river in Pudong, then on the north bank of Suzhou River. However, foreign merchant vessels ignored these ineffective customs posts.

In 1854, the British obtained the power of customs in the concession. Britain, France, and the United States each nominated one person to form a "Foreigners Tax Committee", which operated from the Custom House. Subsequently, the Qing government agreed to appoint a Briton as an inspector general of the newly formed Chinese Maritime Customs Service. In 1857, the Shanghai government spent 6800 taels of silver to rebuild the North Custom House. In 1863, Sir Robert Hart was appointed to the position of inspector general, a position that he held until 1911. A statue of Hart which had originally stood at the junction of Jiujiang road and the Bund was moved to a position in front of the Custom House in 1927. During the Japanese occupation of Shanghai the statue was taken down in September 1943.

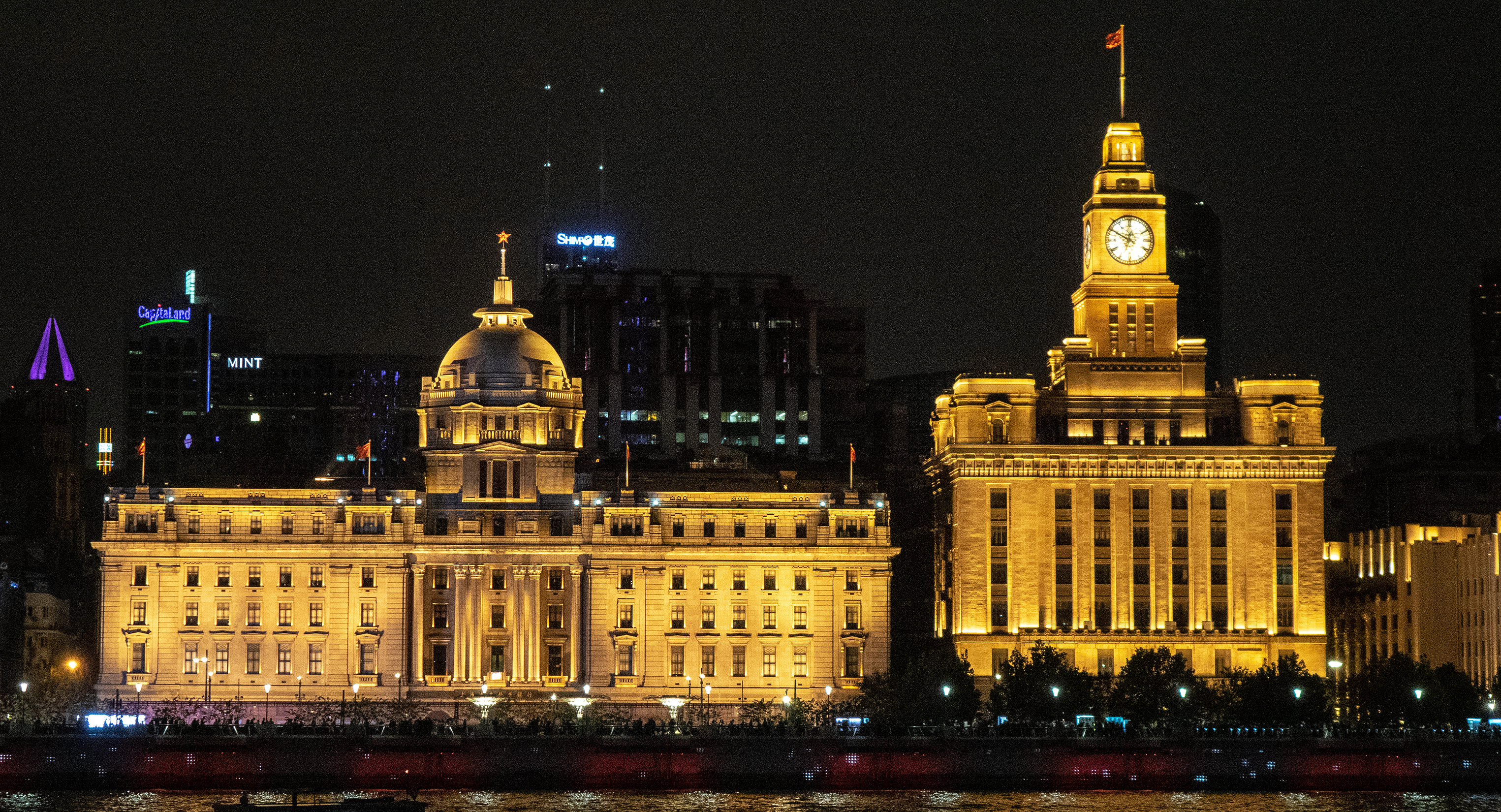
The Hong Kong and Shanghai Bank, built in 1923 beside the new Customs House, built in 1927

As rebuilt in 1857, the New Custom House was in the traditional Chinese Yamen style. It was fronted with a monumental arch or pailou (牌樓) and two flag poles. By 1859, the building had become outdated. The governor of Shanghai then applied for funding to rebuild it. Robert Hart chose a Gothic design, with a five-story rectangular clock tower in the center, and two three-story wings beside it, surrounding a quadrangle. This was built in 1891.

This building was again demolished in 1925 to make way for the current structure designed by architects Palmer and Turner. The new building was completed on 19 December 1927, and cost 4.3 million taels of silver, twice the budget. It was the tallest building on the Bund at the time of construction. The building remains a customs house today.

A few rooms have been used as residences since families moved in after 1949. These are located at the back of the building.

== Layout ==
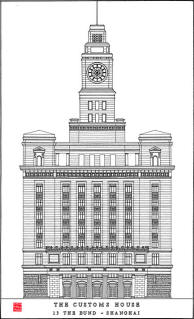
Custom House – The Bund – Shanghai (Elevation)

The present Custom House occupies an area of 5,722 square meters (61,590 sq ft), with 32,680 square meters (351,800 sq ft) of floor space. The building is in two section: the eastern section is eight stories tall and faces the Huangpu River. It is topped by a clock tower, which is eleven stories or 90 meters (300 ft) tall. The western section is five stories tall and faces onto Sichuan Road. A reinforced concrete core was used while the exterior follows a Greek-revival Neo-Classicist design. The eastern section is entirely surfaced in granite, as are the first two stories of the western section, with the upper three stories faced with brown bricks. The main entrance has four Doric columns. Eaves are found above the first and second stories, with a larger one above the sixth floor. Large stone columns penetrate from the third to the sixth story.

Inside the main entrance is the main hall, in which marble columns are decorated with gold leaf. At the center is an octagonal dome, with mosaics on the eight sides.

The most noted feature of the Custom House is the clock tower and clock. The clock tower offers views over the entire Bund and Shanghai city centre. It has four faces, each made up of more than 100 pieces of glass, between 0.3 and 1 meter (1 ft 0 in and 3 ft 3 in) in size. The diameter of each face is 5.3 meters (17 ft), with 72 automatic lamps. The clock and bell mechanisms are built according to the design of Big Ben at the Palace of Westminster. The five bells (largest 6 tonnes) were cast by John Taylor Bellfounders and the clock mechanism was built by JB Joyce & Co in England before they were shipped to Shanghai in 1927. It remains the largest mechanical clock in Asia. During the Cultural Revolution, the clock music was changed to The East is Red. The traditional tune (the Westminster Quarters) was restored in October 1986, when Queen Elizabeth II visited Shanghai. In 1997, however, on the eve of Transfer of sovereignty over Hong Kong, the municipal Communist Party branch ordered the music to be stopped, leaving only the hour strike. In 2003, the tune was changed once again to The East is Red. The clock's bells are not in fact able to play this tune: the music played is in fact a recording played over loudspeakers, but the hour strike used to be played on bells. As of October 2018, the bells no longer play the tones.
