= Chinese Maritime Customs Service =

Former governmental agency of China

- Ensign of the Chinese Maritime Customs Service, 1931–1950

Agency overview
- Formed: 1854
- Dissolved: 1950
- Superseding agency: Directorate General of Customs in Taiwan (ROC) General Administration of Customs in Mainland China (PRC)
- Type: National
- Jurisdiction: Qing dynasty China
- Headquarters: Beijing/Beiping (1854–1929) Shanghai (1929–1941) Chongqing (1941–1949) Taipei (1949–1950)
- Minister responsible: H. H. Kung (1933–1944)
- Agency executives: Horatio Nelson Lay, Inspector-General (1854–1863); Sir Robert Hart (Note: Hart retired in September 1907 but retained his title as Inspector-General until his death in 1911. Sir Robert Bredon was Officiating Inspector-General from September 1907 until his resignation in 1910. Aglen then acted until being appointed official IG in October 1911.), Inspector-General (1863–1911); Sir Francis Aglen, Inspector-General (1911–1927); Arthur Henry Francis Edwardes, Officiating Inspector-General (1927–1929); Sir Frederick Maze (Note: Maze was interned when the Japanese took control of the Shanghai International Settlement in December 1941. As a consequence, until his release in 1943, Maze's functions were split between operations within areas controlled by the Chinese government (C.H.B. Joly, OIG 1941–1943) and, until 1945, areas controlled by the Japanese and their puppet government of Wang Jingwei (Kishimoto Hirokichi, OIG 1941–1945).), Inspector-General (1929–1943); Lester Knox Little, Inspector-General (1943–1950)
- Parent agency: Ministry of Finance

Imperial Maritime Customs Service
- Traditional Chinese: 大清皇家海關總稅務司
- Simplified Chinese: 大清皇家海关总税务司
- Literal meaning: Great Qing Imperial Customs Taxation Service
Transcriptions
Standard Mandarin
- Hanyu Pinyin: Dà Qīng huángjiā hǎiguān zǒngshuìwùsī

The Chinese Maritime Customs Service was a Chinese governmental tax collection agency and information service from its founding in 1854 until it split in 1949 into services operating in the Republic of China on Taiwan, and in the People's Republic of China. From its foundation in 1854 until the collapse of the Qing dynasty in 1911, the agency was known as the Imperial Maritime Customs Service. From the late Qing period to World War II, it was the most powerful bureaucratic body in China.

== History ==
From 1757 to the signing of the Treaty of Nanking by the Chinese and British governments in 1842, all foreign trade in China operated through the Canton System, a monopoly centered in the Southern Chinese port of Canton (now Guangzhou). The treaty abolished the monopoly and opened the ports of Shanghai, Amoy (Xiamen), Ningpo (Ningbo) and Foochow (Fuzhou) to international trade, creating the need for a mechanism to collect customs duties in these additional ports. The Customs Service had significant political regulatory power.

The First Sino-Japanese War (1894–1895) and the increase of foreign concessions in China, led to the foreign powers having conflicts over nationalities' representation in the Customs Service. Britain and Russia had disputes over the number of British or Russian employees hired into the Imperial Maritime Customs Service, which historian Matzuzato connects to the Great Game.

From the late Qing period until the Second Sino-Japanese War, it was the most powerful bureaucratic body in China.

== Organization ==
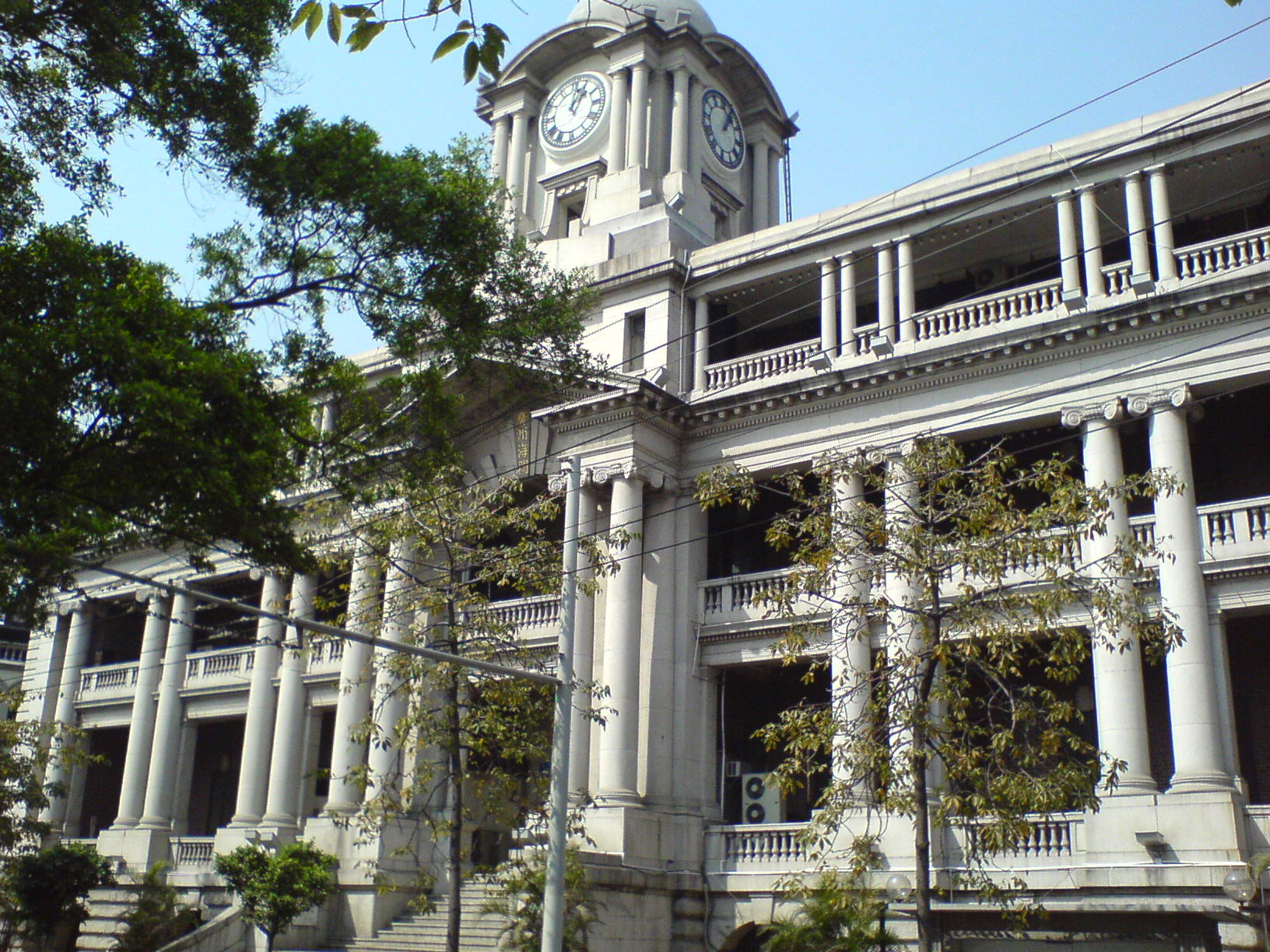
The customs house in Canton. Built in 1914, it was the oldest surviving customs house in China.

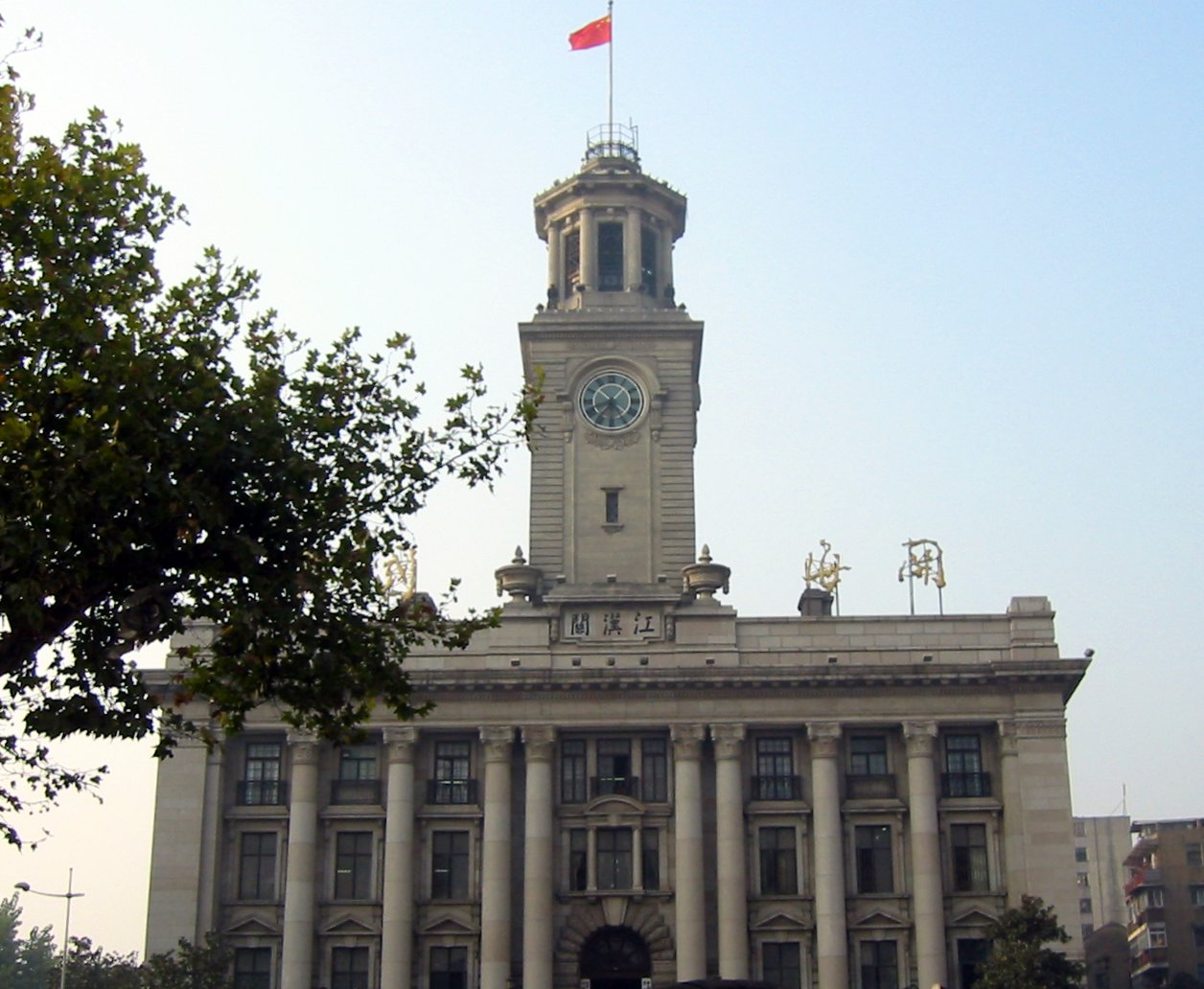
The historic customs house on the Yangtze waterfront in Hankou (Wuhan)

Formally a bureau of the Qing government, the Customs Service was managed by officers appointed by the foreign imperial powers but largely staffed by Chinese functionaries. It was established by foreign consuls in 1854 to collect customs after the Taiping Rebellion weakened the Qing government's ability to supervise trade and taxes.

The Chinese Maritime Customs Service's responsibilities soon grew to include domestic customs administration, postal administration, harbour and waterway management, weather reporting, and anti-smuggling operations. It mapped, lit, and policed the China coast and the Yangtze. It conducted loan negotiations, currency reform, and financial and economic management. The Service published monthly Returns of Trade, a regular series of Aids to Navigation and reports on weather and medical matters. It also represented China at over twenty world fairs and exhibition, ran some educational establishments, and conducted some diplomatic activities. Britons dominated the foreign staff of the Customs, but there were large numbers of German, U.S., French, and later Japanese staff amongst others. Promotion of Chinese nationals into senior positions started in 1929.

The funds that the Customs Service remitted were Beijing's largest and steadiest source of revenue. In addition, foreign trade expanded rapidly because international trade was regulated and predictable. Foreign governments benefited because there was a mechanism to collect revenues to repay the loans that they had imposed on or granted to China. By 1900, there were 20,000 people working in forty main Customs Houses across China and many more subsidiary stations. Revenues collected by the Customs Service were also used to repay loans and the reparations extracted from China by the foreign powers after the Boxer Rebellion.

As academic John Alekna summarises, the Customs Bureau was essentially "a customs bureau, a finance ministry, and a colonial office for the international imperialist regime, all rolled into one."

== Inspectors-General and notable officers ==
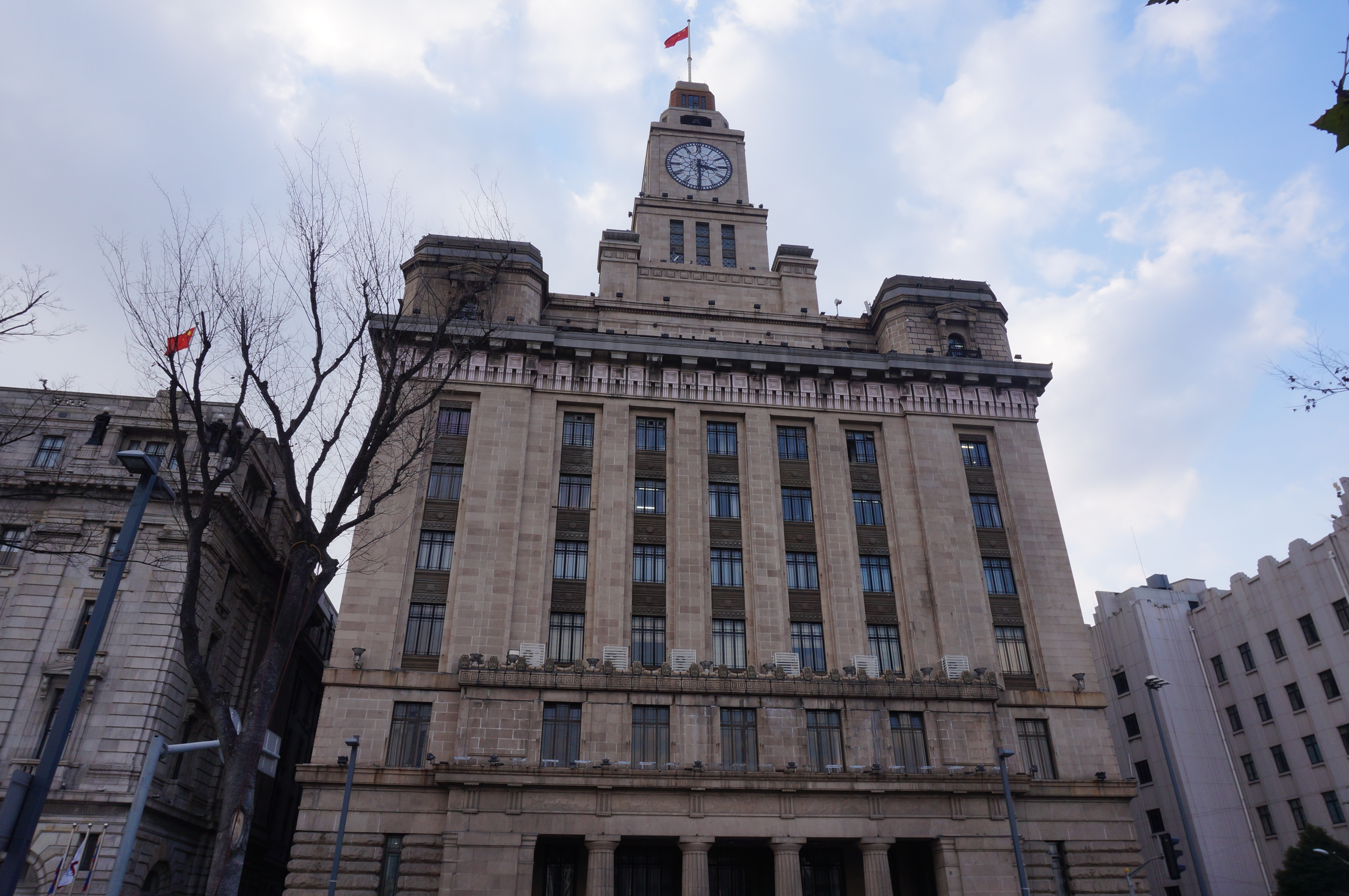
Customs House, Shanghai (1927)

The agency's first Inspector-General (IG), Horatio Nelson Lay (李泰國), was dismissed in 1863 following a dispute with the Imperial court to be replaced by Sir Robert Hart (赫德), by far the most well known IG, who served until his death in 1911. Hart oversaw the development of the Service and its activities to its fullest form. Among his many contributions were the establishment of the Tongwen Guan or School of Combined Learning, which produced numerous translations of works on international law, science, world history, and current events; the postal service; and the Northern Navy. Hart established China's central statistical office in the Maritime Service in Shanghai and the Statistical Secretariat (1873–1950) and following the Boxer Uprising, set up Customs College to provide educated Chinese staff for the Service. According to academic Albert Wu, Hart "held almost autocratic control over the institution."

Hart was succeeded by Sir Francis Aglen (安格联, 1869–1932) and then by his own nephew, Sir Frederick Maze (梅乐和, 1871–1959), who served from 1929 to 1943. In January 1950 the last foreign Inspector-General, American Lester Knox Little (李度), resigned and the responsibilities of the Service were divided between what eventually became the Customs General Administration of the People's Republic of China, and the Republic of China Directorate General of Customs on Taiwan. It was the only bureaucratic agency of the Chinese government to operate continuously as an integrated entity from 1854 to 1950.

Amongst the many well-known figures who worked for the Customs in China were Willard Straight, botanist Augustine Henry; Johan Wilhelm Normann Munthe, Norwegian; Samuel Cornell Plant who was the First Senior River Inspector from 1915 and for whom the Plant Memorial was raised in his honour; G.R.G. Worcester (1890–1969), River Inspector from 1914 to 1948, and author of seven published books on the Yangzi River; novelist and journalists Bertram Lenox Simpson (known as Putnam Weale) and J.O.P. Bland; and historian H.B. Morse. Medical Officers attached to the Customs included John Dudgeon, in Beijing, James Watson at Newchwang and Patrick Manson at Takow and Amoy. The Hong Kong Chinese businessman and political leader Robert Hotung served as a Customs clerk for two years (1878–1880).

A number of early Sinologists emerged from the Service, including linguist Thomas Francis Wade, Edward Charles Bowra, and Charles Henry Brewitt-Taylor.

=== Inspectors-General, full and officiating ===
#	Incumbent	Start of Term	End of Term
1	Horatio Nelson Lay	12 July 1854	15 November 1863
2	Sir Robert Hart	15 November 1863	20 September 1911
–	Sir Robert Bredon	20 April 1908	17 June 1910
–	Sir Francis Aglen	17 June 1910	25 October 1911
3	Sir Francis Aglen	25 October 1911	31 January 1927
–	A. H. F. Edwardes	31 January 1927	31 December 1928
4	Sir Frederick Maze	8 January 1929	31 May 1943
–	C. H. B. Joly	8 December 1941	1 March 1943
–	Kishimoto Hirokichi	8 December 1941	15 August 1945
5	Lester Knox Little	1 June 1943	January 1950

== Life in the customs service ==
Even higher level 'indoor staff' sometimes had difficulties in the nineteenth century, as the value of their salaries varied with the price of silver, and the extra year's pay every seven years which Hart had negotiated for them in place of a pension did not always allow for having an adequate saving for retirement. Family travel costs were at their expense, so not everyone took their due of foreign leave of two years on half pay after the first seven years, and subsequently every ten years. They were subject to all the usual hazards of life in China from illness and civil disruption to difficulties in providing for the education of their children, which often involved family separation, although to some extent this was compensated by the strong esprit de corps. A network of friends was sustained across changes of post by letter-writing, quite frequently by the duty of their wives.

Sir Robert Hart was sometimes a sympathetic boss, but he insisted on high standards of efficiency and honesty, and, for those aspiring to the highest rank of Commissioner, a thorough knowledge of written and spoken Chinese. His most likely young men spent a year or more in Beijing learning Chinese under his supervision, which also allowed him to evaluate other characteristics that would enable them to act sensibly and rapidly in crisis situations demanding immediate response without referral back to him. The compensations included a short working day, which meant the later afternoon could be spent exercising and socializing, going to the races, playing tennis, taking part in amateur dramatics or musical performances, and later enjoy dinner parties, which might include 'absurd games', or a musical interlude.

== Ensigns of the Customs Service ==
State and naval ensign of the Qing Empire, 1867–1911

Customs ensign of the Qing Empire, 1867–1911

Ensign of Chinese Customs (Beiyang Government), 1911–1928

Ensign of Chinese Customs (Nanking Government), 1929–1931

Ensign of Chinese Customs (Nanking Government), 1931–1950 (In use by vessels until 1976)

Flag of the Inspector-General, 1929–1950 and is later used by the ROC Minister of Finance (Minister responsible for customs)

== Archives ==
Records of individual senior and junior staff in the Chinese Maritime Customs are preserved in the School of Oriental and African Studies, London (SOAS). Archives and Special Collections

== See also ==
- General Administration of Customs
- Chinese postal romanization
- Anglo-Chinese relations
- History of foreign relations of China
- Category:Ships of the Chinese Maritime Customs Service
