= Anthony John Aglen =

Scottish civil servant

Anthony John Aglen CB FRSE (1911–1984) was a Scottish civil servant who served as Fisheries Secretary. He was a founder of the North of Scotland Hydro-Electric Board.

== Life ==
He was born in Peking on 30 May 1911 the second son of Francis Aglen of Alyth in Perthshire and his wife, Isabel Marion Agnes Bayley Balfour (nicknamed Senga), daughter of Isaac Bayley Balfour. His father was a servant of the Chinese Imperial Customs, later to be the Chinese Maritime Customs, rising through the service to become Inspector-General of the Chinese Maritime Customs Service from 1911 to 1927.

He was educated at Marlborough College in Wiltshire. He won a place at Cambridge University and graduated BA in 1933. He entered the Scottish Office in 1934 and served as Private Secretary to the Secretary of State for Scotland from 1939, first serving John Colville, 1st Baron Clydesmuir then serving Ernest Brown.

In 1942 he became Assistant Secretary to the Scottish Home Department. From 1946 to 1971 he was Fisheries Secretary for Scotland to the Department of Agriculture and Fisheries. In this capacity he oversaw the construction of the Pitlochry fish ladder (completed 1951) and the Marine Research Laboratory in Aberdeen. He was also pivotal to the creation of the Herring Industry Board and White Fish Authority both of which did much to promote and expand the fishing industry and market at home and abroad.

In the 1940s and 50s he was living at Newmills Farm in Balerno to the south-west of Edinburgh.

In 1963 he was elected a Fellow of the Royal Society of Edinburgh. His proposers were Cyril Lucas, Sir Maurice Yonge, Sir Michael Swann, Vero Wynne-Edwards and John Barclay Tait.

From 1963 to 1966 he was President of the North East Atlantic Fisheries Commission. At this period he was living at Birkhill in Earlston in the Scottish Borders.

He retired in 1971 and died in Edinburgh on 25 April 1984.

== Family ==
In 1946 he married Audrey Louise Murray (1914-2009), his second cousin, daughter of Andrew E. Murray WS of 48 Murrayfield Gardens.
