= Order of Brilliant Jade =

Civilian order of the Republic of China (Taiwan)

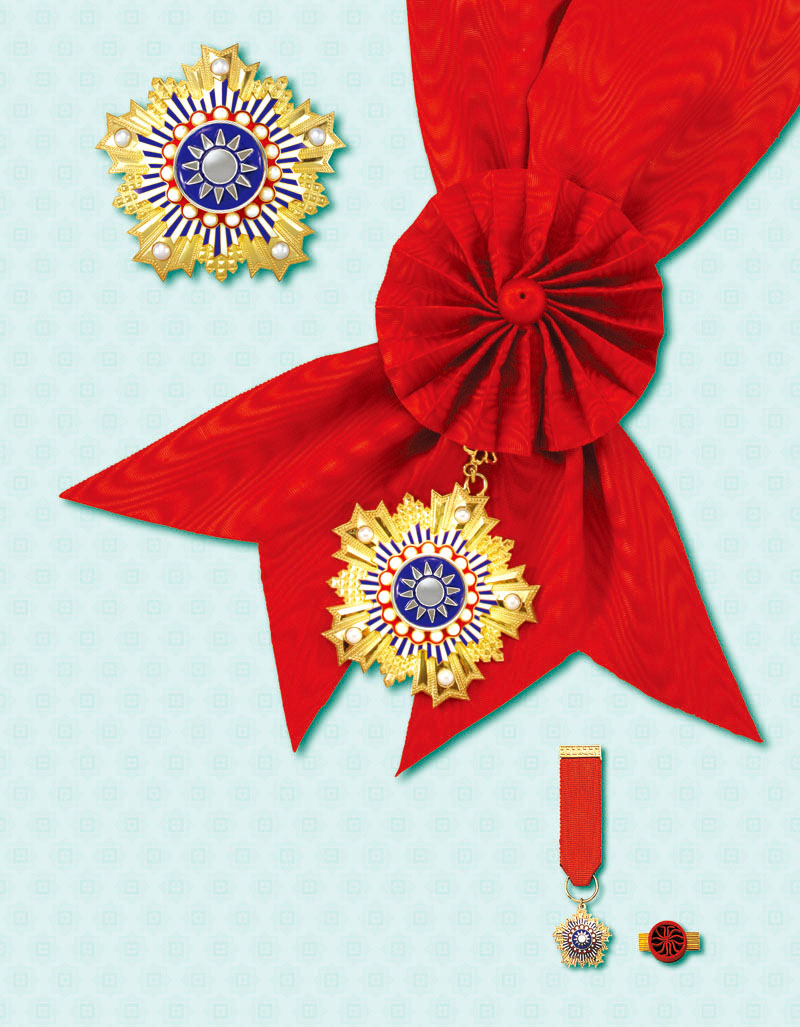
- Order of the Brilliant Jade cordon, badge, star, medal and lapel pin
- Type: Single-grade Grand Cordon
- Awarded for: The President of the Republic of China and foreign heads of states
- Description: The medal has a star-patterned face of inlaid jade bordered with gold and pearls. The center is the "white sun in a blue sky," the national emblem of the ROC, symbolizing a tribute to the head of state internally and the strengthening of friendly ties with other countries externally.
- Country: Republic of China (Taiwan)
- Presented by: President of the Republic of China (Taiwan)
- Eligibility: Civilian
- Status: Active
- Established: 22 December 1933
- First award: Lin Sen

Highlights
- Total: 24
- Ribbon bar of the Order

Precedence
- Next (higher): none
- Next (lower): Order of Dr. Sun Yat-Sen

Order of Brilliant Jade
- Traditional Chinese: 采玉大勳章
- Simplified Chinese: 采玉大勋章
Transcriptions
Standard Mandarin
- Hanyu Pinyin: cǎi yù dà xūnzhāng

The Order of Brilliant Jade is a civilian order of the Republic of China that can be worn only by a head of state. According to regulations, the order can only be presented by the president or monarch of the country or an emissary expressly dispatched to friendly countries for the conferment. The order was instituted on 22 December 1933. It has a star-patterned face of inlaid jade bordered with gold and pearls. In the centre there is white sun surrounded by blue sky, the national emblem. Previously, the Order of the Brilliant Jade was divided into two, namely Grand Order of Brilliant Jade (current) and Order of Brilliant Jade with nine ranks.

== Controversy and suggestions to rename ==
The Chinese official name of the order 采玉大勳章 (cǎi yù dà xūnzhāng) was claimed to be named after President Chiang Kai-shek's mother, Wáng Cǎiyù, by Democratic Progressive Party members of the Legislative Yuan, and there are suggestions from the pan-green coalition to rename the order to suit Taiwanese locality as "Order of Taiwan", but this was not passed at the Legislative Yuan in April 2007, facing opposition from the Kuomintang. In April 2022, the Transitional Justice Commission reported to the Legislative Yuan that there is no documentary evidence proving the Order of Brilliant Jade related to Wáng Cǎiyù.

== Notable recipients ==
- Pakubuwono X (1933)
- Hans von Seeckt (1936)
- Ariyoshi Akira (1936)
- William Henry Donald (1936)
- Edvard Beneš (1936)
- Leopold III of Belgium (1937)
- Minnie Vautrin (1938)
- Frederick Maze (1938)
- Donald Van Slyke (1939)
- Joseph Beech (1940)
- Charles K. Edmunds (1941)
- Chiang Kai-shek (1943)
- Mohammad Reza Pahlavi (1958)
- Bhumibol Adulyadej (1963)
- Faisal of Saudi Arabia (1971)
- Blaise Compaoré (1994)
- Ricardo Maduro (2002)
- Antonio Saca (2004)
- Bingu wa Mutharika (2005)
- Thomas Remengesau Jr. (2007)
- Álvaro Colom (2008)
- Anote Tong (2009)
- Fernando Lugo (2011)
- Juan Orlando Hernández (2016)
- Jovenel Moïse (2018)
- Mario Abdo Benítez (2018)
- Baron Waqa (2019)
- Alejandro Giammattei (2023)
- Santiago Peña (2026)

== See also ==
- Order of the Double Dragon: Imperial Chinese award for foreign recipients
- Order of the Precious Brilliant Golden Grain: Earlier ROC award
