= Johan Wilhelm Normann Munthe =

Norwegian military officer and art collector (1864–1935)

Johann Wilhelm Normann Munthe
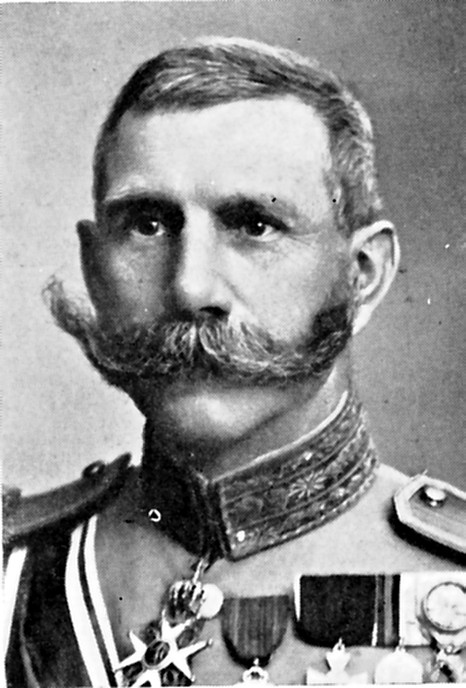
- Photo published in 1934.
- Born: 27 July 1864; Bergen, Norway
- Died: 13 May 1935 (aged 70); Beijing, China
- Military career
- Allegiance: China
- Rank: Lieutenant General
- Conflicts: First Sino-Japanese War; Boxer Rebellion; Xinhai Revolution

Johann Wilhelm Normann Munthe (27 July 1864 – 13 May 1935) was a Norwegian military officer and art collector.

== Biography ==
Munthe was born in Bergen, Norway. He received a military education at the Cavalry Cadet School (Kavaleriets underoffiserskole) in Trondheim. He emigrated to China in 1886, and first started working with the Chinese Maritime Customs Service. He enlisted in the Chinese Army during the First Sino-Japanese War (1894–95). Munthe had mastered the Mandarin Chinese language and remained as a cavalry instructor under General Yuan Shikai. Munthe's association with Yuan Shikai proved advantageous. He advanced in rank to lieutenant General and Chief of Legation Quarters Beijing. He was also an advisor to the Ministry of War; the first and only foreigner to achieve such a position.

Munthe was an avid collector of Chinese works of arts, and his collection includes porcelain, paintings, costumes, and statues in bronze and marble. The collection now resides with the West Norway Museum of Decorative Art (Vestlandske Kunstindustrimuseum) in Bergen.

The Jordan Schnitzer Museum of Art at the University of Oregon also holds a large number of works collected by Munthe and later acquired by the museum's founder, Gertrude Bass Warner (1863–1951).

== Personal life ==
In 1919, he married German-born Alexandra Ethelred von Herder (1867–1920 ). She was the widow of Frederick William Grantham (1870–1915) and was the mother of Sir Alexander Grantham (1899–1978) who was Governor of Hong Kong from 1947 to 1957.

Munthe died during 1935 in Beijing and was buried at the British Municipal Cemetery in Tianjin.
