= Bertram Lenox Simpson =

British writer (1877–1930)

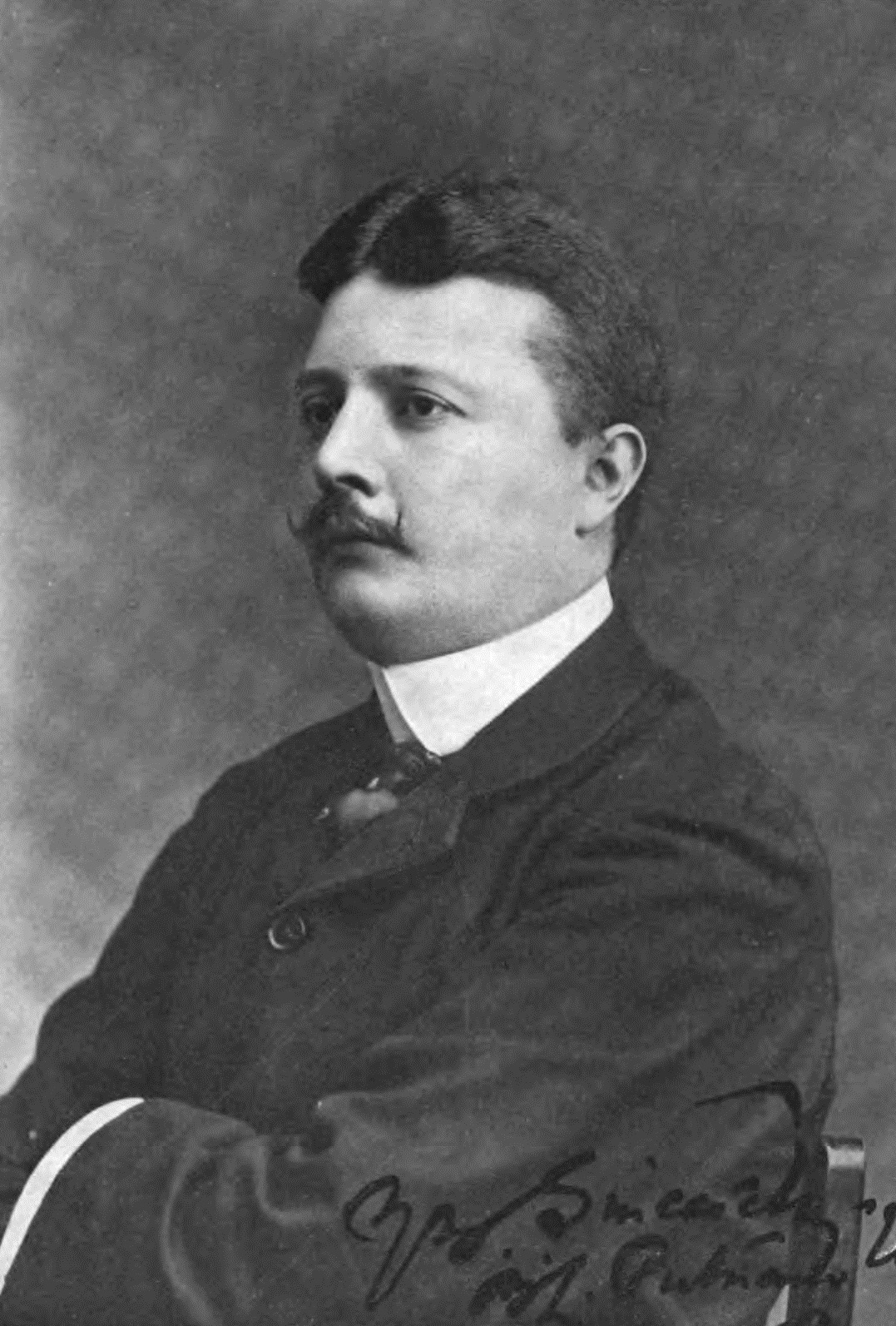
- Born: 1877; England
- Died: 1930 (aged 52–53); China
- Other name: Putnam Weale
- Occupation: Journalist
- Known for: Book: The Fight for the Republic in China

Bertram Lenox Simpson (1877–1930) was a British author who wrote about China under the pen name "B. L. Putnam Weale" (or sometimes simply "Putnam Weale").

== The Boxer Rebellion ==
Lenox Simpson was the son of Clare Lenox-Simpson, who had been in the Chinese Maritime Customs Service since 1861; he had a brother, Evelyn, a mining engineer who worked in China, and a sister, Esme. His education was at Brighton College, after which he too joined the Service. Simpson started to work for the Customs Service in 1896 and his career benefitted from his father's patronage. He was in China during the Boxer Rebellion and during the siege of the legations. After this, he became Brigade Interpreter for the British Expeditionary Force (he spoke 5 languages). Sir Ernest Satow, the British minister-plenipotentiary to China, refused to be introduced to Lenox Simpson when he was at Peking (1900–06) 'on account of his character'.

== Journalist and Writer ==
Lenox Simpson left the Chinese Maritime Customs Service in 1901, perhaps connected with zealous looting after the siege of the Legations in 1900. The British historian Robert Bickers called him "the consummate treaty port jobbing hack, writing commentaries, begging for newspaper work, penning novels... and serving as the Daily Telegraph correspondent in Beijing from 1911 to 1914." Much of his writing in the Edwardian era was given over to defending the treaty port system in China. He remained in China, and began a prolific career writing about China and the Far East.

Lenox Simpson's best-known book, Indiscreet Letters from Peking was published in 1907 and offered up a trenchant defense of British imperialism in China as it recounted his role in the Boxer Rebellion of 1900. Much of his memoir of the year 1900 was concerned with attacking the Foreign Office for being too supine and diplomatic towards the Chinese, and portrayed himself as the man of action, unconcerned with diplomatic niceties, and always willing to do and fight for what is right. In addition in Indiscreet Letters from Peking, Lennox Simpson portrayed both Russia and Germany as rival powers threatening the British empire, which led him to attack the Foreign Office for being too willing to have Britain work with Russia and Germany in putting the Boxers. Furthermore, he complained that the Foreign Office was willing to compromise with both the Germans and the Russians over their claims to have zones of spheres of influence in China, which he saw as a serious threat to the British empire. The overall theme of Indiscreet Letters from Peking was that the British had the world's greatest empire, but were being let down by their leaders and diplomats who were insufficiently aggressive in defending the empire. The Boxer Rebellion, especially the siege of the legations in Beijing in the summer of 1900, had attracted enormous interest in the United Kingdom and came for many British people in the early 20th century what the Indian Mutiny had being for the Victorians, namely a war that was seen as a vindication of the British empire. Moreover, the Boxer Rebellion served as a template for British understanding of China well into the 20th century with the sacking of the British embassy in Beijing in 1967 along with the beating of the British diplomats by the Red Guards being presented by the British newspapers as just another example of "Boxerism". Given the popular interest in the Boxer Rebellion along with Lenox Simpson's self-proclaimed status as the China expert who could explain "Boxerism", the book was a best-seller. Finally, Lenox Simpson's portrayal of a British empire being let down by alleged enervated elite struck a chord with elements of the British public.

His first novel, The Forbidden Boundary (1908) concerned the theme of sex between white men and Asian women, which was the forbidden boundary of the title. Lennox Simpson's book was an early example of the erotic Asian fetish with Chinese women presented as a seductively erotic temptations for British men, albeit with the proviso that such relationships always ended in disaster, thereby appealing to both ends of the British public. In his letters to the editors of his publisher Macmillan, he constantly exaggerated his own status as a China expert while always asking for more money for his books. However, Simpson was well informed on Chinese affairs. As a journalist, he was the first to report that in August 1914 President Yuan Shikai had wanted to declare war on Germany and in a meeting with John Jordan, the British minister-plenipotentiary to China had offered up 50, 000 soldiers who together with the British would take Qingdao, the capital of Shandong province which Germany had taken from China in 1897. Qingdao served as the main German naval base in Asia and was the home of the East Asia Squadron of the Imperial German Navy. Japan had an alliance with Britain and was on the verge of entering the war, and Yuan was emphatic that he did not want the Japanese to attack Qingdao. Yuan predicated (correctly) that the Japanese would take Qingdao for themselves instead of giving it back to China. Jordan rejected Yuan's offer, saying that Britain did not need China's help to defeat Germany. In fact, the British had sent most of their small army to aid France and Belgium, both of which had been invaded by Germany and Britain did not have sufficient forces in East Asia to take the fortress city of Qingdao by itself. Jordan and the Foreign Office just preferred Japanese help in besieging Qingdao as Japan was felt to the stronger power. Qingdao was taken after an Anglo-Japanese siege, falling in November 1914 while the East Asia Squadron had escaped and make an epic journey across the Pacific in an attempt to return to Germany before destroyed by the British in the Battle of the Falkland Islands. The "Shandong Question" as the Sino-Japanese dispute was known as Japan's demanded to take over the former German rights in the Shandong province for itself proved to be one of the more difficult disputes at the Paris peace conference in 1919. Both Lenox Simpson and George Morrison, the Australian journalist who had once served as The Times Beijing correspondent were well aware of Yann's offer and Jordan's rejection. Both journalists felt that Jordan had made a major mistake in rejecting China's offer as both felt the "Shandong Question" could had been avoided if only Britain had solicited the help of China instead of Japan in besieging Qingdao.

Simpson's novels were portrayed China as an exotic and romantic place for tough and rugged individualistic Englishmen to have adventures in, free of any of the social constraints, sexual or otherwise, that governed behavior in Britain. Most of his Chinese novels were presented as romans à chef with the preface to his 1920 novel Wang the Ninth saying this story had "the quality of being true and should therefore be known". His later novels were more sympathetic towards the Chinese than his earlier ones, and usually the villains were Soviet Russia or Japan, through the same theme remained that allowing China to fall into the Soviet or Japanese sphere of influence would be a deadly danger to the British empire. China was in turmoil during this period with the ancient Qing dynasty that ruled China since 1644 being overthrown in the Xinhai revolution of 1911-1912 following by the collapse of the central government after the death of Yuan Shikai in 1916 with various warlords governing different provinces while locked in merciless struggles for power as the warlords fought one another in a series of wars. Lennox Simpson took advantage of the fascination of the British public with what was happening in China with two novels set against the backdrop of the Xinhai revolution and a trilogy of a novels describing the rise of a humble Chinese peasant to being a Boxer and finally a warlord. The voracious desire for power also extended to the wives and concubines of the warlords. Lenox Simpson reported that Li Dequan, the wife of General Feng Yuxiang was a close friend of Han Shuxiu, the wife of General Guo Songling, a subordinate of Marshal Zhang Zuolin, the "Old Marshal" who ruled Manchuria until his assassination by the Japanese in 1928. Li had reportedly "stirred up" Han who in turn urged her husband to rebel against Zhang with the aim of taking Manchuria for himself. In 1925, Guo rebelled against Zhang. However, Zhang had the support of the Japanese Kwantung Army, which had occupied southern Manchuria since 1905 under the terms of the Treaty of Portsmouth, which had ended the Russian-Japanese war. The Japanese saw Zhang as their "man in China" and backed him decisively against Guo's rebellion. Following the failure of the rebellion, both Guo and Han were publicly executed to set an example of the price of treason against the "Old Marshal". Lenox Simpson used the rebellion as an example of the perils of giving Chinese women a western educating, writing "in the end the foreign educated wives got their way with the tragic reasons known".

His 1914 novel, The Eternal Princess has the earliest reference as yet located to the apocryphal sign in Shanghai's Huangpu Park, "No Dogs or Chinese." He wrote in The Eternal Priestess: "There has just been a fierce controversy in the newspapers...over the notice put in the public gardens here. Some fool in the municipality had signboards painted with-'Dogs and Chinese Not Admitted'. Rather rough I call it. If I were one of them I should kill some foreign devil just to equalise matters". The story about the sign saying "no dogs or Chinese" seems to have been Simpson's invention, but it is true that the International Settlement in Shanghai was a strictly segregated city-within-the-city as the British and American residents of the International Settlement disliked having Chinese people in their community. As of 1916 he was working for the political section of the office of the President of China. One researcher reports that "During the period of September 1916 to June 1917, he had written at least thirty-eight reports on foreign affairs for the Chinese government. Many of them were ... read by President Li Yuanhong." His journalistic career in China included periods as editor of the Peking Leader and as chairman of the Far Eastern Times syndicate.

In 1927, he was employed by the Shanghai Municipal Council, which governed the International Settlement in Shanghai, to counter foreign press criticism of the racist laws that governed the International Settlement.. Bickers described Lennox Simpson as being ambivalent in his later writings about China as he continued to defend the treaty port system while often portraying the British residents of the treaty ports as snobbish, greedy, spoiled, selfish, racist and generally unpleasant. Bickers wrote that Lenox Simpson's politics were those of an imperialist committed to upholding the treaty port system while he was also a journalist forever looking for a good story that might him bring some badly needed money. Despite his politics, Lennox Simpson was quite willing to criticise aspects of life in the treaty ports if he thought that might help him sell a story. The theme of his newspaper articles and books was that the treaty port system was being let down by the foreign residents of the treaty ports who were behaving in a manner offensive to the Chinese and the system would work better if the residents of the International Settlement and the other concessions would behave better. The ambiguity of the foreign concessions in China undercut foreign sympathy for them by the 1920s since China was not anyone's colony and the laws in the concessions about where Chinese people could and could not go in their own country seemed outrageous to many even at the time, which led to the defensive quality to the writings done by the residents of the foreign concessions such as Simpson.

== Adventurer ==
By 1930 Lenox Simpson had become thoroughly embroiled in Chinese internal politics and thus took control of customs in Tianjin on behalf of the warlord Yan Xishan. The Foreign Office was strongly opposed to Simpson taking up the side of General Yan who was leading a rebellion of the northern warlords against the government in Nanjing led by Chiang Kai-shek, all the more so because Simpson's fame as a writer and journalist along with his reputation as an unscrupulous intriguer ensured that his involvement in the war was bound to attract media attention. Simpson was distrusted by the British consuls in China who regarded him with much distaste as an intriguer and adventurer. Yan had chosen Simpson because he once worked in the Chinese Maritime Customs Service and therefore had some experience. Beyond that, as a British subject, Simpson had the advantage of extraterritoriality as he was not subject to Chinese law or being arrested by the Chinese police, which made him the ideal man to run the Tianjin Customs office as unlike Chinese citizens he could not being arrested by the Kuomintang. Finally, the Chinese Customs Service was normally run by foreigners, who were usually British, and Yan seemed to have felt that to appoint a Chinese man as Tianjin Customs Commissioner would be seen as a provocation by the powers with extraterritorial rights in China, especially Great Britain.

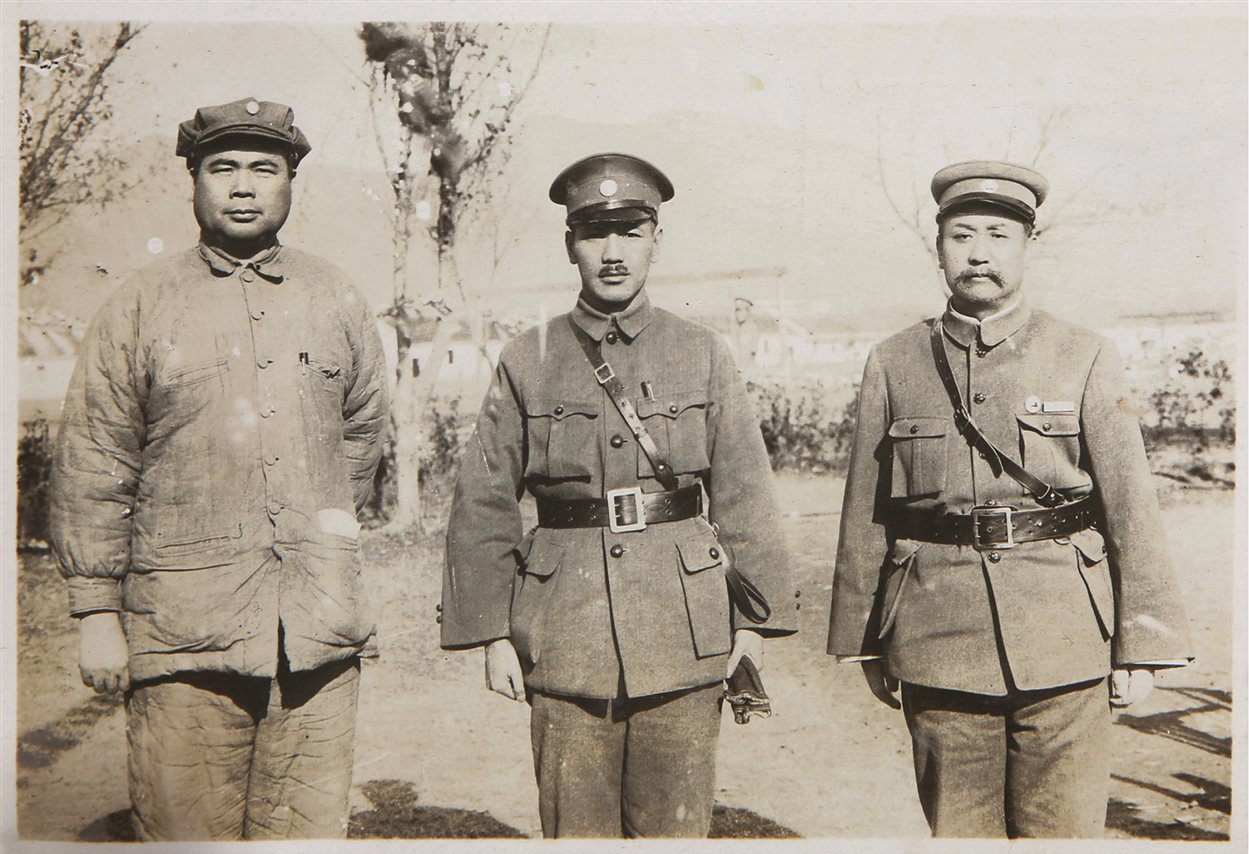
Chiang Kai-shek (in the center), Feng Yuxiang (on the left) and Yan Xishan (on the right) in 1928. During the Central Plains War of 1929-1930 Feng and Yan fought against Chiang.

On 13 May 1930, Sir Miles Lampson, the British minister-plenipotentiary to China, visited Simpson to urge him to cease his work on behalf of General Yan, saying that having a British subject being so openly involved in a rebellion against the government was causing him a great many difficulties in Nanjing. In a report to London, Lampson wrote that the two leaders of the rebellion, the warlords General Yan and General Feng Yuxiang were more "reasonable" than Chiang, but he did not want a British subject so openly involved in a rebellion against Chiang. This was especially the case as there was no guarantee that the two warlords would be victorious against Chiang, who could draw upon all the resources of the Yangtze river valley for the war. Yan known as the "Model Governor" due to his status as a self-proclaimed enlightened dictator with a muddled pseudo-philosophy that combined aspects of Confucianism and liberalism ruled Shanxi province while Feng known as the "Christian General" due to his conversion to Methodism, ruled Shaanxi province. Simpson was opposed to the Kuomintang regime and professed to believe in Yan's claims to be the "Model Governor", through it remains unclear if he actually believed Yan's propaganda about being an enlightened dictator who had created a synthesis of Eastern and Western philosophy. Simpson was especially hostile to the Finance Minister T. V. Soong, the brother of Soong Mei-ling, China's first lady who had married Chiang in 1927. Simpson believed with much evidence that the Soong family, who were China's richest family, had taken advantage of Soong Mei-long's marriage to enrich themselves at the expense of the Chinese people. Simpson had proclaimed "the Customs under the present Inspector-General is not a Chinese institution but a semi-foreign thing which T.V. Soong uses for his own purposes". Lampson wrote: "It is puzzling to know what the wisest course is. Moreover, on the merits of the case, in my opinion Yan has shown a more reasonable attitude than Nanking over this question, nor has Bell shown any special tact. On the other hand, it is most undesirable that a British subject should thus thrust himself or be thrust into the forefront of this affair, especially a man of the type of Simpson". Lampson, a committed imperialist who desperately wanted to be the Viceroy of India one day, had hostile relations with Chiang over the issue of Britain's special rights in China. The entries in Lampson's diary from 1930 indicated that he hoped that the northern coalition of warlords led by Yan and Feng would topple the Kuomintang regime and thereby plunge China back into the chaos that had existed before the Great Northern Expedition of 1926-1927 had established something resembling a strong central government. The British historian Donna Brunero noted that some of the entries in Lampson's diary seemed to imply that it was only Simpson's involvement that prevented him from backing the northern coalition.

On 16 June 1930 along with another British resident in Tianjin, L.C. Arlington, the former Postal Commissioner of Tianjin, the Mayor of Tianjin, the Police Chief, the chief of the Detective Department, and a number of armed men, Simpson marched on the Customs House to inform the Customs Commissioner, Colonel Hayley Bell, that he was now in charge of the Customs office. Arlington recalled: "Hardly had Mr. Simpson begun his conversation with Colonel Bell than all the officials withdrew, leading Simpson and myself to conduct the conversation, which was not of a very pleasant kind. I saw at once that the Chinese officials, as usual, left the fighting-the dirty work-to the foreigner!" Colonel Bell attempted to phone for help, but discovered that the phone lines had been cut in advance. At that point, Bell produced a resignation letter he already written in advance and submitted it to Simpson. Sir Frederick Maze, the Inspector-General of the Chinese Customs Service, strongly criticised Colonel Bell for yielding to Simpson, writing in a report: "I consider Bell proved inadequate and handed the situation badly. I instructed him to maintain friendly contact with all classes of Chinese officials, but it seems that his 'cast-iron' Prussian-dragoon attitude irritated all and sundry. It is clear that Simpson bamboozled him completely and in the end swept down on him and mesmerized him. In other words, he was caught napping and Simpson in Bell's presence, actually obtained possession of our code and of my confidential letters and wires-a schoolboy often at least could had prevented this".

Maze declared Tianjin a "dead port" that was closed to shipping and disallowed Simpson, stating that the Customs Service did not in any support him. Yan was enraged by Maze's "dead port" order and to protect the lives of the Chinese employees of the Customs House, Maze sent one of his employees, Ding Guitang secretly to Tianjin to meet Yan. Ding offered to Yan giving him half of the Additional Duties collected by the Customs House in exchange for dismissing Simpson. Simpson threatened to execute any of the Chinese employees of the Tianjin Customs office that did not recognise his authority. He recruited a number of dubious characters from the foreign community in Tianjin to work in the Customs office, leading Maze to complain that Simpson's "staff include many ex-Customs foreign employees dismissed for dishonesty or discharged for incompetence!" Despite the hostile attitude of the Customs Service, it was admitted that the Tianjin Customs Office under Simpson's leadership was working well and he was very efficient in collecting his customs despite the quality of people he had recruited. Tianjin was the chief seaport in northern China, serving as the gateway to Beijing, and Simpson's takeover of the Tianjin Customs office was a major financial blow to the Kuomintang government in Nanjing, and was widely seen as a sign that the General Feng and General Yan were serious about their plans to topple Chiang. Lampson had disapproved of Simpson's actions, but at same time calculated there was a real possibility of the coalition of northern warlords led by Yan and Feng might defeat Chiang, which led him to rule out any sort of armed action against him. The key figure in the war was Marshal Zhang Xueliang, the "Young Marshal" who had ruled Manchuria, and who had declared his neutrality in the war as he balanced up the offers from the northern coalition and Nanjing. As Zhang was the most powerful of all the warlords, he played the kingmaker in the war as whatever side he backed would probably win. In addition, the Tianjin Customs House was located in the French concession in Tianjin, and the French authorities refused to take action under the grounds that Colonel Bell was unharmed and had signed a resignation letter. Finally, the United States had de facto recognised Simpson's authority and instructed American merchants in Tianjin to pay the customs dues to him. The two nations that made the most use of the port of Tianjin, namely Great Britain and Japan, hedged their bets by sending letters of protest to both Nanjing and the northern coalition. The British, French and Japanese traders in Tianjin had likewise followed the American lead inde facto recognising Simpson's claim to be customs commissioner by paying customs dues. As British and Japanese ships used Tianjin the most, this greatly aided Simpson's efforts to collect revenue for Yan. Maze complained that Lionel Giles, the British consul in Tianjin, seemed to be supporting Simpson's claim to be the Chief Customs Commissioner. Maze wrote to London: "Tientsin consular tacit recognition of Simpson's improvised Customs arrangement is prejudicing efforts to effect compromise this end". The Chinese legation in London submitted a note of protest against Simpson's actions while the Chinese Foreign Minister Wang Zhengting in a letter to T.V. Soong complained that Lampson had known in advance of Simpson's plans. Su Tiren, Yan's special financial commissioner for Hebei province, later claimed that Simpson "had acted without the Marshal's knowledge", through the Dutch historian Hans van de Ven noted that this claim was made after the end of Central Plains war and there is nothing to indicate that Yan was opposed to Simpson taking over the Customs House at the time.

The Central Plains War ended with the defeat of the northern coalition when Marshal Zhang who had been neutral until this point came out in support of Chiang on 18 September 1930. The Northern Coalition of warlords found themselves caught as Marshal Zhang advanced south towards Beijing while the National Revolutionary Army advanced north, leading to their rapid defeat. On 1 October 1930, Simpson was shot and badly wounded, and died six weeks later as a result of his wound. On 3 October 1930, Zhang's forces took Tianjin and all of the customs staff appointed by Simpson were fired. Simpson was killed in what some believed to have been an assassination. This was difficult to conclusively prove, because the killers were never caught or identified. It is generally accepted that he was killed by opponents of Yan, and given his reputation as a "louche figure", his actions in seizing control of the Tianjin customs and his subsequent murder did not surprise anyone who had known him. Maze complained about Simpson's murder that "it is deplorable that at the eleventh hour Simpson has been created a sort of a martyr by a handful of Chinese miscreants". Inspector-general Maze put forward three possible reasons for Simpson's murder, namely that he had been killed by Zhang's forces after he threatened to blackmail the "Young Marshal" with information about his lively sex life, that he been killed by Yan's forces after he attempted to make a deal to defect over to Zhang when it became clear that Zhang's forces were going to take Tianjin, and finally that Simpson had been killed in connection with opium smuggling. Maze regarded the last as the least likely as Simpson had openly tolerated opium smuggling during his time as Custom commissioner, making it unlikely that he would had been murdered in connection with the opium trade and felt it most probable his murder was political. Brunero wrote that Simpson was probably killed either by the Kuomintang regime who could not legally try him for his actions or by Yan who was most angry when he learned that Simpson wanted to defect over to his enemies when the northern coalition of warlords was defeated in the war.

== Works ==
His work Indiscreet Letters from Peking is widely cited as an eyewitness account of the events during the siege of the Legations in 1900, but two scholars have cast doubt on its reliability.

A number of his books have recently been republished in facsimile, usually under his pen-name "Putnam Weale". There are free downloads of The Fight for the Republic in China, his best-known work. The Oxford English Dictionary cities his Why China Sees Red as an early example of use of the word term warlord, though The New York Times had used it earlier.

- Manchu and Muscovite (1904)
- The Re-Shaping of the far east (1905)
- Indiscreet Letters from Peking: Being the Notes of an Eye-Witness, Which Set Forth in Some Detail, from Day to Day, the Real Story of the Siege and Sack of a Distressed Capital in 1900—the Year of Great Tribulation. London: G. Bell, 1906.
  - WEALE, B.L. PUTNAM (1907). INDISCREET LETTERS FROM PEKING (YEAR 1919).
  - Weale, B L Putnam (1907). Indiscreet Letters From Peking. Compiled by John Otway Percy Bland, Sir Edmund Backhouse. Dodd Mead And Company.
  - Weale, Bertram Lenox Putnam, ed. (1909). Indiscreet Letters from Peking: Being the Notes of an Eyewitness, which Set Forth in Some Detail, from Day to Day, the Real Story of the Siege and Sack of a Distressed Capital in 1900—the Year of Great Tribulation. Dodd, Mead.
  - WEALE, B.L. PUTNAM, ed. (1922). Indiscreet Letters From Peking (China ed.). Shanghai: Kelly and Walsh, Limited British Empire and Continental Copyright Excepting Scandinavian Countries by Putnam Weale from 1921. Archived from the original on 19 August 2014.
  - WEALE, B.L. PUTNAM, ed. (1922). Indiscreet Letters From Peking Being the Notes of an Eye-Witness, Which Set Forth in Some Detail, from Day to Day, the Real Story of the Siege and Sack of a Distressed Capital in 1900—the Year of Great Tribulation (China ed.). Shanghai: Kelly and Walsh, Limited British Empire and Continental Copyright Excepting Scandinavian Countries by Putnam Weale from 1921.
- The truce in the East and its aftermath (1907)
- The coming struggle in eastern Asia (1909)
- The conflict of color; being a detailed examination of racial examination of racial problems throughout the world with special reference to the English-speaking peoples (1910)
- The Unknown God (1911)
- The fight for the republic in China (1917)
- The truth about China and Japan (1919)
- The Pageant of Peking (1920)
- An indiscreet chronicle from the Pacific (1922)
- Why China Sees Red (1926)
- Chang Tso-Lin's Struggle against the Communist Menace (1927)
- China's crucifixion (1928)
- The Port of Fragrance (1930)[novel]

== Books ==
- Bickers, Robert (1999). Britain in China Community, Culture and Colonialism 1900-1949. Manchester University Press. p. 268.
- Brunero, Donna (2006). Britain's Imperial Cornerstone in China The Chinese Maritime Customs Service, 1854-1949. London: : Taylor & Francis. ISBN 9781134340941.
- Merkel-Hess, Kate (2024). Women and Their Warlords Domesticating Militarism in Modern China. Chicago: University of Chicago Press. ISBN 9780226834313.
- Ven, Hans van de (2014). Breaking with the Past The Maritime Customs Service and the Global Origins of Modernity in China. New York: : Columbia University Press. ISBN 9780231510523.
- Xu, Guoqi (2005). China and the Great War China's Pursuit of a New National Identity and Internationalization. Cambridge: Cambridge University Press. ISBN 9780521842129.
