= Francis Aglen =

British official in Chinese service (1869–1932)

Sir Francis Aglen GCMG KBE
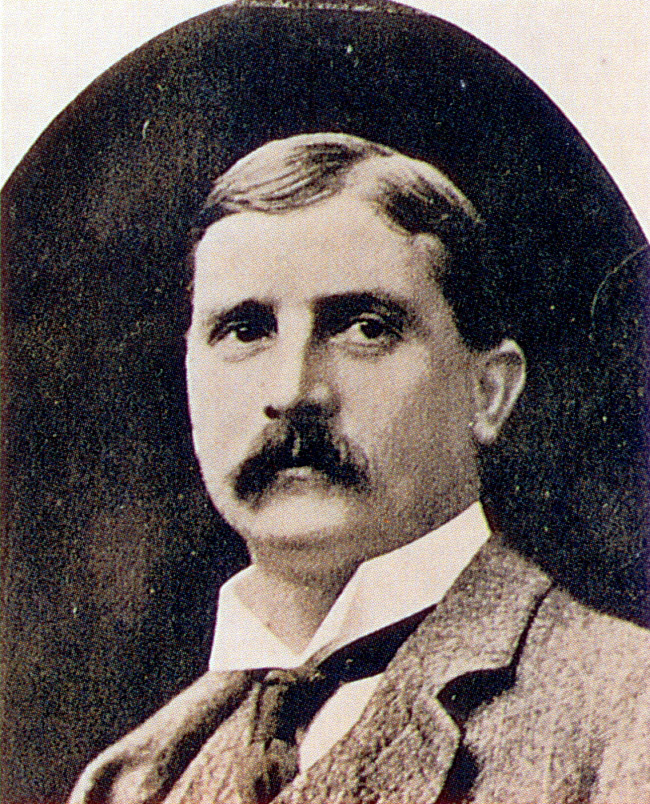

3rd Inspector-General of the Chinese Maritime Customs Service
- In office 25 October 1911 – 31 January 1927
- Preceded by: Sir Robert Bredon (OIG)
- Succeeded by: A. H. F. Edwardes (OIG)

Personal details
- Born: 17 October 1869 Scarborough, Yorkshire, United Kingdom
- Died: 26 May 1932 (aged 62) Meigle, Perthshire, Scotland, United Kingdom
- Spouse(s): Marion Agnes Balfour (1886–1925); Anna Moore Ritchie (1883–1971)
- Occupation: Civil servant

Sir Francis Arthur Aglen GCMG KBE (安格聯; 17 October 1869 – 26 May 1932) was a servant of the Chinese Imperial Customs, later to be the Chinese Maritime Customs, rising through the service to become Inspector-General of the Chinese Maritime Customs Service from 1911 to 1927 after the death of Sir Robert Hart.

== Early years and career ==
Francis Arthur Aglen was born in Scarborough, North Yorkshire, England in 1869, the son of Archdeacon Anthony Stocker Aglen and Margaret Elizabeth Mackenzie, and was educated at Marlborough College in Wiltshire. Joining the Imperial Maritime Customs Service in 1888, Aglen served in many customs postings such as in Beijing, Amoy, Canton and Tianjin. By 1897 he was appointed Deputy Commissioner to the customs tax division, and by 1904 he had become Customs Commissioner and Chief Secretary of Customs in the capital of Beijing, for which he was honoured by the Qing government with the Third Class, First Grade, of the Imperial Order of the Double Dragon.

== Inspector-General of Customs ==
When Sir Robert Hart fell ill in 1908 and returned to Britain, the Chinese government insisted he retain his title of Inspector-General but appointed customs commissioner Sir Robert Bredon to Officiate in Hart's place. When Bredon resigned in June 1910, Aglen served as Officiating Inspector-General from 17 June. When Hart eventually died, Aglen was made full Inspector-General on 25 October 1911. Coming to office not long after the Xinhai Revolution had deposed the Qing dynasty, Aglen found himself heading a Chinese government department for a Republican administration whose influence often did not extend beyond Beijing. Owing to the chaotic situation in China and the threat that instability posed to the security of customs revenues, Aglen sought and was authorised with the power to collect all receipts and supervised the collection of all revenues by an international commission of Bankers in Shanghai.

For his actions to continue the effective operation of the service and the maintenance of China's credit he was honoured by the President of the new 'Beiyang Government', Yuan Shikai, with the Second Class of the Order of the Precious Brilliant Golden Grain in April 1914. In April 1916, Emperor Taishō of Japan awarded him with the First Class of the Order of the Sacred Treasure. While for most of the First World War Aglen banned customs employee from joining military service, as they represented a neutral state, his actions to maintain the position and reputation of the Customs Service gained further recognition and in January 1918 he was made a Knight Commander of the Order of the British Empire (KBE), which had only recently been established. In April 1919 Aglen was awarded by the Norwegian Government the Commander the Order of St. Olav. In May 1920 he was upgraded to the Second Class, with Grand Cordon and Jewels, of the Order of the Precious Brilliant Golden Grain, which was upgraded to the First Class in May 1923 by President Li Yuanhong. In January 1921 the Italian Government made him a Commander of the Order of Saints Maurice and Lazarus.

Despite his success while in office, tensions between Aglen and the internationally recognised Beiyang Government increased as the power of the Kuomintang (KMT) spread north from their base in Guangdong Province. Realising the increasing importance of maintaining good relations with the growing nationalist movement, Aglen arranged to meet Chiang Kai-shek's foreign minister Eugene Chen in January 1927 around the same period that Britain hand handed over their Hankou concession to the KMT. As a consequence the Beiyang government in Beijing took the opportunity to dismiss Aglen as Inspector-General, an act that provoked immediate protest from the British government. On his dismissal Aglen was awarded by the British government with the Knight Grand Cross of the Order of St Michael and St George (GCMG), and subsequently with the Grand Cross of the Order of Leopold II from Belgium and the Grand Cordon of the Order of the Rising Sun by Japan.

== Family and later years ==
In 1906 Aglen married Isobel Marion Agnes "Senga" Bayley Balfour (born. 1886), the daughter of Professor Sir Isaac Bayley Balfour, professor of Botany and regius keeper of the Royal Botanic Garden, Edinburgh, and had three sons and two daughters, all born during his service in Beijing: Edward Francis (1907–1993), Anthony John (1911–1984), Marion Agnes (1912–2000), Elizabeth Senga (1915–1997) and George Balfour (1924–2004). The first Lady Aglen fell ill in early 1925 and Aglen took leave in order to accompany her with their newborn son George back to Britain in the hope that the climate would improve her health, leaving Hong Kong on board the Blue Funnel steamer SS Antenor on 7 April; however on 17 April, between Colombo and Singapore, she died at sea.

On 2 July 1927 Aglen married to Anna Moore Ritchie (1883–1971) a widow. Living in retirement in Alyth in Scotland, Aglen died aged 62 at Meigle Hospital, Meigle, Perthshire, on 26 May 1932, survived by his second wife and children from his first marriage. His second son, Anthony John Aglen, was born in Beijing on 30 May 1911 and later rose to become a prominent British civil servant based in the Scotland Office and was awarded the Companion of the Order of the Bath (CB) in 1957 and a Fellowship of the Royal Society of Edinburgh in 1963.

Government offices
| Preceded by | Commissioner of Customs in Nanking; 1901–1904 | Succeeded by |
| Preceded by E.T. Pym | Commissioner of Customs in Hankou; 1906–1910; Served alongside: A.H. Sugden | Succeeded by F.A. Carl |
| Preceded by Sir Robert Bredon as Officiating Inspector-General | Officiating Inspector-General of the Imperial Maritime Customs Service; 1910–1911 | Appointed as full Inspector-General |
| Preceded by Himself as Officiating Inspector-General | Inspector-General of the Chinese Maritime Customs Service; 1911–1927 | Succeeded by Arthur Henry Francis Edwardes as Officiating Inspector-General |
