= Battle of Muddy Flat =

American/British battle in Shanghai

- Part of Taiping Rebellion
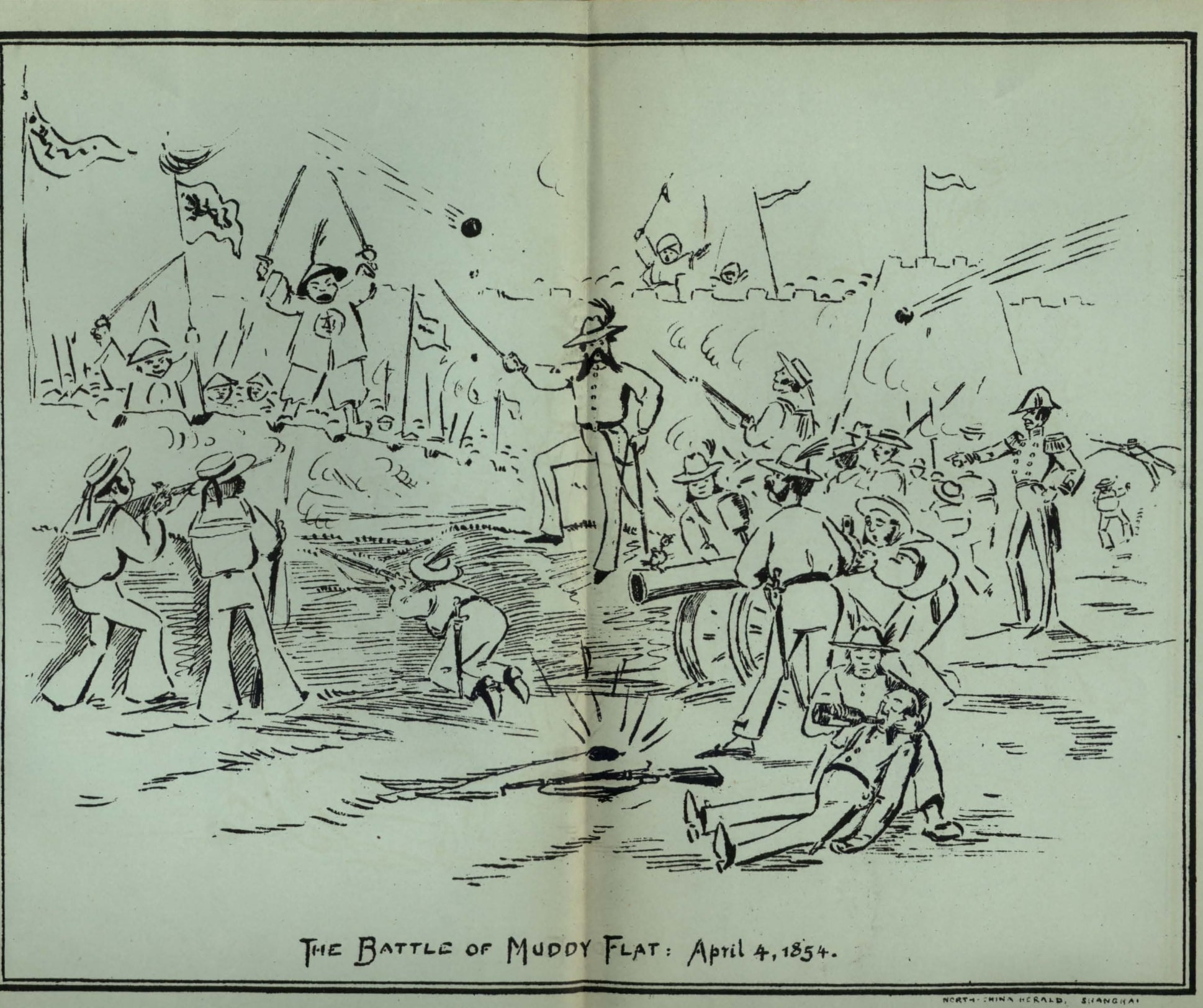
- British and American attack during the Battle of Muddy Flat, Shanghai, China, 1854
Date	April 3–4, 1854
Location	Shanghai, China
Result	Anglo-American-Rebel victory: Qing forces retreat a mile away from the foreign concessions area; Adherence to foreign extraterritoriality status maintained; Yangtze Patrol, Shanghai Municipal Council, Shanghai Municipal Police, and the Chinese Maritime Customs Service established

Belligerents
United Kingdom; United States; Shanghai Volunteer Corps; Taiping Heavenly Kingdom (Small Swords Society)	Qing dynasty (A-Pak pirate mercenary fleet)

Commanders and leaders
(United Kingdom) Rutherford Alcock (United States) Robert C. Murphy (United States Navy) Captain John Kelly (United Kingdom) Captain O'Callaghan; Liu Lichuan	(China) Keih-ur-hanga; A-Pak

Strength
Land: ~200 British marines and sailors ~75 American marines and sailors ~75 Shanghai volunteers ~30 American merchant sailors ~Unknown number of British merchant sailors ~Unknown number of British and American police ~3 artillery pieces ~3,000–4,000 Small Sword soldiers Sea: ~2 British sloops of war ~1 American sloop of war Total: 380–400 foreign fighters, 3,000–4,000 Small Sword soldiers, 3 artillery pieces, and 3 sloops of war	Land: ~10,000–30,000 Qing soldiers Sea: ~At least 8 pirate junks

Casualties and losses
British: 1 dead American: 1 dead S.V.C.: 2 dead Combined injured: 14	Qing: At least 30 killed and 2 captured inside the camp Unknown casualties inside the camps (likely high) Pirates: Unknown

The Battle of Muddy Flat, also called the Battle of Nicheng (泥城之戰) by the Chinese, was a small land/naval battle on the borders of the Shanghai Concession areas of what would later become the Shanghai International Settlement between a British, American, and Small Swords Society alliance and units of the Qing Imperial forces with a fleet of mercenary allies on April 3–4, 1854. The battle took place during the Small Swords Society uprising, which was part of the Taiping Rebellion, but before the Second Opium War. Qing forces began harassing foreigners around the foreign concessions in part due to individual foreigners trading with Taiping forces, who had just taken over the Old City of Shanghai the previous year. Skirmishes began on April 3 and the defending Shanghai Volunteer Corps "S.V.C." called for more direct military aid. An amphibious landing by U.S. and British Marines and Sailors took place the next day, and the battle began soon after, resulting in a joint Anglo-American victory. The battle is significant in solidifying the military ability and determination of foreigners to maintain their power in their concessions in the eyes of both the Taiping and the Qing. The battle also marked the first time that American and British military forces worked together in a land battle, as opposed to their joint 1800 naval battle in Curaçao during the Quasi War and War of the Second Coalition.

== Background ==
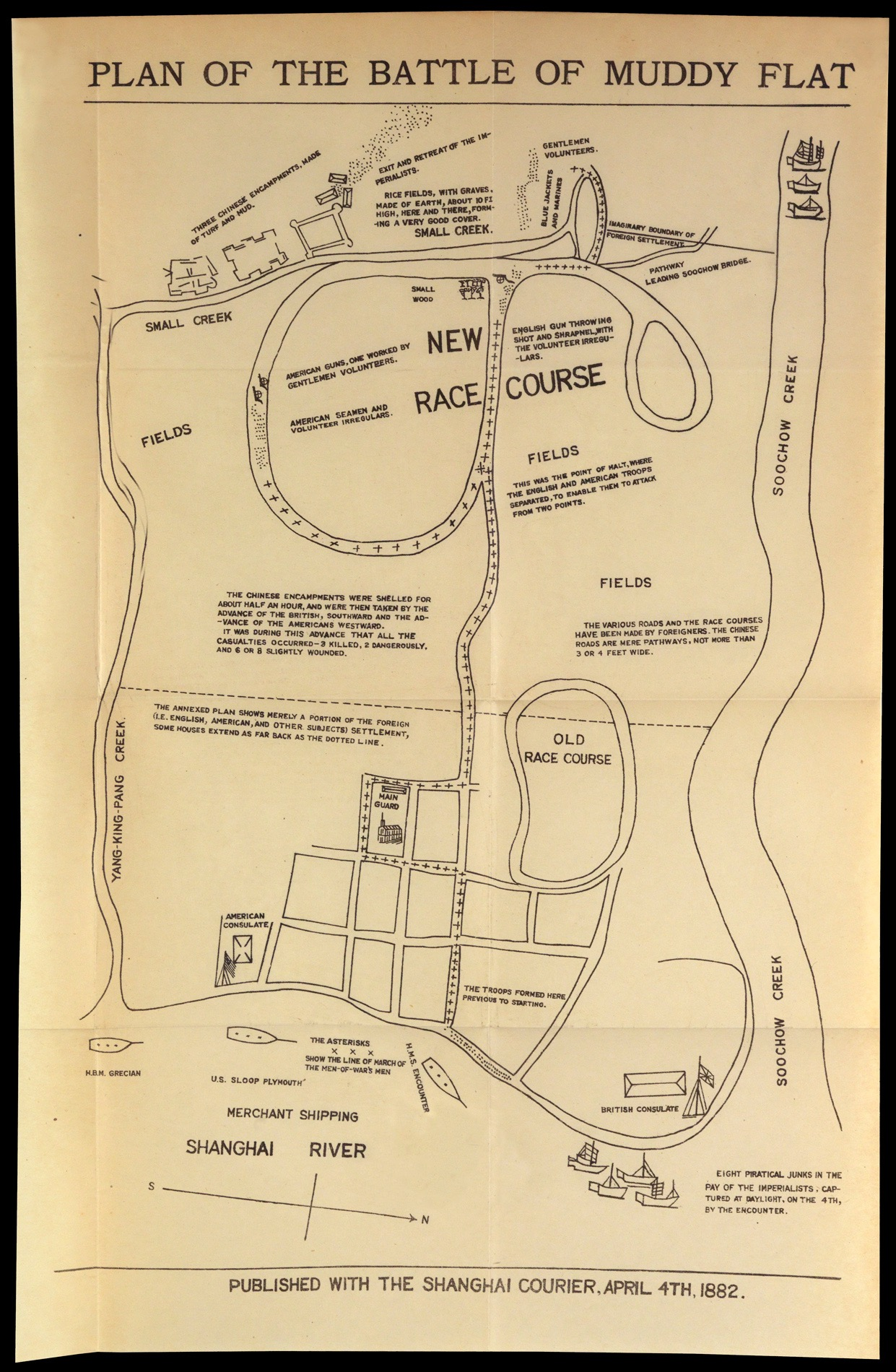
Map of the Battle from the Shore View. (Note the French Concession and fortified Old City of Shanghai is unseen, but are on the South side of the Yang-Pang River.)

On March 19, 1853, the Taiping army had decisively won the Battle of Nanjing (1853). Tens of thousands of Manchu men, women, and children were slaughtered, and Nanjing was made the capital of the Taiping Heavenly Kingdom. However, the Taiping military rapidly regrouped for a new campaign and advanced East along the Yangtze river, taking over the cities of Chinkiang and Yangzhou, as a maneuver of the wider Northern Expedition. Inspired by the success of the fall of Nanjing, a man named Huang Wei led the Tiandihui, Triad, Small Swords Society in a revolt that briefly took over Ch'eng-hai, Amoy, T'ung-an, and Changzhou, before swiftly being put down by the Qing. However, the influence this uprising had inspired the Small Swords to quickly regroup for an attempt on Shanghai and its surroundings. The Shanghai Taotai Wu Jianzhang, being fearful of the advancing Small Swords, assembled a throng of dockworkers and vagrants to defend the city. When the Small Swords advance stalled, Wu disbanded the militia to save funds. Wu's disbanding left the militia dissatisfied and unemployed and as such they, began joining the Small Swords society with the newly elected Liu Lichuan as their leader. Realizing his mistake in August, Wu began arresting leaders of the militia who had joined the Small Swords and attempted to reform and organize the militia to satisfy them. However, this act proved too little too late, and on September 17, 1853, the now bolstered Small Swords captured the fortified and walled Old City of Shanghai, looted it, killed the magistrate, and captured Wu. This left the concession area surrounded on one side by the Small Swords to the South and Qing dynasty forces to the West. In addition, many refugees fled to the foreign concessions. Following Old Shanghai's capture, the Qing immediately began laying siege to the Old City, and created various trenches, parapets, and mud forts to surround and encircle it. The Qing headquarters was stationed at the Red Joss house to the north of the Wusung. Skirmishes occurred between the Swords and Qing progressively as the siege continued.

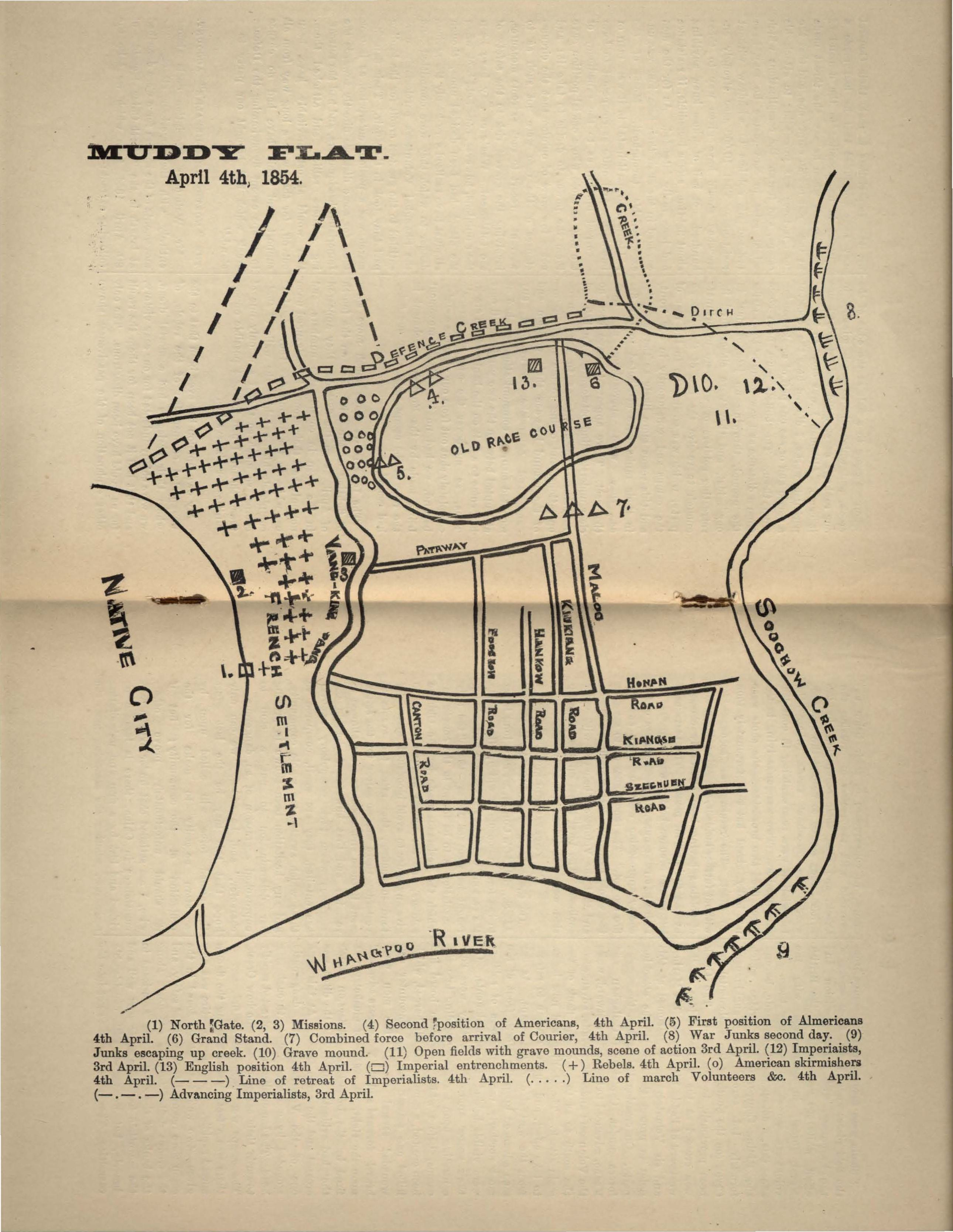

Later, the Qing hired the pirate Mandarin A-Pak (sometimes spelled Ah Pak) and his fleet of war junks to bolster their forces. They arrived on the Wusung and Whangpoo rivers in early 1854, and periodically bombarded the Old City, which further tightened the overall siege. For their part, the Americans and British living in the concessions area were ever fearful of the Taiping incursion. After the fall of Nanking in 1853 Sir George Bonham, the British Superintendent for all China, realized the potential danger of Shanghai falling to Taiping forces, and in response called for a volunteer force to be created in Shanghai. The British Consul in Shanghai Rutherford Alcock called for a meeting and it was decided that a volunteer force should be led and trained by Captain Tronson of the 2nd Fusiliers Bengal Regiment and the HMS Bombay, would supply the force with weapons. The American Consul Robert C. Murphy had a similar meeting and likewise concluded that a volunteer force should be mustered. The American and British consuls soon met and created a committee of cooperation for mutual defense to combine their forces into what became the Shanghai Volunteer Corps. Captain Tronson drilled the volunteers in military discipline three times a week for two months, before being reassigned. Captain John Kelly of the sloop of war USS Plymouth having been left behind by the Perry expedition to defend Shanghai, then took command of the S.V.C. Aside from a small skirmish between the Qing and Volunteers in November 1853, the Volunteers would not see action until April 1854.

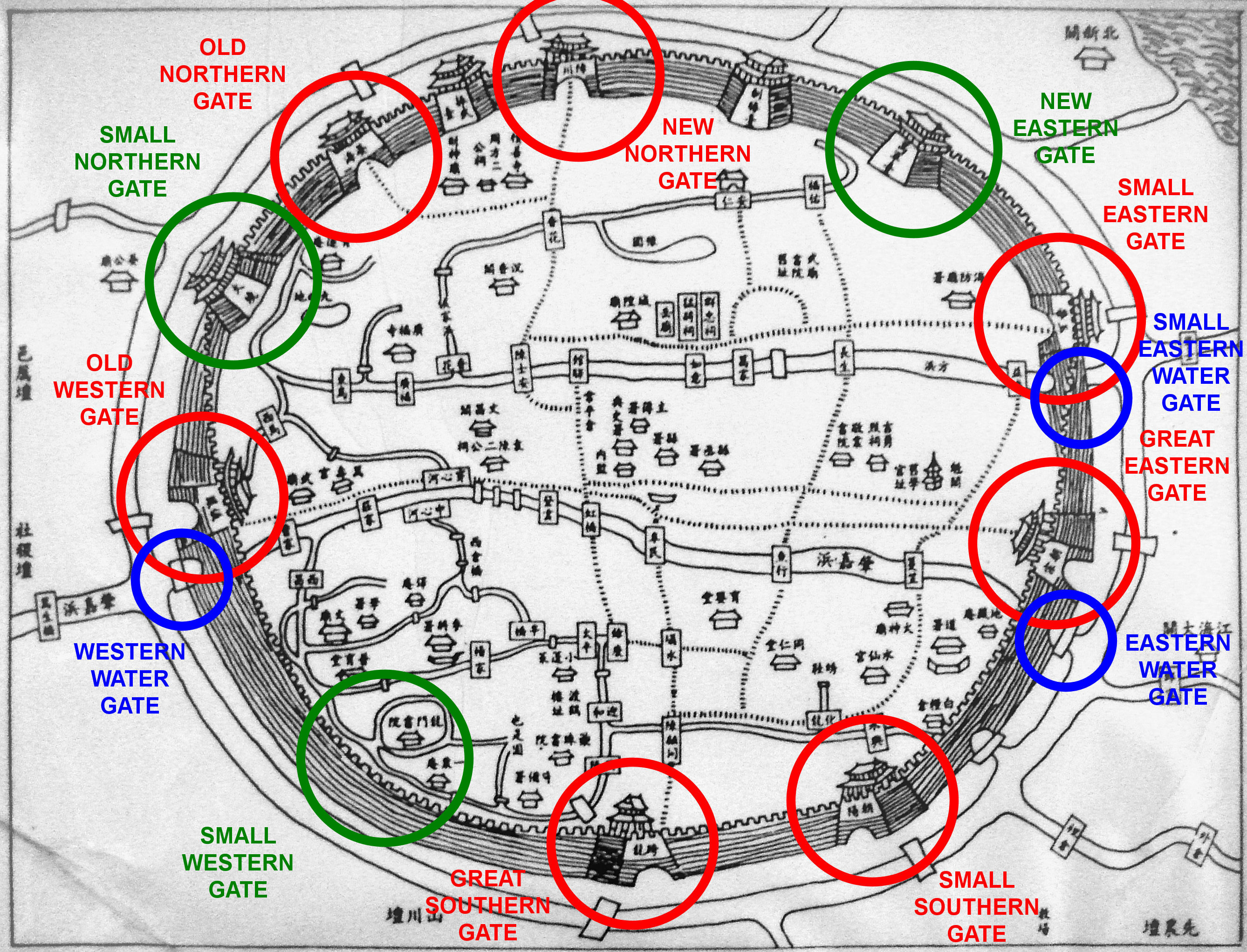
Map of the fortified Old City of Shanghai

On April 12, 1853, a meeting between the British, French, Dutch, Prussian, and American consuls took place, where a Mr. A. G. Dallas suggested that a defensive creek be constructed around the West end of the concession area, where Qing forces had fortified. This defensive creek would be connected to the Wusung River to the North, and the Yang-king-pang River to the South (the latter of which no longer exists), which were both tributaries of the Whangpoo River to the East. Connecting all three rivers with the Creek would in effect create a moat around the concessions. The Creek was constructed and it came to be called the Defensive Creek. The new creek was located just above the concession area's new race course. By April 1854 the Small Swords were surrounded, but never entirely encircled by the Qing. However, while the Qing, Small Swords, and foreigners all decided to stay neutral, certain merchants within the concessions sold weapons and supplies to the Small Swords which aggravated the Qing who occasionally fired potshots at foreigners. There was one particular such incident of note, where in March 1854 the Qing obtained intelligence that a British Company was going to deliver a shipment of guns to the Small Swords. In response the Qing sent a raiding party into the concession area to the customs house where they captured the guns. They were carrying them out when men of the HMS Spartan and the S.V.C. attacked them. The Qing soldiers retreated losing 3 men and 14 wounded. The Qing pinned the raid on the Small Swords.

== Battle ==
On April 3, 1854, the initial fight of the battle of Muddy Flat began. On this day there were a series of four separate attacks on foreign civilians by Qing forces. The first of these occurred when a handful Qing forces ventured to commandeer construction wood from some merchants. One merchant who was present in the area bade them to desist, however he was rushed upon by them, and the merchant was forced to fire his gun in response. A second attack came about when a number of Qing forces attacked a horseback rider who fled the area. A later attack occurred when a man was shot at a few paces away from his door. The final attack followed when a group of Qing soldiers attacked a couple armed with swords, spears, and firearms as they were walking along the new park along Defensive Creek. British and American police arrived at the scene, but found the area crawling with the Qing soldiers who instantly fired upon them, and mustered reinforcements to press the attack. The police fell back and called for reinforcements. Captain Kelly accompanied by a handful of American Marines and sailors was already in Shanghai at the time, and took overall command of the forces. The British Vice Consul and former Lieutenant Thomas Francis Wade joined Kelly and took command of a group of British Marines and Sailors. The collective group secured two field pieces and one 12-pound howitzer. Now reinforced and bearing more firepower, the Marines, Sailors, police, and (S.V.C.) counterattacked across the defensive creek and sacked and burned one of the Qing camps while the allied navy bombarded a second. The allied ground forces then withdrew to the concessions.Later that day 4th British Consul Alcock protested these attacks to the Qing general Keih-ur-hanga (sometimes spelled Chi-erh hang-a). Keih gave a vague dismissive response.

The next day, April 4, Alcock again called for Keih to halt the attack, but this time gave an ultimatum that if the Imperial forces would not retreat a mile away from the borders of the concessions area by 4 pm, then the foreigners would attack. However, on this occasion, the general threatened Alcock and said that the men who had attacked the concessions were simply local vagrants, but to be weary of them, because they numbered 20,000 and any further attack on them would result in repercussions.The Qing had an approximate 10,000 extra soldiers on reserve in the surrounding areas of Shanghai, but it was only about 10,000 of the total 30,000 that the foreigners would actually engage.

Alcock made arrangements with the Small Swords to participate in the attack with the foreigners at 4 pm, should the Qing not retreat from their positions, of which there were about 3,000-4,000 in the Old City. He used the merchants who supplied the Small Swords as middlemen to communicate with the Small Swords.

Before 3 pm, the sloop of war HMS Encounter, led by Captain O'Callaghan, deployed armed boats to attack the pirate junks docked along the Wusung and Whampu rivers. O'Callaghan followed up with a broadside, and most of the surviving junks fled from the Whampu into the South China Sea, which prevented most of the ships from further participation in the battle.

At this point there remained a modest handful of resident militia along with four or five British marines who came under fire from Qing forces along the Defense Creek near a graveyard in the Southwest corner of the concessions area near where the Defense Creek and Yang-king-pang River meet. These men took cover and returned fire as best as they could behind a large circular grave, near the new race course. The Imperial forces advanced and the foreign fighters were under severe threat of being overwhelmed.

At 3 pm the HMS Encounter, HMS Grecian, and USS Plymouth all landed Marines and Sailors of their respective countries. There were more or less 200 British and Marines, 75 American Soldiers and Marines, 75 SVC, 30 American Merchant Sailors, an unknown amount of British Merchant Sailors, and a handful of American and British police. In total there were roughly between 380 and 400 allied forces. Captain O'Callaghan led the British along with Lieutenant Rodrick Dew and Consul Alcock, Thomas Francis Wade took command of the CVS, and Captain Kelly took charge of the Americans with the support of Lieutenant John Wade and Consul Murphy. The troop rolled out the artillery, and marched under flags to the beat of drums from the shores of the Whampu across the Maloo road to the frontlines. The reinforcements arrived on the outskirts of the new race track where the defenders were holding out at about 3:30 pm. The artillery pieces were put in place and held fire, while the British and American forces split in two. O'Callaghan and the British continued straight along the Maloo road going through the race course, and the Americans marched left moving along the slopping path of the new race track to the South and then West to come in behind and release the pressure of the defenders behind the circular grave. Meanwhile, the British flanked left moving southbound to attack the Qing from the side. Then at precisely 4 pm the three artillery pieces opened up their salvos, and the British and Americans fired in unison. Moments later the Small Swords rushed into the fray and advanced into the Qing lines. Excited by seeing the Qing falter the Americans charged into the Qing up until they got to the edge of the Defense Creek, with a seven-foot mud wall in front of it before halting. The Qing gave a retreating fire over the wall at the Americans, who suffered a few casualties, before taking cover among the graves mounds, until the Qing retreated. At the same time the British crossed a bridge to the gates of one of the Qing camp. They suffered casualties from an enemy cannon and subsequent musket volley. Despite their losses, the British charged beyond the outer gate and into the enemy camps and proceeded to burn and loot them. Fire spread quickly as the winds blew heavily causing the fire to spread. The Americans fell back to cover the British rear along the Wusung. The Small Swords continued their attack and the artillery continued the barrage for around half an hour. The Qing retreated on all sides and the Qing took over the outlying positions and fortifications surrounding the concessions area. Two remaining pirate junks on the Wusung took two partying broadsides, but missed and retreated permanently into the Whampou, and the foreign victory secured. By about 6 pm the fighting had stopped.

The foreign casualties included one American, one British and two Volunteers dead, and 15-16 others injured. There were many casualties on the Qing side with at least 30 Dead Qing inside the camps, many more outside. Inside the camps Eight battalions of Qing soldiers defeated, with an untold number of casualties. Two injured Qing soldiers were captured by the British. Some of the American casualties may have been from friendly fire by the British as they shot Qing from the North aiming South.

== Aftermath ==
The following day April 5 the foreigners destroyed some outlying camps that the Small Swords had not occupied and leveled them to the sea. Keih apologized to the consuls for the assaults on the concessions, he again claimed that the attacks were by criminals outside of his control. Tensions with the Qing dynasty eased after this. Keih entreated the foreigners to advise the Small Swords to leave their positions that they had captured during the battle and return to the Old City. The foreigners requested the Small Swords to vacate the areas, and hoping to win the foreigners good graces, they did so. It was agreed by the foreigners and the Qing that the foreign concessions would continue to take a position of strict neutrality, but ban any military trade with either side of the ongoing civil war. Likewise, it was also agreed that a wall should be created along the entire perimeter of the foreign concessions for the protections of the foreigners and to keep smugglers from getting out. Both the Qing and the Small Swords consented to keep their men out of the concessions and the Small Swords posted signs throughout the Old city forbidding such trespasses. However, while the agreement protected all the concessions from incursion, it made an exception in that it did not prevent the Small Swords from entering the French Concession through the South bank of the Yang-king-pang.

After seeing the wisdom of a mutual cooperation and organization during the battle of Muddy Flat, the concessions decided to form the Shanghai Municipal Council On July 11, 1854. At first the council focused on infrastructure, trade, regulate refugees, and taxes within the concessions, but gradually it move on to mutual defense and the Shanghai Municipal Police were created in September of that year. Likewise with the help of the Qing the foreigners established the Chinese Maritime Customs Service to regulate the Chinese harbors and lighthouse, and to manage foreign loans and tariffs. Moreover, following the Battle of Muddy Flat the United States worked with its Concession allies to form the Yangtze River Patrols, whereby the United States and its allies would sale up and down the Chinese coasts and rivers in order to provide mutual protect for the various treaty ports, businesses, and Christian missions.

However, troubles continued in the concessions area. The agreements made between the Qing and the foreigners did not stop Keih from building barricades around the concessions in order to thwart a potential Small Swords advance. In turn the Small Swords built a mud fort just outside the French concession to fire at the Qing. From there the Qing and Small Swords would periodically fire upon each other and the French Concession got caught in the crossfire. Taking exception to this, the French informed the Small Swords that they were going to dismantle the fort. The French fulfilled their commitment and sent men to begin dismantling the fort. Soon after, both sides began firing on each other. The FS Colbert opened fire on the old city's Little East Gate and the French Fleet Commander Laguerre declared war on December 14, 1854, and joined the Qing in their siege of the Old City. The French attacked again on January 6, 1855, and targeted and destroyed the Old City's North gate with the combined might of 250 French Marines and 1,500 Qing soldiers. The French withdrew and the Qing attacked again on February 16, 1855, with the support of French artillery. The next day February 17, Old Shanghai fell to the Qing and French and Liu Lichuan died which brought the Small Swords Uprising to an end. The surviving Small Swords retreated and were absorbed into other Taiping armies. The Qing rewarded the French with silk, silver, and an expansion of their concession in Shanghai. Shanghai would not be attacked again during the Taiping Rebellion until Taiping forces attacked twice more on August 19, 1860, and again in the Battle of Shanghai in 1861.

=== Other instances of U.S. Involvement in the Taiping Rebellion ===
There was at least one other case where the United States participated in the Taiping Rebellion. In May 1854 the North Pacific Exploring and Surveying Expedition, had dispatched the USS John Hancock, to Hong Kong. Her mission was to conduct hydrographic surveys among the Islands Southeast Asia, while using Hong Kong as a base. In addition to conducting surveys, the John Hancock was instructed to conduct coastal and river patrols similar to the Yangtze patrol in order to protect foreigners from pirates and Tai Ping rebels. At one point during the Summer, the John Hancock was patrolling the Canton River, with two of her armed patrol boats. Tai Ping rebel batteries began firing on the boats, and the boats returned fire and destroyed them. Combined with the battle of Muddy Flat this small skirmish shows that the United States briefly fought limited defensive engagements with both Taping forces and Qing forces during the Taping rebellion.

== Historical assessment ==
According to several participants and foreign witness the most grievous of the assaults, that spurred the counterattack occurred when the couple was set upon by Qing forces, the man was grievously hurt, but not mortally injured and the woman terrified. The anger over the attack of the couple may have been the major catalyst for a perhaps rash decision to counterstrike, where diplomacy may have been the better opinion. Though others would contend that had an example not have been made of foreign resolve than the rights of foreigners would have been trodden upon.

It was the opinion of some of the foreign participants that the easy victory may have had more to do with the Small Swords intervention than foreign tactics. After the British and Americans split in two on the race track there was a general lack of communication between the two groups. There were no mounted horsemen on the foreign side that could deliver messages, and the parapet wall gave little visibility to the Americans as to the position of the British while they burned the camps. Moreover, the SVC and militia volunteers were collectively green and undertrained compared to the Marines and Blue Jackets of the American and British military participants. A wider counterattack by the Qing may have proved disastrous or even crippling for the foreigners who were moreover greatly outnumbered. It is estimated that the Qing had anywhere from 10,000 to 20,000 fighters, possibly as many as 30,000 if you counted the surrounding occupied areas around Shanghai from which the Qing could have pulled from. And if the Qing did counterattack at some point the distance between the American and British forces from when they split off could have easily exposed the Americans in particular to be out flanked and at best driven into the defense creek.

It may also be that General Keih feared a wider conflict after seeing the seriousness of the foreign resolve. It is possible that he considered that whether or not he won the battle, if he angered the foreigners too much or inflicted enough foreign casualties on the concessions, then the governments of the foreign powers might take further military action against the Qing dynasty. Seeing the foreigners attack directly may have convinced Keih that making friends with the foreigners for the sake of peace, was more beneficial to the Qing cause than challenging them. It is asserted that Keih likely made the decision to retreat more for the sake of getting entangled in a wider conflict beyond the Taiping threat, and less to do with the Small Swords coming to the aid of the foreigners, though this was undoubtedly a contributing factor.

By itself, the battle of Muddy Flat played a great role in foreigners seeing the wisdom of mutual cooperation in China and to varying degrees the Qing government, and helped lead to the creations of the Shanghai Municipal Council, the Shanghai Municipal Police, the Chinese Maritime Customs Service, the Yangtze Patrol, and the eventual 1863 merging of many of the Shanghai's foreign concessions except France into the Shanghai International Settlement. The Battle also set the precedent for the U.S. and the U.K. to support each other in various Pacific conflicts in the future, including the Second Opium War where the United States gave support to the British five years later in the Battle of Taku Forts (1859).

Collectively, both the Battle of Muddy Flat and the later French participation in the Siege of the Old City of Shanghai ushered in the beginning of foreign intervention in the Taiping Rebellion. Likewise, the military success of the foreigners, expanded the de jure varied territorial and extra territorial authority they enjoyed, to a relative de facto authority to all past and future Unequal treaties in the eyes of the Chinese. This phenomenon continued till the return of most concessions after world war II, and later the handovers of Macau and Hong Kong.

=== Origin of the battle's name ===
There are differing accounts of how the Battle of Muddy Flat got its name. Participants of the battle say there was no rain and the ground was dry, so there was no flat/mudflat to trod upon. However, there is a story that one of the American sailors who ran up to the Defense Creek during Captain Kelly's charge may have gotten a muddy foot on the edge of the Defense Creek. A misprint in a local news paper changed the name from "Battle of Muddy Foot" to "Battle of Muddy Flat". However some scholars think this story is more legend than fact. Another theory is that the name gets its origin from one of the various mud wall parapets that the Qing made along the concessions area. They were made of mud and turf and were flat, hence the name "Muddy Flat". Similarly there is speculation that Muddy Flat refers to the Chinese encampments themselves which used turf and mud in their construction. One hypothesis postulates that the name may originate from the Defense Creek as the Chinese referred to the Creek and the area around it as "Mud City", "Mud City Beach" and "Mud City Bridge" transliterated as "Nicheng", "Nichengbang" and "Nichengqiao" (no relation to the current Nicheng "Mud Town" in modern Southeastern Shanghai). A final theory suggests that the name of the battle gets its origin from the new race course.

== See also ==
- Pirates of the South China Coast
- Battle of Ty-ho Bay
- Ningpo massacre
- Battle of the Barrier Forts
- Century of humiliation
- Old China Trade
- China Marines
- Gunboat diplomacy
- East India Squadron
- Treaty of Wanghia
- Treaty of Nanking
- United States Asiatic Fleet
- Extraterritoriality#China
- Russell & Company#Shanghai Steam Navigation Company (1846–1877)
