= Volunteer Defence Corps =

Volunteer Defence Corps may refer to:

- Volunteer Defence Corps in Australia
- Volunteer Defense Corps in Thailand
- Hong Kong Volunteer Defence Corps, last named the Royal Hong Kong Regiment
- Shanghai Volunteer Corps
