= Shanghai Allied War Memorial =

Chinese memorial

- European War Victory Memorial (欧战胜利纪念); Angel of Peace (和平女神像)
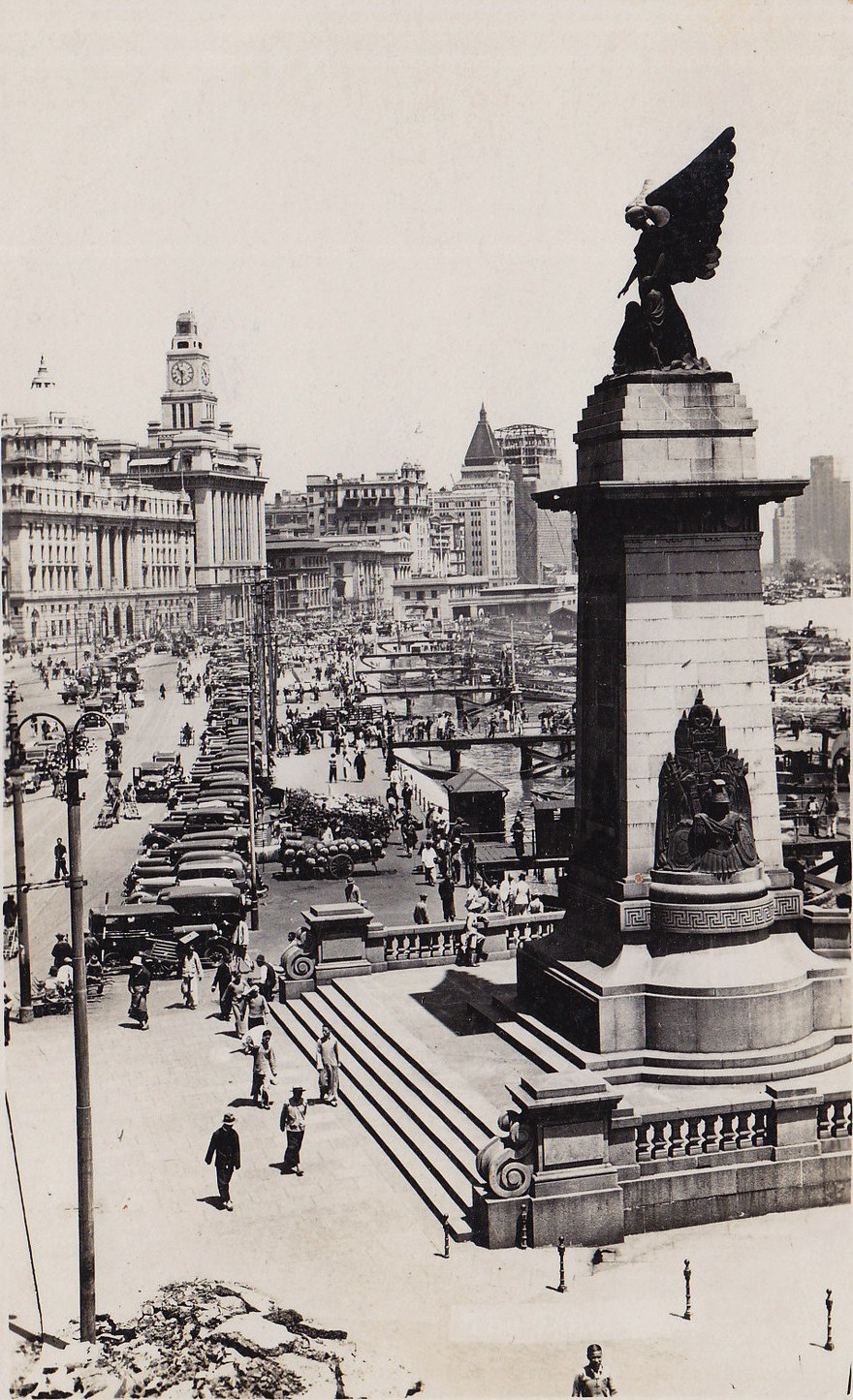
- The memorial in c. 1935
- Interactive map of Shanghai Allied War Memorial
- Coordinates: 31°14′08.3″N 121°29′15.9″E
- Designer: Stewardson & Spence; Henry Charles Fehr; Isabella Karnitsky
- Material: Bronze, granite
- Dedicated date: 19 February 1924
- Dismantled date: 1943 (statuary), 1960 (plinth)

The Shanghai Allied War Memorial, also called the Angel of Peace, was a war memorial on the Bund in Shanghai, China. It was unveiled in 1924 to commemorate the over 200 (mostly British) residents of the Shanghai International Settlement and French Concession who died in the service of the Allies in the First World War. The memorial was mostly dismantled in 1943, during the Japanese occupation of the city, and its empty plinth was destroyed in 1960.

== Background ==
After the foundation of the Shanghai International Settlement in 1863, the city's European residents erected a number of monuments commemorating Europeans in China and those who assisted them. The first such monument on the Bund was a small obelisk dedicated to the anti-Taiping Ever Victorious Army, erected in 1866. The North China Herald labeled it an "utterly unworthy erection." This was followed in 1880 by a more substantial and stylistically accomplished monument to Augustus Raymond Margary, which took the form of a gothic stone spire inspired by the Albert Memorial in London. Further sculptural additions to the Bund included a bronze statue of Sir Harry Parkes (1890), a memorial to the sunken German cruiser SMS Iltis (1896, destroyed 1918) which incorporated the ship's broken mast, and a bronze statue of Sir Robert Hart (1914).

Hundreds of British and French Shanghai residents departed to Europe in order to serve in the First World War, with the first large group departing from the Bund in October 1914. Smaller numbers of Germans departed from Shanghai and Qingdao, although they were not memorialized in Shanghai. The Shanghai-based British businessman Arthur L. Anderson lobbied for a memorial commemorating the Allied soldiers who fell in the war as early as 1916, and the municipal councils reserved a location for the memorial (at the end of Avenue Edward VII, which marked the boundary between the International Settlement and the French Concession) in 1917.

The Allied victory was widely celebrated in Shanghai, and enthusiasm for the memorial, which, according to the president of the Shanghai Club, was to signify a future where "the wisdom of the Council Chamber will be the final arbiter, not the sword", grew. A committee was established in April 1919, with the aim that the memorial be built by the citizens of Shanghai, instead of the resident diplomatic missions. The committee members comprised a diverse cross-section of Shanghai's European and Chinese elite.

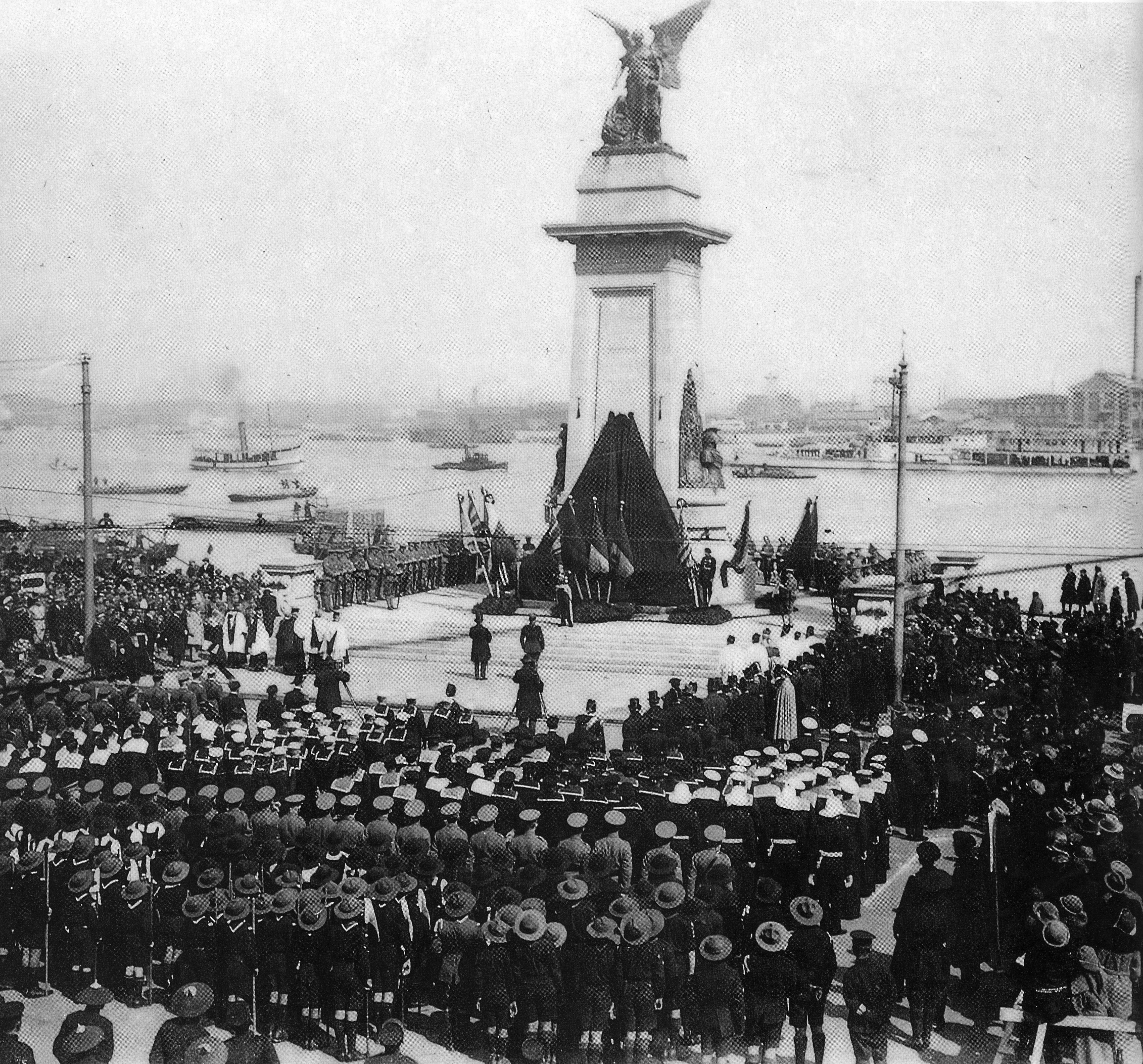
The memorial's unveiling ceremony

Proposals for the memorial included a set of Chinese gates and a reproduction of the newly-erected Cenotaph in London, but committee members objected to a "mundane" design. After a competition, the committee selected a proposal by the Shanghai firm of Stewardson & Spence in May 1920. The firm's design was a classic memorial, with a tall, trophy-decorated pedestal supporting a bronze group showing the goddess of victory extending her hand over a war widow and orphan. Henry Charles Fehr, who was known for his memorial sculptures, was selected to produce the sculptural group. The memorial's budget was raised through a fundraising campaign, major donors to which included European and Chinese businessmen and the Shanghai Race Club.

== History ==
Construction of the memorial was plagued by delays and cost overruns, and during its construction, several smaller private war memorials were unveiled in Shanghai schools, clubs, and churches. It was completed in January 1924, and unveiled with great fanfare on 16 February. Speakers at the unveiling included members of the committee, the consuls of Allied countries in Shanghai, and Catholic and Protestant clerics. The Shanghai Volunteer Corps and French Corps participated, and HMS Diomede fired a salute followed by a parade.

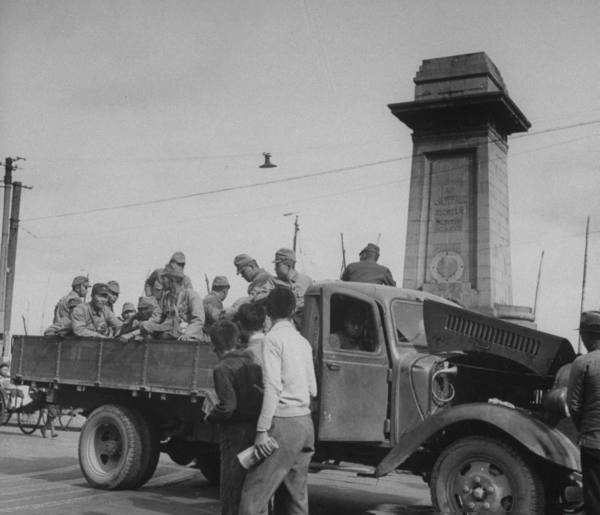
The memorial without its bronze fittings in 1945

The memorial became the site of frequent ceremonies, including commemorations of battles, national holidays, and saints' days. Armistice Day was celebrated with particular solemnity. When not in use for solemn purposes, the memorial site functioned as a public space. Europeans complained that its Huangpu-facing north side was being used as a latrine by locals, and jurisdictional confusion (the memorial was sited between the International and French concessions, and initially patrolled by the police forces of neither) hindered its maintenance as a place of solemnity.

Chinese Shanghai fell to the Imperial Japanese Army following the battle of Shanghai in 1937, and the International Settlement fell under Japanese control following the attack on Pearl Harbor in 1941 (the French Concession remained under "precarious" Vichy governance). The Japanese cancelled the annual Armistice Day celebration in 1942. Shanghai's "Treaty Port Era" ended a year later, with the transfer of the French Concession to the Wang Jingwei government. Soon after, the memorial's bronze fittings (along with most of the other European-erected memorials in Shanghai) were scrapped, and plans for a pro-Chinese memorial on the pedestal were drafted. The Japanese surrender in 1945 ended this plan. While parts of the scrapped statue were rediscovered at a dump in 1947, they were not reinstalled, although hundreds of veterans gathered there for Armistice Day that year. The new Shanghai government under Wu Guozhen made plans to reuse the pedestal as a memorial for the victims of the Second World War, which were not implemented.

The communists took Shanghai in May 1949, conclusively ending use of the memorial site for its original use. It became derelict, and was demolished over the course of several weeks in 1960. Although no concrete plans were ever made for the reuse of the memorial by communist authorities, a print celebrating the communist takeover of Shanghai from 1950 shows the plinth supporting a statue of a communist volunteer.

== Design and legacy ==
The memorial was a tall plinth topped by the statue of the goddess of victory extending her hand over a widow and orphan (colloquially called the "Angel of Peace"). The statue was similar to other memorials by Fehr, who was known for his depictions of winged victory. The plinth was adorned with bronze reliefs sculpted by Isabella Karsnitsky. At the plinth's base, there was an honor roll which listed the names of the 235 Shanghai residents who died in Allied service during the war; most of these were British and 25 were French. Two trophies of arms flanked the memorial's north and south sides, and the inscription AD MORTUORUM GLORIAM MCMXIV MCMXVII ("To the Glory of the Dead 1914–1918") was inscribed on its front above an oversize palm frond and wreath.

The "Angel of Peace" statue became an icon of the Bund, frequently framing photographs of it. It was featured in a number of films, artworks, and writings, most notably making an appearance in the 1937 film Street Angel. Chinese viewers of the statue came to view it beyond its originally narrow purpose, and it was invoked as a symbol of peace in China writ large in artwork and costume.

A smaller-scale replica of the statue stands in the 1930s-themed Shanghai Film Park, owned by the Shanghai Film Studio.

== See also ==
- Shanghai People's Heroes Memorial Tower, a 1993 monument dedicated to Communist martyrs near the former site of the Allied War Memorial
