= Mangelia concinna =

Scientific classification
- Kingdom: Animalia
- Phylum: Mollusca
- Class: Gastropoda
- Subclass: Caenogastropoda
- Order: Neogastropoda
- Superfamily: Conoidea
- Family: Mangeliidae
- Genus: Mangelia
- Species: M. concinna

Binomial name
- Mangelia concinna A.A. Gould, 1860

Synonyms
- Daphnella concinna (A.A. Gould, 1860)

Species of gastropod

Mangelia concinna is a species of sea snail, a marine gastropod mollusk in the family Mangeliidae.

This is a taxon inquirendum.

== Taxonomy ==
Mangelia concinna was described in 1860 by American conchologist Augustus A. Gould, based on a specimen collected from waters near Okinawa between 1838 and 1842 during the United States North Pacific Exploring and Surveying Expedition.

== Description ==
The shell attains a length 10 mm and a diameter of 4 mm.

(Original descrfiption in Latin) The shell is thin, elongate-ovate, and turreted, exhibiting a glossy surface that is sculptured with very fine transverse striae. Its base color is straw-colored, adorned with square rust-colored spots near the suture, followed by a narrow white band, and finally painted with reddish bands and lines. Comprising eight whorls that slope backward, the upper ones appear striate. The aperture measures half the total length and is narrow. The outer lip is thin, and a sinus is almost absent. The columella appears rounded and polished, and the siphonal canal is wide and very short.

== Distribution ==
This marine species inhabits waters near the island of Okinawa in the Ryukyu Islands of Japan.
