= Shanghai People's Heroes Memorial Tower =

Monument in Shanghai, China

Coordinates: 31.24427°N 121.48695°E

Shanghai People's Heroes Memorial Tower 上海市人民英雄纪念塔
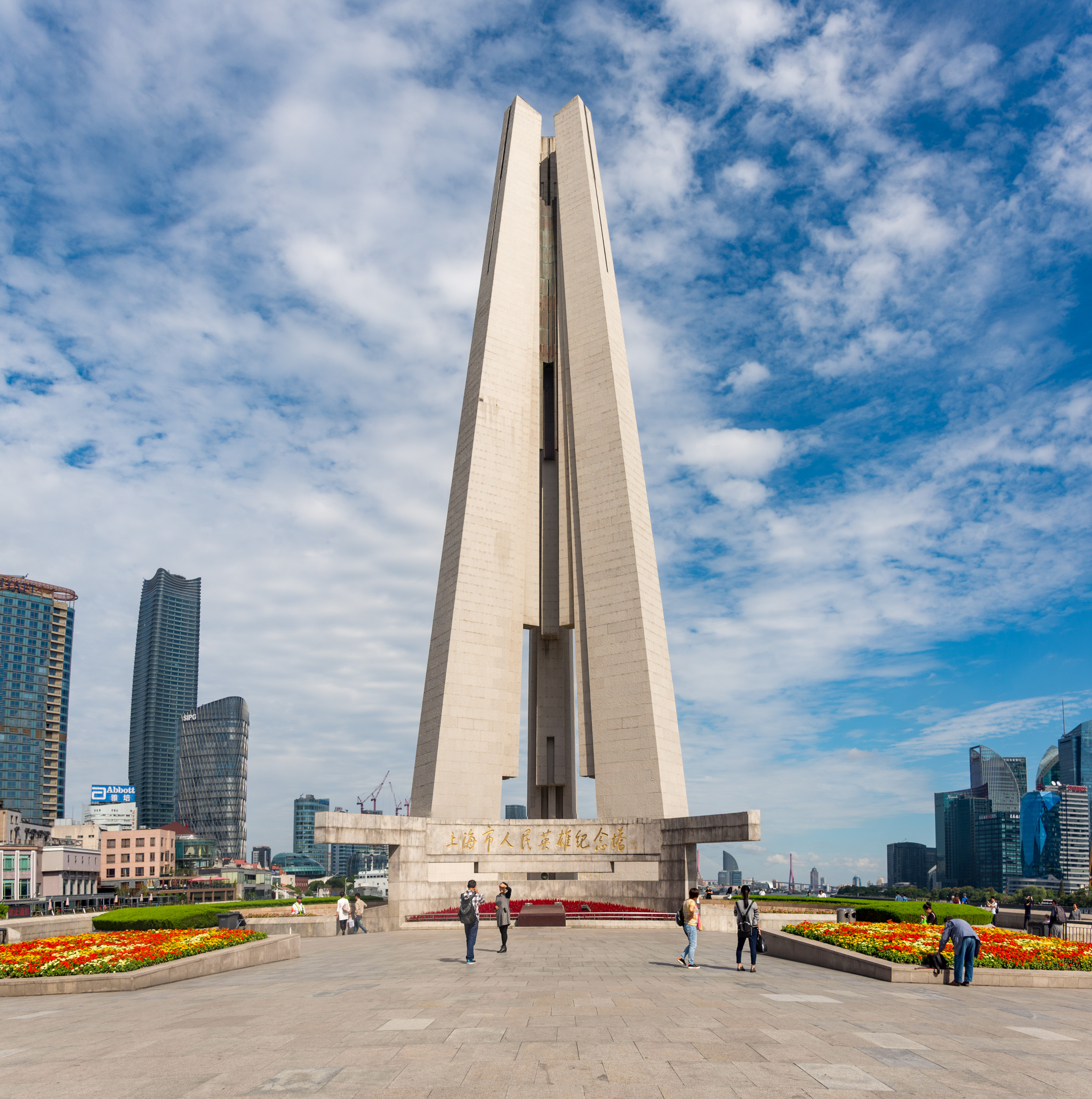
- Shanghai People's Heroes Memorial Tower in 2016
- Medium: Concrete sculpture
- Location: Shanghai, China

The Shanghai People's Heroes Memorial Tower (上海市人民英雄纪念塔) is a concrete structure in Shanghai, China. The structure is located at the north end of the Bund, at the confluence of the Suzhou Creek and the Huangpu River, within the grounds of the Huangpu Park.

The structure was built by the Shanghai Municipal People's Government in 1993 to commemorate Communist revolutionary martyrs (who took the city on 25 May 1949 from Nationalist forces), as well as those who have died fighting natural disasters.

The structure stands 24 metres (79 ft) tall, and is built in the stylised shape of three rifles leaning against each other to show respect to those who fought for their homeland.

== Gallery ==
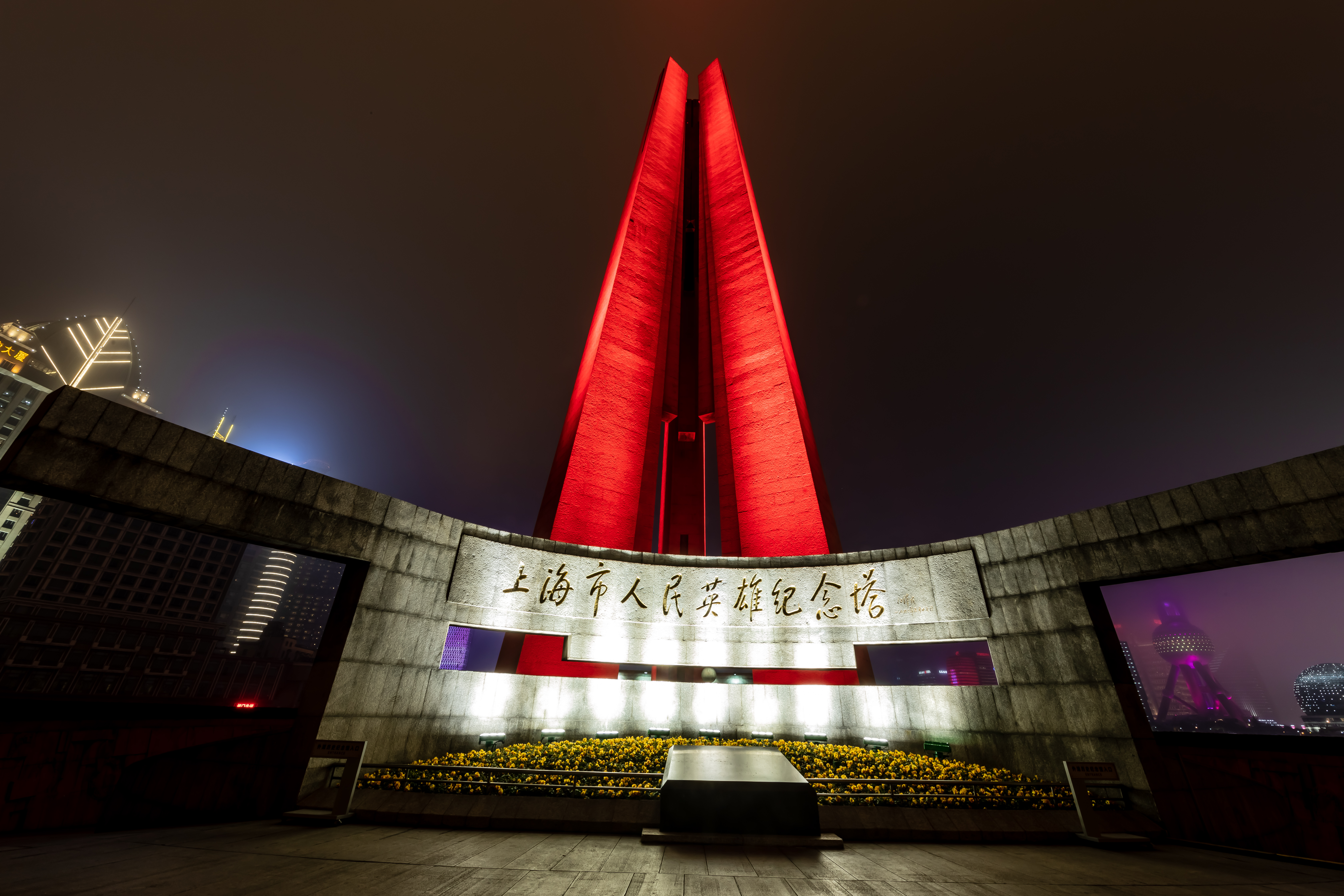

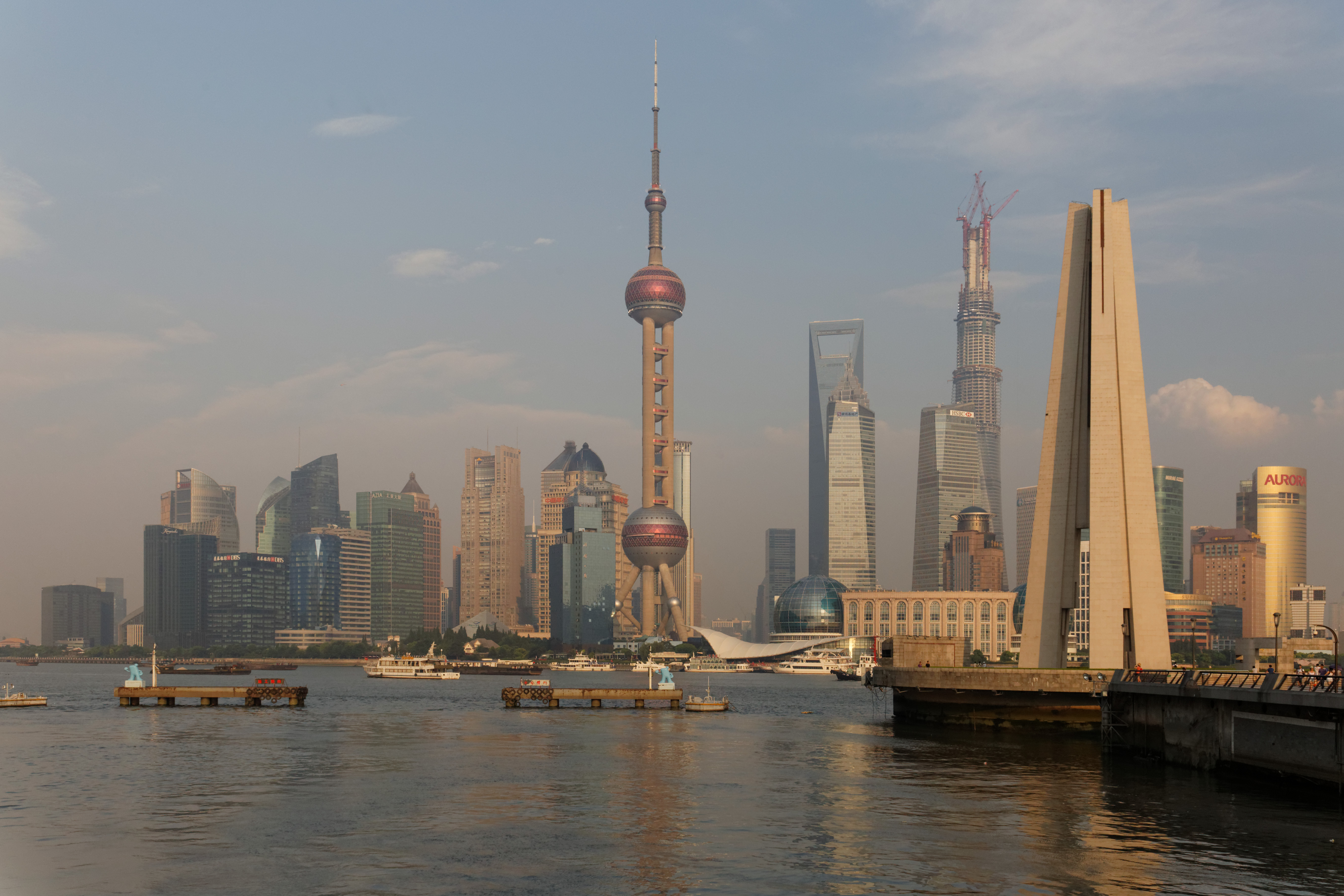

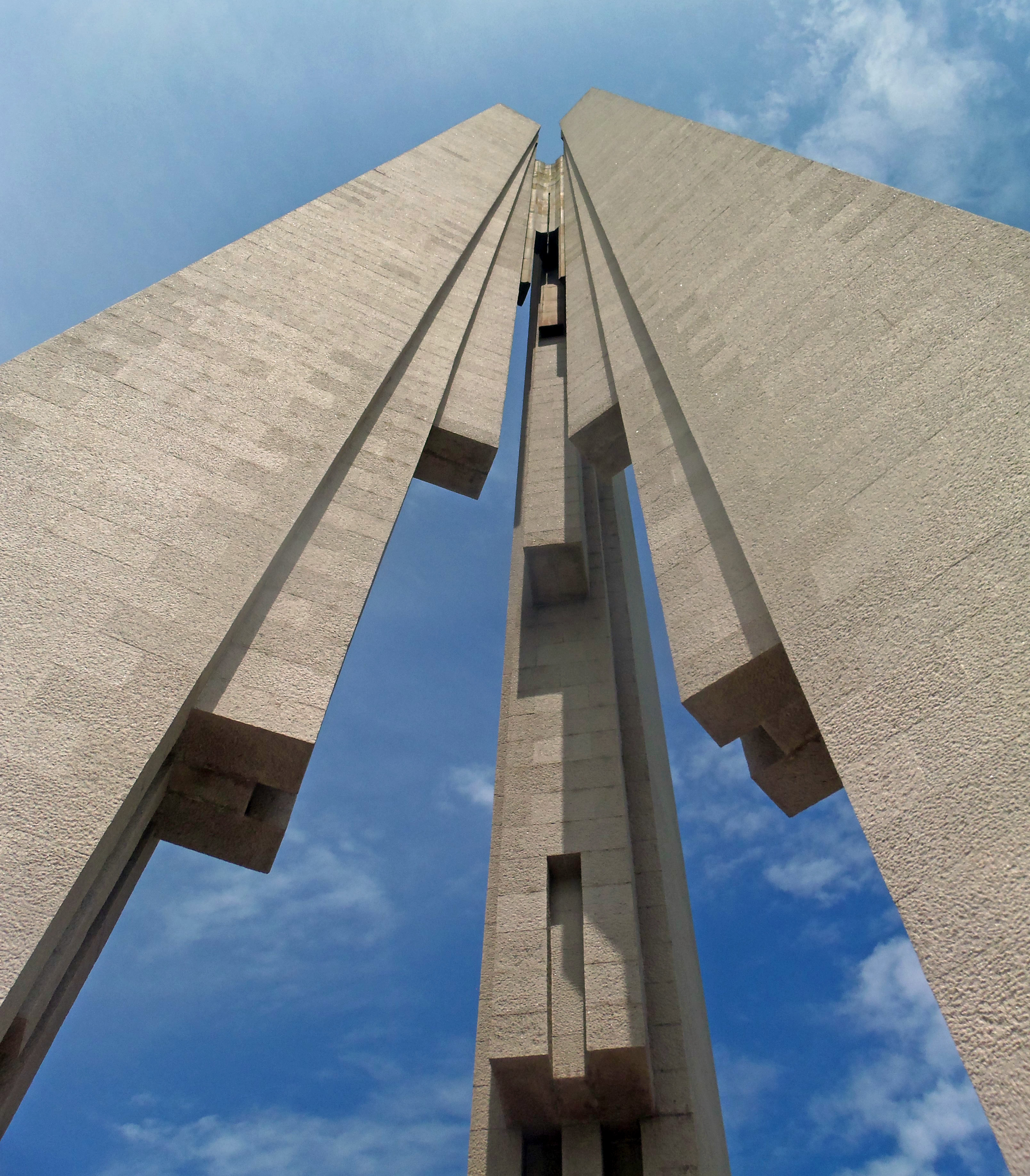

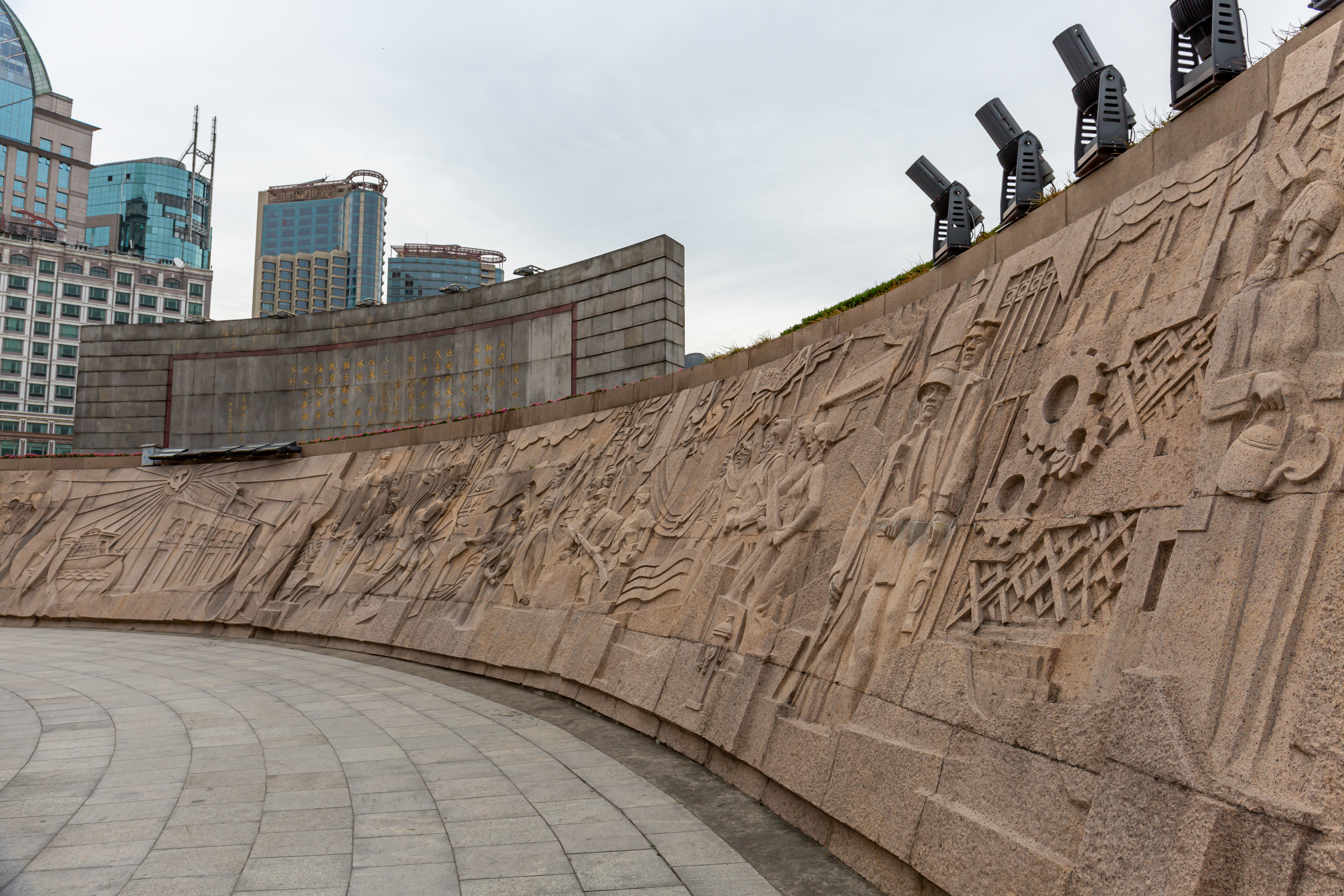

== See also ==
- Monument to the People's Heroes in Beijing
- Civilian War Memorial: a monument in Singapore with architectural similarities
- Shanghai Allied War Memorial, a demolished monument on the Bund
