= Circuit intendant of Shanghai =

Political office in the Qing dynasty

- Traditional Chinese: 上海道臺
- Simplified Chinese: 上海道台
Transcriptions
Standard Mandarin
- Hanyu Pinyin: Shànghǎi dàotái
- Wade–Giles: Shang-hai tao-t‘ai
Wu
- Romanization: Zaanhe daude [zɑ̃²³hɛ³⁴ dɔ²³dɛ²³]

The circuit intendant of Shanghai or the daotai of Shanghai, also formerly romanized as taotai or tao tai, was an imperial Chinese official who oversaw the circuit of Shanghai, then part of Jiangsu Province, in the Qing Empire. He oversaw the area's courts, law enforcement, civic defense, canals, and customs collection. As well as areas within modern Shanghai, his remit also included Qidong in present-day Jiangsu.

The position was only compensated at the senior fourth rank (正四品官), the seventh level from the top in the 9 rank, 18 level system, but, in addition to other sources of income, it was seen as a springboard to higher office within the empire.

== History ==
The original seat of the circuit was at Taicang. It was moved to Shanghai in the 18th century. The first foreign settlement in Shanghai, the British Concession, was established by the Land Regulations (土地章程) undertaken on the initiative of the intendant Gong Mujiu. His was the one who signed it on behalf of the Qing government on 29 November 1845. Lin Gui approved the British consul Rutherford Alcock's proposal to extend the British boundary west from Barrier Road (界路, today's Henan Rd.) to Thibet Road (泥城浜, now Xizang Rd.) on 27 November 1848. On 6 April 1849, he signed the agreement with Charles de Montigny formalizing and delineating the city's French Concession. An intendant was also involved with the establishment of the Shanghai International Settlement upon the merging of the British and American settlements in 1863.

The intendant was forced to flee the Small Sword Society in 1853 amid the chaos surrounding the Taiping Rebellion.

The intendants of the 1870s and '80s resisted French plans to expand their concession southwest, particularly the construction of a road through Shanghai's Ningbo Cemetery to connect the French Concession with Xujiahui (then "Siccawei"). One of the intendants in the 1890s finally yielded upon an agreement by the French to pay the duly assessed value of the land condemned, but the demolition of the cemetery walls in July 1898 prompted riots which killed twelve and the landing of French troops to protect the construction workers.

== List ==
Installed	Name		Origin	Notes
1730	Xu Yongyou	徐永佑		
1731	Wang Chenghui	王澄慧	Henan	
1735	Li Shan	礼山	Manchu army	
1735	Cui Lin	崔琳	Shanxi	
1736	Weng Zao	翁藻	Zhejiang	
1740	Li Shijie	李士杰	Hubei	Acting
1740	Weng Zao	翁藻	Zhejiang	
1740	Wang Yunming	王云铭	Shandong	
1743	Wang Dexin	汪德馨	Henan	
1745	Tuo Enduo	托恩多	Manchu	
1747	Fu Chun	傅椿	Manchu	
1748	Tao Shihuang	陶士偟	Hunan	
1748	Zhu Lin	朱霖	Manchu army	Acting
1749	Guang An	广安	Manchu	
1843	Gong Mujiu	宫慕久	Dongping in Shandong	
March 1847	Xian Ling	咸龄		
April 1848	Wu Jianzhang	吴健彰	Xiangshan in Guangdong	Acting
1848	Lin Gui	麟桂	Manchu	
August 1851	Wu Jianzhang	吴健彰	Xiangshan in Guangdong	Acting
August 1854	Lan Weiwen	蓝蔚雯		Acting
October 1857	Xue Huan	薛焕		
1858	Wu Xu	吴煦		
1862	Huang Fang	黄芳		Acting
July 1864	Ding Richang	丁日昌		
September 1865	Ying Baoshi	应宝时		
1869	Tu Zongying	涂宗瀛		
1872	Shen Bingcheng	沈秉成		
1875	Fen Junguang	冯焌光		
May 1877	Liu Ruifen	刘瑞芬		
April 1882	Shao Youlian	邵友濂		
October 1896	Lü Haihuan	吕海寰		
July 1897	Cai Jun	蔡钧		
April 1899	Li Guangjiu	李光久		
1899	Yu Lianyuan	余联沅		
1901	Yuan Shuxun	袁树勋		Transferred
1906	Rui Cheng	瑞澂		Itinerant

== See also ==
- Mayor of Shanghai
- Old City of Shanghai
