= Shanghai Volunteer Corps =

1853–1942 multinational military unit

- Active: 12 April 1853 – 27 February 1942
- Country: Shanghai International Settlement
- Type: local auxiliary militia
- Anniversaries: 1854, 1938, 1954
- Engagements: January 28 Incident (1932); Battle of Shanghai (1937)

Shanghai Volunteer Corps
- Traditional Chinese: 上海萬國商團
- Simplified Chinese: 上海万国商团
- Literal meaning: Shanghai Myriad-Nation Urban Defense Corps
Transcriptions
Standard Mandarin
- Hanyu Pinyin: Shànghǎi Wànguó Shāngtuán
- Wade–Giles: Shang-hai Wan-kuo Shang-tʻuan

The Shanghai Volunteer Corps (SVC) (1853−1942) was a multinational, mostly volunteer paramilitary force controlled by the Shanghai Municipal Council, which governed the Shanghai International Settlement.

== History ==
The SVC being reviewed in 1892

The Shanghai Volunteer Corps was created on 12 April 1853 during the Small Swords Society's uprising. It saw action alongside British and American military units in the 1854 Battle of Muddy Flat, when Qing imperial troops besieging the rebel-held city ignored foreign demands to move further away from the foreign concessions. Concerned that the Qing forces were drawing rebel fire into the settlements, the foreign consuls and military commanders authorised an attack on the Qing forces to dislodge them. The operation was successful, and the battle was thereafter commemorated as an important event in the history of the SVC. The Corps was disbanded in 1855 but reestablished in 1861. In 1870 the Shanghai Municipal Council took over the running of the SVC.

The unit was mobilised in 1900 for the Boxer Rebellion and in 1914 for the First World War. In 1916 the British recruited Chinese to serve in the Chinese Labour Corps for service in rear areas on the Western Front to free troops for front line duty. Many members of the SVC served as officers in the CLC. In 1910 the German contingent consisted of one regular company ("Prinz Heinrich Kompagnie") and one reserve company. When the First World War broke out at least forty of the German volunteers in Shanghai left to join the 7. Kompagnie of the III. Seebataillon in the defence of Qingdao.

At various times during its history the Shanghai Volunteer Corps included Scottish, American, Chinese, Italian, Austro-Hungarian, Danish, French, German, Filipino, Jewish, Portuguese, Japanese, White Russian, and Eurasian companies. The SVC had around 20 nationalities. The British War Office supplied weapons and a commanding officer. The German and the Austro-Hungarian companies were disbanded in 1917 when China declared war on Germany.

== Symbols ==
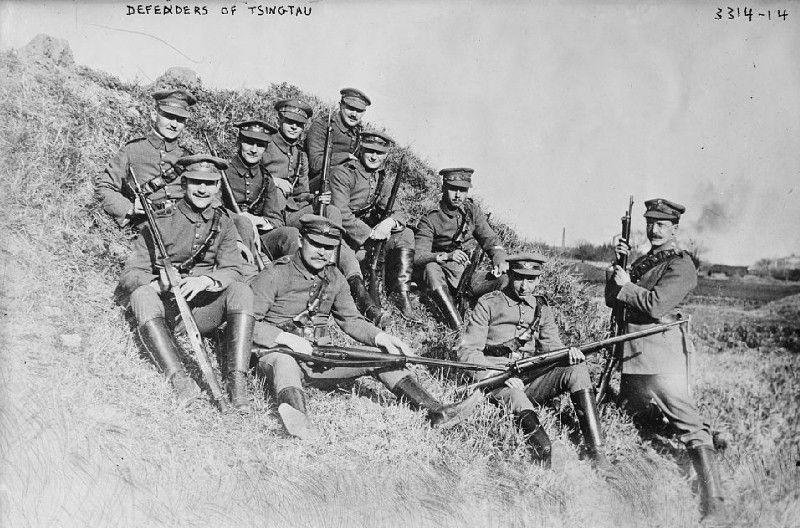
Volunteers from the German Prinz Heinrich Kompagnie of the SVC in Qingdao, 1914.

Prior to 1914 some of the national contingents wore distinctive parade uniforms at their own expense, modelled on those of their respective armies.

While the uniforms of each company differed in many ways, each made use of the Cap badge of the SVC which consisted of an eight-pointed Brunswick star with the letters "SVC" and the date "4th April 1854" in a scroll underneath. The official seal of the Volunteer Corps was different however and consisted of the Municipal Council seal as approved in 1868 on a gold Brunswick star and was exactly the same except the council title and motto was replaced with "Shanghai Volunteer Corps" and the Prussian flag (representing Germany) was retained even when it was removed from the council flag after 1917.

The insignia of the companies also differed: the German Company, "Prinz Heinrich Kompagnie", wore a crowned "H" monogram on their shoulder straps for Prince Heinrich of Prussia (Kaiser Wilhelm II's younger brother and commander of the German East Asia Squadron, 1899–1903), and the Jewish Company, who wore collar insignia consisting of a Star of David with "SVC" in the centre. The Portuguese Company wore red collar tabs, as worn by the Portuguese Army, and had the distinction of being the only SVC unit to be decorated by any government, when on 5 October 1932, the Portuguese Minister to China presented the company with the Military Order of Christ.

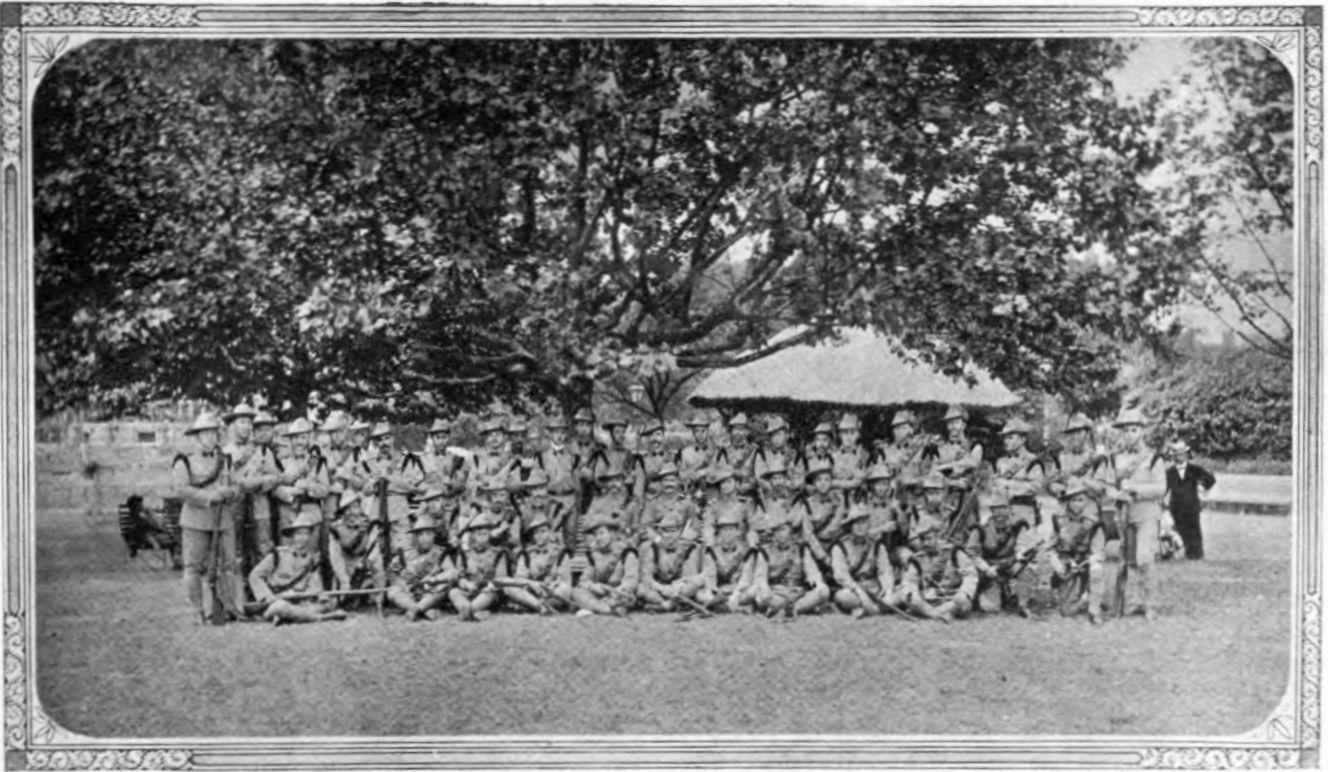
Portuguese Company of the SVC in 1908.

== Units ==
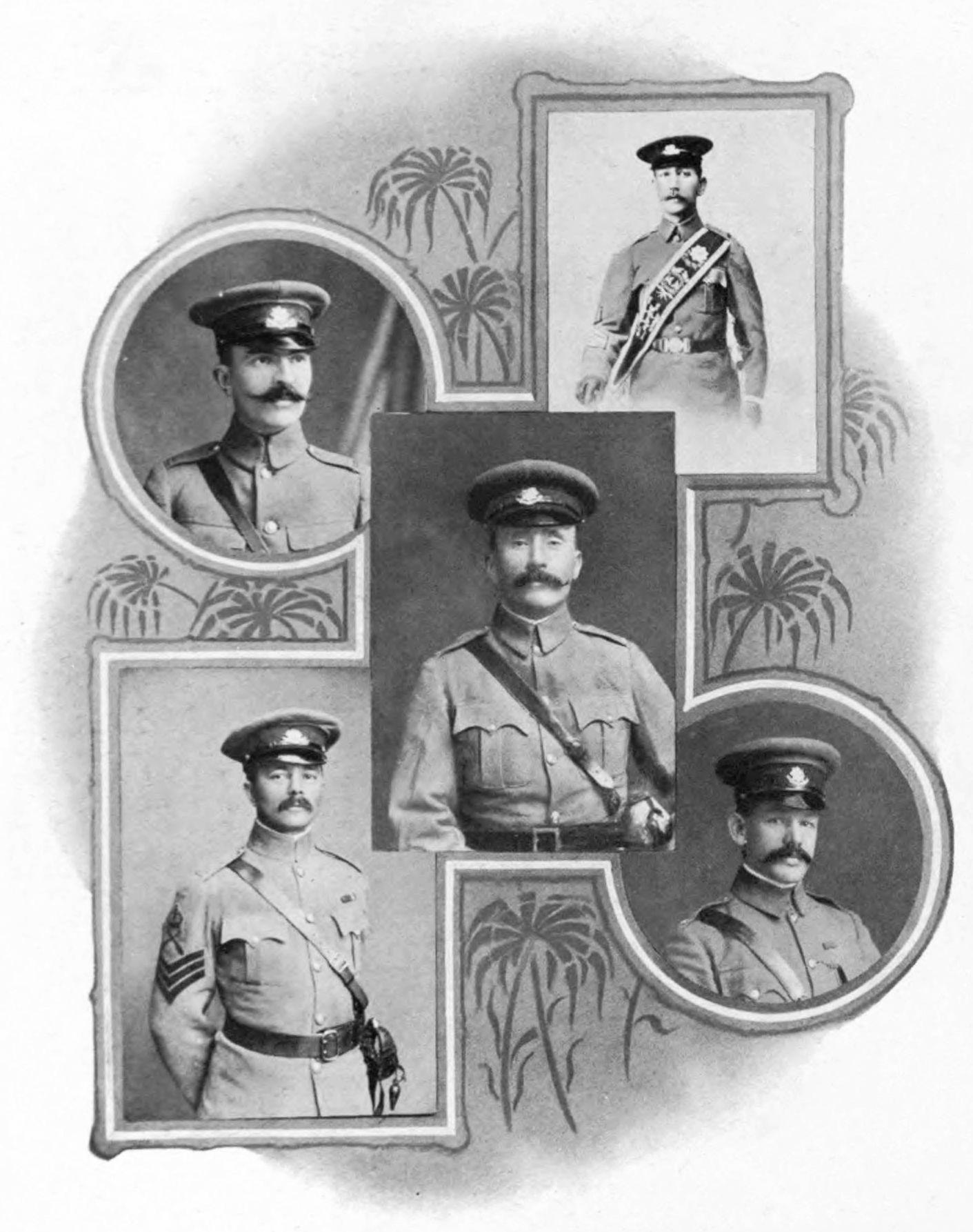
British Officers of the SVC in 1908.

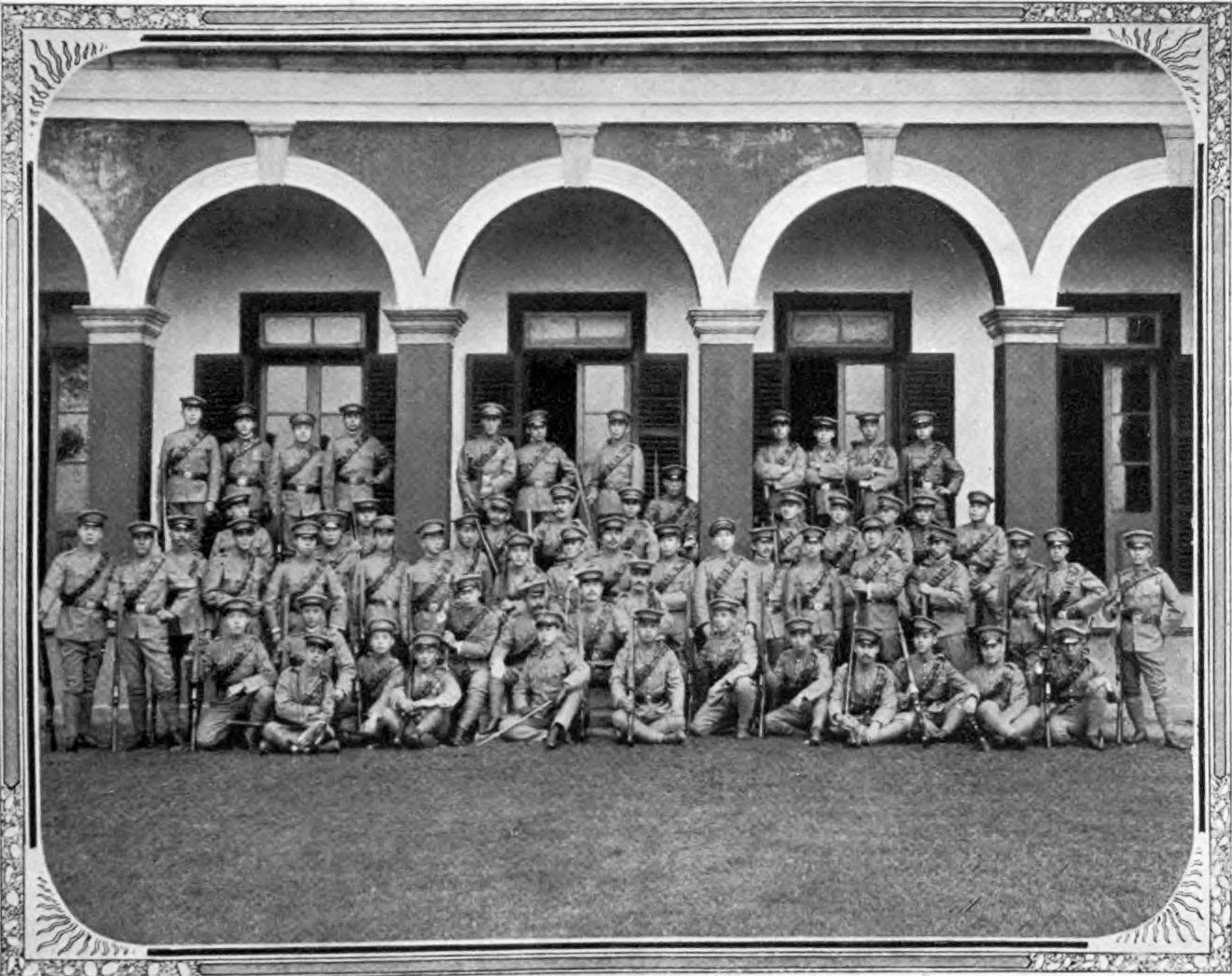
Japanese Company in the SVC, 1908.

The SVC reached its maximum strength in the early 1930s where it consisted of the following units-

- Light Horse (1882, American Troop)
- Field Artillery Battery
- Light Artillery Battery (prior to 1924 it was the Scandinavian Company)
- Field (Engineers) Company
- Armoured Car Company (1928)
- "A" Company (British)
- "B" Company (1890, Eurasian)
- "C" Company (Chinese)
- American Company (1900)
- Japanese Company (1907)
- "H" Company (1932, Jewish Company)
- Philippine Company (1932, under American Officers)
- Portuguese Company (1906)
- Shanghai Scottish (1914)
- American Machine Gun Company (1932)
- Transport Company (1932)
- Signals Company (1932)
- Interpreter Company (1932)
- Air Defence Company
- Public School Cadet Company
- White Russian Regiment (1927)
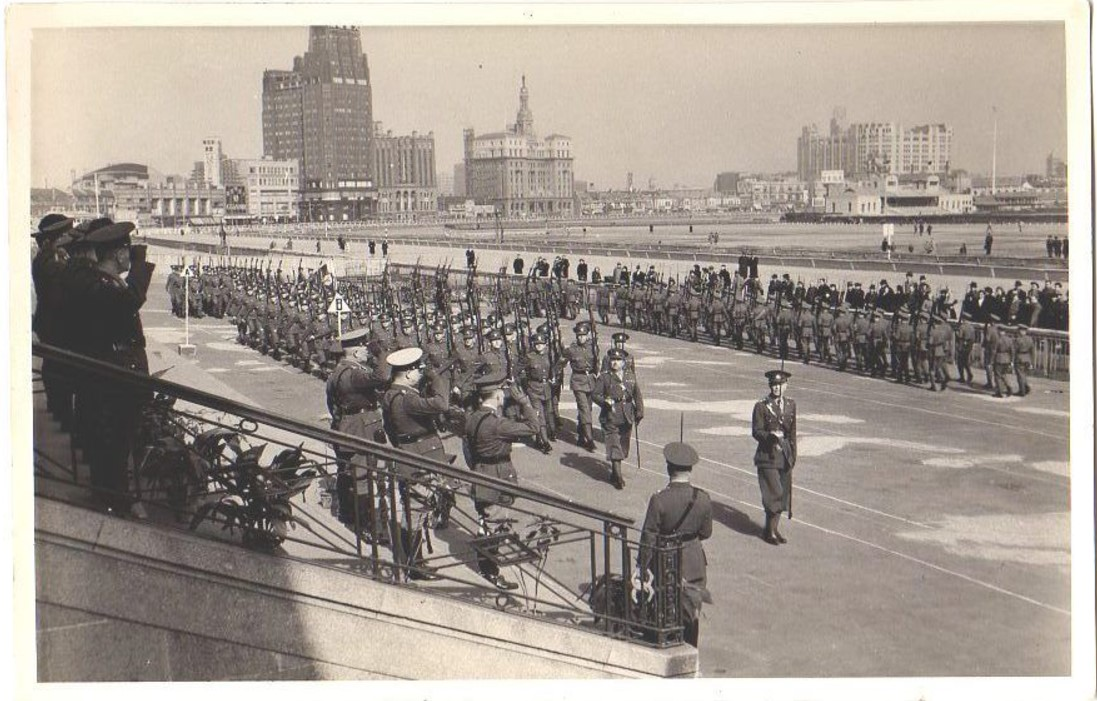
  White Russian Regiment, 1930s

The German Company, founded in 1891 and granted permission to be named the "Prinz Heinrich Kompagnie" in 1898, and the Austro-Hungarian Company, founded in 1912, were both disbanded in 1917 with China's entry into the First World War. The Italian Company, founded in 1914, also later disbanded in 1920.

With the exception of the White Russians, the Corps were all unpaid Volunteers with the SVC financed by the Shanghai Municipal Council. On 16 January 1941 the Russian Regiment became the Auxiliary Detachment of the Shanghai Municipal Police.

== Commandants ==
The following officers served as commandant of the SVC:

- Lieutenant T. F. Wade (1854)
- R. C. Antrobus (1864–1865)
- Sir Harry Smith Parkes (1865)
- Sir Edmund Grimani Hornby (1865–1867)
- Captain T. Brewer (1870–1874)
- Major J. Hart (1874–1879)
- Major J. F. Holliday (1879–1881)
- Major C. J. Holliday (1881–1886)
- Major G. J. Morrison (1886–1891)
- Major C. J. Holliday (1891–1892)
- Major G. J. Morrison (1894–1896)
- Captain Donald Mackenzie (1896–1897)
- Major C. J. Holliday (1898–1900)
- Captain Donald Mackenzie (1900–1903)
- Lieutenant Colonel W. M. Watson (1903–1908)
- Lieutenant Colonel A. A. S. Barnes (1908–1913)
- Lieutenant Colonel R. N. Bray (1914–1915)
- Lieutenant Colonel T. E. Trueman OBE (1915–1920)
- Lieutenant J. Howard Crocker (1916)
- Colonel R. Marr Johnson CMG DSO (1920–1922)
- Major H. W. Pilcher (1923)
- Colonel W. F. L. Gordon CMG CBE DSO (1923–1928)
- Colonel H. B. Orpen-Palmer CMG DSO (1928–1931)
- Colonel N. W. B. B. Thoms OBE DSO MC (1931–1934)
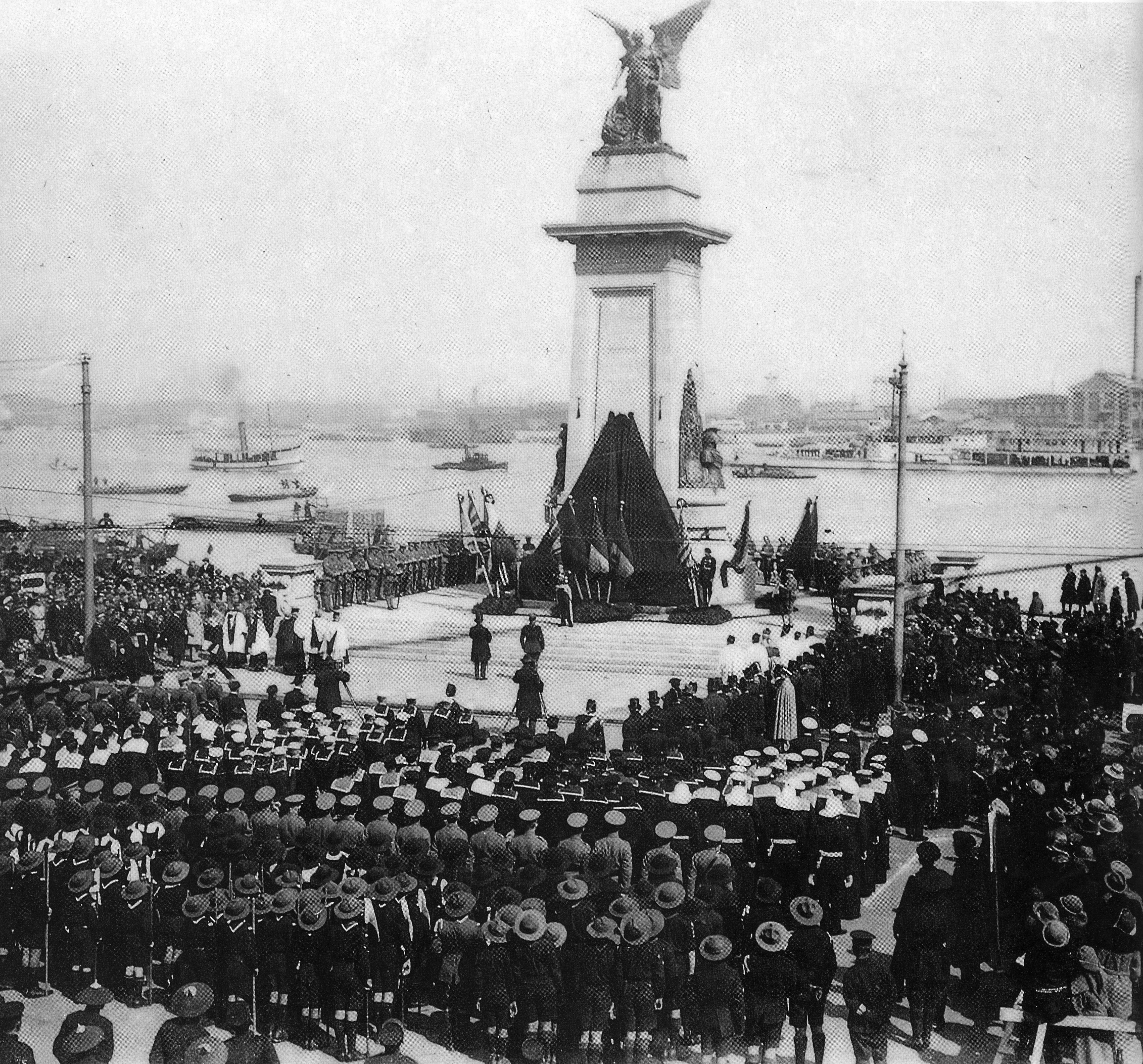
  The SVC (along with local scouts) in formation at the ceremonial unveiling of the Shanghai Allied War Memorial in 1924
  Colonel F. R. W. Graham DSO MC (1934–1937)
- Colonel J. W. Hornby MC (1937–1940)
- Lieutenant Colonel G. H. Mann MC (1940–1942)

== Awards ==
Members of the volunteer corps were made eligible for several medals for service by the Municipal Council during its history. In addition to being eligible for awards from members' own native countries, these awards held official status and could be worn with other medals with the status of a foreign award. These medals included:

- Shanghai Jubilee Medal, created in 1893, it was distributed as part of the 50th Jubilee celebrations on 17 November 1893, being the anniversary of the arrival of the first British Consul after the Treaty of Nanking. Cast in silver, the medal consists of the municipal seal and the text "17 November 1843" on the obverse with a stylised shield engraved with the recipient's name and the text "Shanghai Jubilee. November 17, 1893." name between a steamship and two Chinese dragons on the reverse.
- Shanghai Volunteer Corps Long Service Medal, created in 1925, was awarded for 12 years cumulative service with the SVC. Bars for additional periods of service were also awarded. Cast in silver, the medal consists of the SVC seal with the text "For Long Service" on the obverse and the recipient's name and service years on the reverse.
- Shanghai Municipal Council 1937 Service Medal, created in 1937, was awarded to members of the SVC, Police and civilians who had participated in operations protecting the International Settlement during the Japanese invasion of Shanghai in late 1937. An eight-pointed Brunswick star in bronze, the medal consists of the municipal seal on the obverse and the text "For Service Rendered August 12th to November 12th, 1937" on the reverse.

== Disbandment ==
The SVC was disbanded early in 1942 after the Japanese took over the International Settlement. The decision was formally made by the still existing Shanghai Municipal Council who held a reception to mark the placing of the Corps' colours "in a place of dignity and honour" in the Council chambers. A 'Centenary Dinner' was held in Hong Kong on 2 April 1954.

== See also ==
- Shanghai Defense Force
