= Ying Baoshi =

Chinese politician

- Traditional Chinese: 應寶時
- Simplified Chinese: 应宝时
Transcriptions
Standard Mandarin
- Hanyu Pinyin: Yìng Bǎoshí
- Wade–Giles: Ying Pao-shih

Ying Baoshi was the circuit intendant ("tao tai") of Shanghai from 1865 to 1868.

== Legacy ==
His treatise "The Seven Nos" (Note: 七不可, p Qī Bù Kě, w Chih-pu-k'o.) was influential in limiting rail construction in China in the late 19th century.

== See also ==
- History of rail transport in China
