= HMS Grecian (1838) =

History

United Kingdom
- Name: Grecian
- Ordered: 31 December 1835
- Builder: Pembroke Dockyard
- Laid down: July 1836
- Launched: 24 April 1838
- Completed: 19 September 1838
- Commissioned: 10 December 1838
- Fate: Broken up by 1 November 1865

General characteristics
- Class & type: Acorn-class brig-sloop
- Tons burthen: 484 40/94 bm
- Length: 105 ft (32.0 m) (Gun deck); 82 ft 7 in (25.2 m) (Keel)
- Beam: 33 ft 7 in (10.2 m)
- Draught: 11 ft 8 in (3.6 m)
- Depth: 14 ft 10 in (4.5 m)
- Complement: 110–130
- Armament: 16 × 32-pdr carronades

HMS Grecian was a sixteen-gun Acorn-class brig-sloop built for the Royal Navy during the 1830s.

== Description ==
Grecian had a length at the gundeck of 105 feet (32.0 m) and 82 feet 7 inches (25.2 m) at the keel. She had a beam of 33 feet 7 inches (10.2 m), a draught of 11 feet 8 inches (3.6 m) and a depth of hold of 14 feet 10 inches (4.5 m). The ship's tonnage was 484 40/94 tons burthen. Grecian was armed with sixteen 32-pounder carronades. The Acorn class had a crew of 110–30 officers and ratings.

== Construction and career ==
Grecian, the third ship of her name to serve in the Royal Navy, was ordered on 31 December 1835, laid down in July 1837 at Pembroke Dockyard, Wales, and launched on 24 April 1838. She was completed on 10 December 1838 at Plymouth Dockyard and commissioned on 19 September of that year.
