= USS John Hancock (1850) =

Tugboat of the United States Navy

History

United States
- Name: USS John Hancock
- Namesake: John Hancock (1737–1793), early American patriot
- Builder: Boston Navy Yard, Boston, Massachusetts
- Launched: 26 October 1850
- Commissioned: 6 September 1851
- Decommissioned: Late 1851
- Recommissioned: 19 March 1853
- Decommissioned: 23 August 1856
- Fate: Sold, 17 August 1865; Wrecked 7 March 1893

General characteristics as U.S. Navy tug (before 1853 rebuild)
- Type: Steam tug
- Displacement: 230 long tons (234 t)
- Length: 113 ft (34 m)
- Beam: 22 ft (6.7 m)
- Draft: 10 ft 6 in (3.20 m)
- Propulsion: Steam engine, screw-propelled
- Speed: 7 knots (13 km/h; 8.1 mph)
- Complement: 20 officers and enlisted
- Armament: 1 × 6-pounder gun

General characteristics as commercial fishing vessel
- Type: Topsail schooner
- Tonnage: 167.62 tons
- Length: 143.7 ft (43.8 m)
- Beam: 23.5 ft (7.2 m)
- Depth: 8.5 ft (2.6 m)

USS John Hancock was an armed steam tug in the United States Navy during the 1850s. She was named for Founding Father John Hancock and saw action against rioters in Massachusetts, filbusters in Cuba, rebels in China, and Native Americans in the Washington Territory. She took part in a hydrographic surveying expedition to East Asia and the Pacific Ocean.

After her U.S. Navy service ended, John Hancock operated under the United States Department of State, served as floating powder magazine, and entered commercial service as a cod-fishing schooner before she was wrecked in 1893.

== Service history ==
=== 1850–1853 ===
John Hancock was launched at the Boston Navy Yard in Boston, Massachusetts, on 26 October 1850 for service as a steam tug and water tank in that yard. However, she was soon manned by a temporary crew and dispatched to New Bedford, Massachusetts, to aid in quelling riots. When order had been restored, she returned to Boston, where she served until the summer of 1851, when she steamed to Annapolis, Maryland, for duty as a practice ship at the United States Naval Academy. At the end of the summer's midshipmen cruises, she sailed to New York City, where she was commissioned on 6 September 1851 with Lieutenant J. W. Livingston in command.

On 9 September 1851, John Hancock departed New York for Havana, Cuba, to assist in suppressing the last filibustering expedition led by Narciso López, which had been launched from the United States in violation of American neutrality laws. She arrived at Havana on 29 September 1851, but her duty there terminated on 3 October 1851, when extremely stormy weather damaged her and caused her to return to Boston via Charleston, South Carolina, and New York.

She was placed in ordinary at the Boston Navy Yard and rebuilt almost entirely. She received a new bow and stern, increasing her length to 165 ft 6 in 165 feet 6 inches (50.4 m) and her displacement to 382 tons but not affecting her beam or draft. John Hancock was relaunched on 24 February 1853 and recommissioned 19 March 1853 with Lieutenant John Rodgers in command.

=== Survey ship, 1853–1856 ===
John Hancock stood out of New York Harbor on 3 May 1853 and joined Commander Cadwallader Ringgold's North Pacific Exploring and Surveying Expedition at Hampton Roads three days later. United States Secretary of the Navy James C. Dobbin visited the ship at Norfolk, Virginia, on 2 June 1853, nine days before the squadron sailed for the Pacific. After stopping at Funchal in the Madeira Islands, Porto Praya in the Cape Verde Islands; and Simonstown, False Bay, in the Cape Colony, the expedition arrived Batavia on Java in the Netherlands East Indies on 12 December 1853.

The expedition devoted the next five months to conducting hydrographic surveys of the waters surrounding the large islands off the coast of Southeast Asia. Early in May 1854, John Hancock departed for Hong Kong, where she arrived on 24 May 1854. The squadron operated from Hong Kong as its base throughout the summer of 1854, surveying nearby coast, islands, and rivers. At this time China was plagued by rebellion and pirates endangering foreigners and threatening their property. The American ships were a source of stability and order protecting American citizens and interests. While John Hancock steamed up the Canton River in China, rebel Chinese artillery batteries fired on two of her armed boats from John Hancock, which promptly returned fire and silenced the Chinese guns.

Serious illness compelled Commander Ringgold to relinquish command of the expedition on 11 August 1854, leaving Lieutenant Rodgers in charge. Lieutenant Henry K. Stevens then took command of John Hancock. She departed Hong Kong on 9 September 1854 and sailed north along the coast of China, surveying as she went. She arrived at Shanghai, China, on 27 November 1854 and remained there under repair until 28 January 1855, when she resumed surveying operations which took her north along the eastern coast of Asia to the Sea of Okhotsk before she turned south along the western coast of North America. Besides greatly increasing knowledge of the western and northern Pacific Ocean, stimulating commerce, and easing navigation in previously unknown seas, the operations helped to establish friendly relations between the United States and several countries in East Asia.

John Hancock arrived at San Francisco, California on 19 October 1855. After repairs at Mare Island Navy Yard in Vallejo, California, she stood out of San Francisco Bay on 20 March 1856 bound for Puget Sound to help suppress Native American uprisings which threatened to wipe out U.S. civilian settlements and United States Army outposts established in the early 1850s. She arrived at Seattle, Washington Territory, on 28 March 1856 and operated from that port as a base until 4 August 1856, when she stood down Puget Sound bound for San Francisco. She arrived at San Francisco on 17 August 1856.

John Hancock decommissioned at Mare Island Navy Yard on 23 August 1856 and remained there in ordinary until sold at auction on 17 August 1865.

=== Later career ===
John Hancock later operated under the control of the United States Department of State and then served as a floating powder magazine in Mission Bay in San Francisco. Subsequently, Middlemass & Boole purchased her, rigged her as a topsail schooner, and placed her in service as a cod-fishing vessel.

Under her final owners, Lynde and Hough, John Hancock departed San Francisco on 8 February 1893 bound for Sand Point on the northwestern coast of Popof Island in the Shumagin Islands off the south coast of the Alaska Peninsula in the Territory of Alaska. While moored at the wharf at Sand Point on 7 March 1893 with a crew of eight and a cargo of 80 tons of salt and provisions aboard, she broke loose from her moorings during a storm and was stranded. Her crew survived, but she and her cargo both were a total loss.
