= Yan'an Road =

Road in Shanghai, China

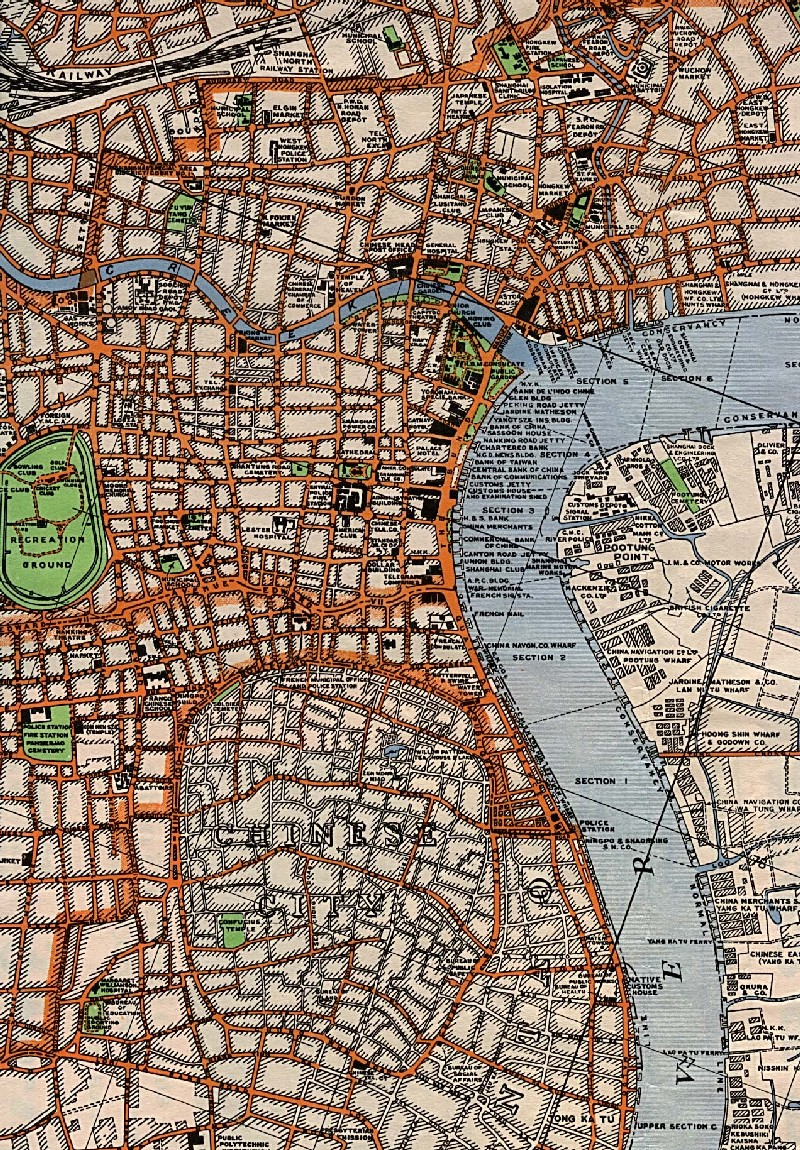
In this 1933 map of Shanghai, Avenue Edward VII (now Yan'an Road East) stretches east–west across the centre of the map.

Yan'an Road relative to the main roads network in Shanghai.

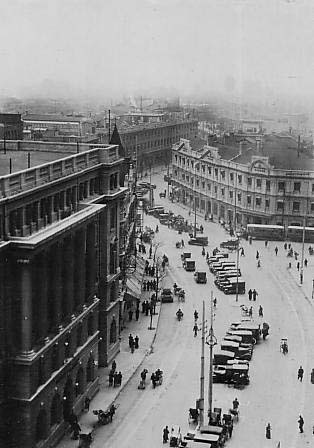
Avenue Edward VII before World War II.

Yan'an Road (Chinese: 延安路, Yán'ān Lù; Shanghainese: Yi'ue Lu) is a road in Shanghai, a major east–west thoroughfare through the centre of the city. The modern Yan'an Road is in three sections, reflecting three connected streets which existed pre-1945: Avenue Edward VII, Avenue Foch, and the Great Western Road. The streets were joined together under a common name by the Republic of China government in 1945, then renamed in the early 1950s after the Chinese Communist Party took over Shanghai. The road is named after Yan'an, the Communist base during the Chinese Civil War.

== East Yan'an Road ==
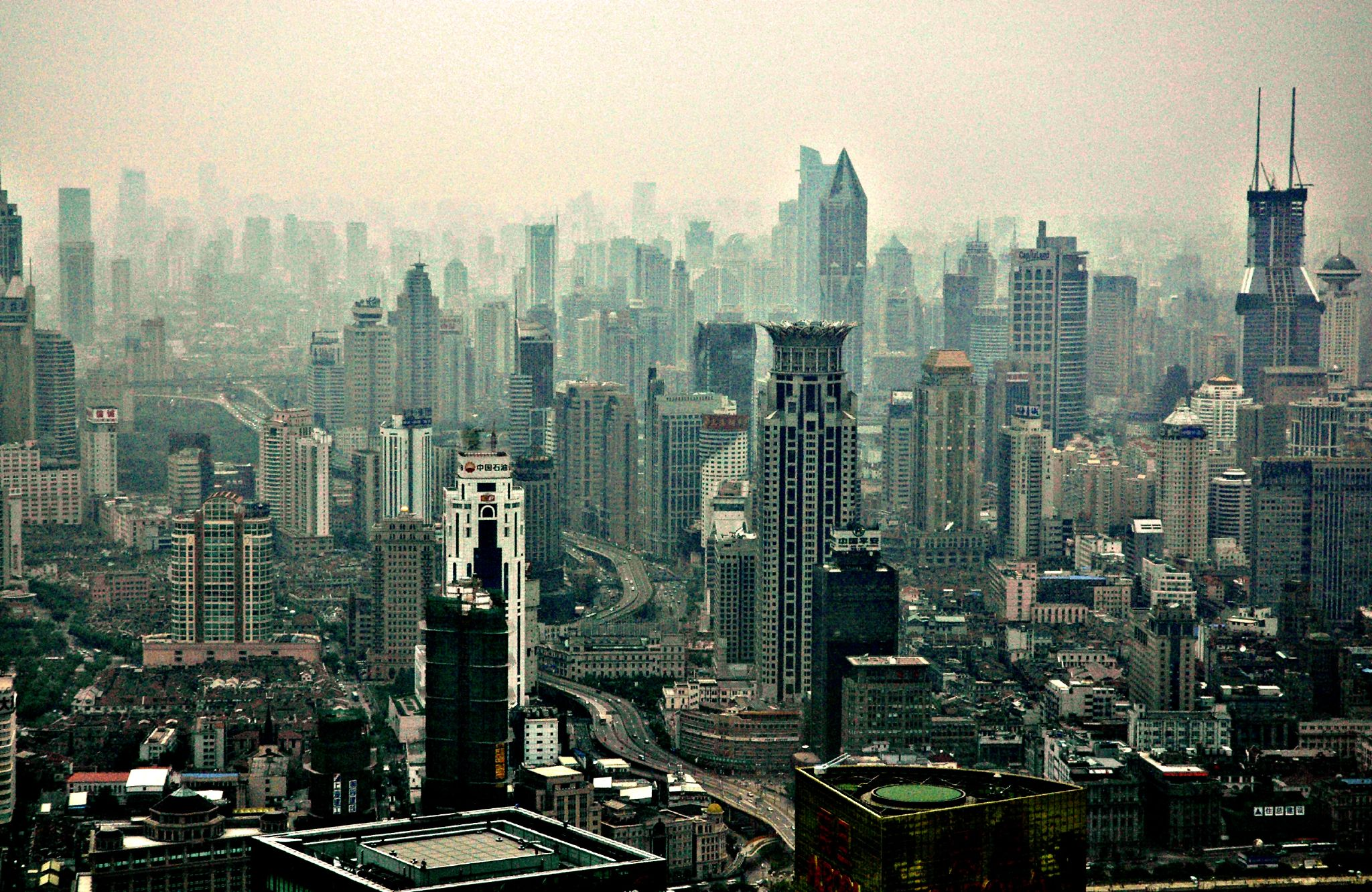
Forest of skyscrapers: aerial view west along Yan'an Road East (elevated expressway at centre) in the 2000s.

East Yan'an Road stretches from the southern end of the Bund in the east to Xizang Road (near People's Square and the customary centre of urban Shanghai) in the west. Yan'an Road East follows the course of an ancient canal, the West Yangjing Creek (the East Yangjing Creek was on the east side of the Huangpu River; the two were more closely connected when the Huangpu River was a small tributary of the larger Suzhou Creek).

Yangjing Creek (t 洋涇浜, s 洋泾浜, Yángjīng Bāng), also formerly romanized as Yang-ching-pang and Yang-king-pang, was the southern boundary of the British Concession established after the unequal Treaty of Nanjing ended the First Opium War in 1842. It soon came to form the northern boundary of the French Concession, which used the narrow space between the British Concession and the Chinese city of Shanghai proper to connect its holdings on the Bund with a larger space on the interior, eventually reaching to Xujiahui. The mix of nationalities in this area gave rise to the Chinese name "Yangjing Creek English" (t 洋涇浜英語, s 洋泾浜英语, Yángjīngbāng Yīngyǔ) for Chinese Pidgin English.

In 1914–15, authorities in the two concessions co-operated to fill in the Yangjing Creek. The former canal along with the two narrow roads which ran alongside it together became a wide avenue and a major thoroughfare. In 1916, the two authorities agreed to name the new road Avenue Edward VII, after Edward VII of the United Kingdom. In 1943, as part of a wholesale renaming of "Western" road names in Shanghai, the puppet government collaborating with the Japanese occupation renamed the road "Great Shanghai Road". In 1945, the Republic of China government, after recovering Shanghai at the end of World War II, renamed the road Zhongzheng Road East, after Chiang Kai-shek. The new Communist government of Shanghai renamed it Yan'an Road East in 1950 as part of the wholesale renaming of roads and parks named after Kuomintang figures. Yan'an refers to city of Yan'an in Shaanxi Province which was the center of the Chinese Communist Party's base area (the "Yan'an Soviet") during much of the Sino-Japanese and Civil Wars.

The eastern end of Yan'an Road East features a group of historic skyscrapers dating from the early 20th century. Further west, the road is today mainly lined with large contemporary skyscrapers, as well as several government office buildings. Other important historic sites along Yan'an Road East include the Shanghai Natural History Museum, the Great World entertainment centre, and the Shanghai Concert Hall.

== Central Yan'an Road ==
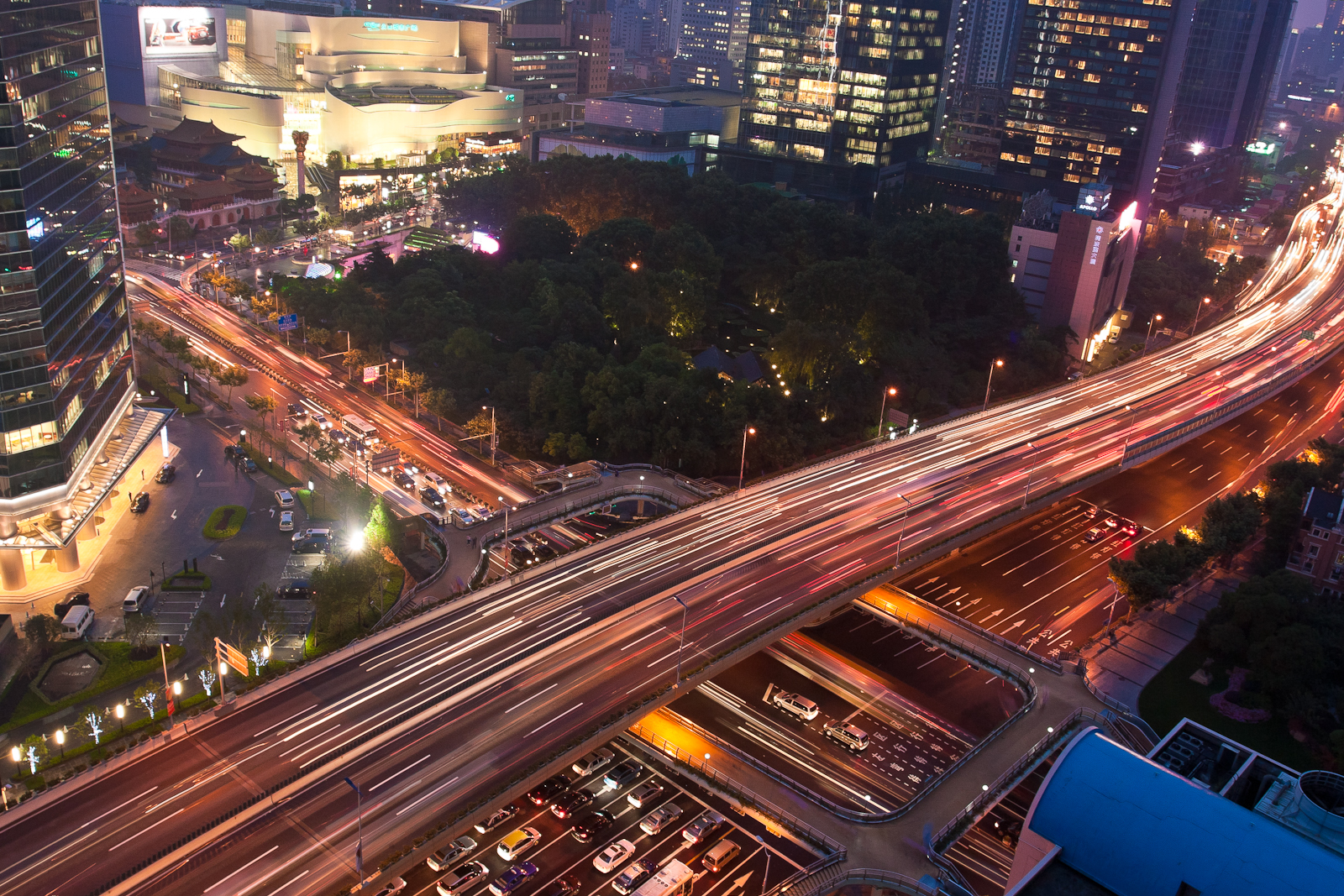
Aerial view of a section of Yan'an Road Central. Jing'an Temple is visible in the upper left.

Central Yan'an Road also follows the course of a small canal (Chang Bang). The canal also became the boundary between the International Settlement and the French Concession after the two concessions expanded west in 1899 and 1914 respectively. In 1920, the canal was filled in, and the concession authorities agreed to name it Avenue Foch, after French marshal Ferdinand Foch. In 1943 it was renamed "Luoyang Road", in 1945 it was renamed "Zhongzheng Road Central", after Chiang Kai-shek, then renamed Yan'an Road Central in 1950.

Yan'an Road Central is lined with commercial and residential buildings. Major landmarks include the Russian neo-classical Shanghai Exhibition Centre.

== West Yan'an Road ==
West Yan'an Road stretches from the western end of central Shanghai to Hongqiao Airport, in what was once the western suburbs of Shanghai, but now largely urbanised. Yan'an Road West was built by the International Settlement's municipal council in two part. The eastern part in 1910 within the western extension of the International Settlement by filling in another canal, the Chaixing Bang. The western part was an "extra-settlement road", built in 1922 beyond the western boundary of the concession (a de facto land grab to extend concession authority beyond the agreed boundaries). The road was named the Great Western Road. In 1943 it was renamed "Chang'an Road", then in 1945 it became Zhongzheng Road West, and in 1950, Yan'an Road West.

The east end of Yan'an Road West features a number of historic mansions, such as Kadoorie's House. To the west, Yan'an Road West once provided access to a number of large suburban estates and country retreats owned or used by members of the International Settlement's elites, including a golf club which is now the Shanghai Zoo. At its western end was a small aerodrome. Today, the road passes through several clusters of large commercial buildings including a large number of hotels, as well as several retreats set in large green spaces reserved for the use of the Communist Party and army elites.

It was expanded to Huqingping Highway in 1995 alongside the Xuhong Railway from Gubei Road at Hongqiao Road. At its western end, it stops at Huqingping Highway (as well as the Outer Ring Road) and goes towards Hongqiao Road, which then become Yingbinyi Road, the entrance road to Hongqiao International Airport Terminal 1.

West Yan'an Road Station at Kaixuan Road is a Shanghai Metro station.

== Post 1950 developments ==
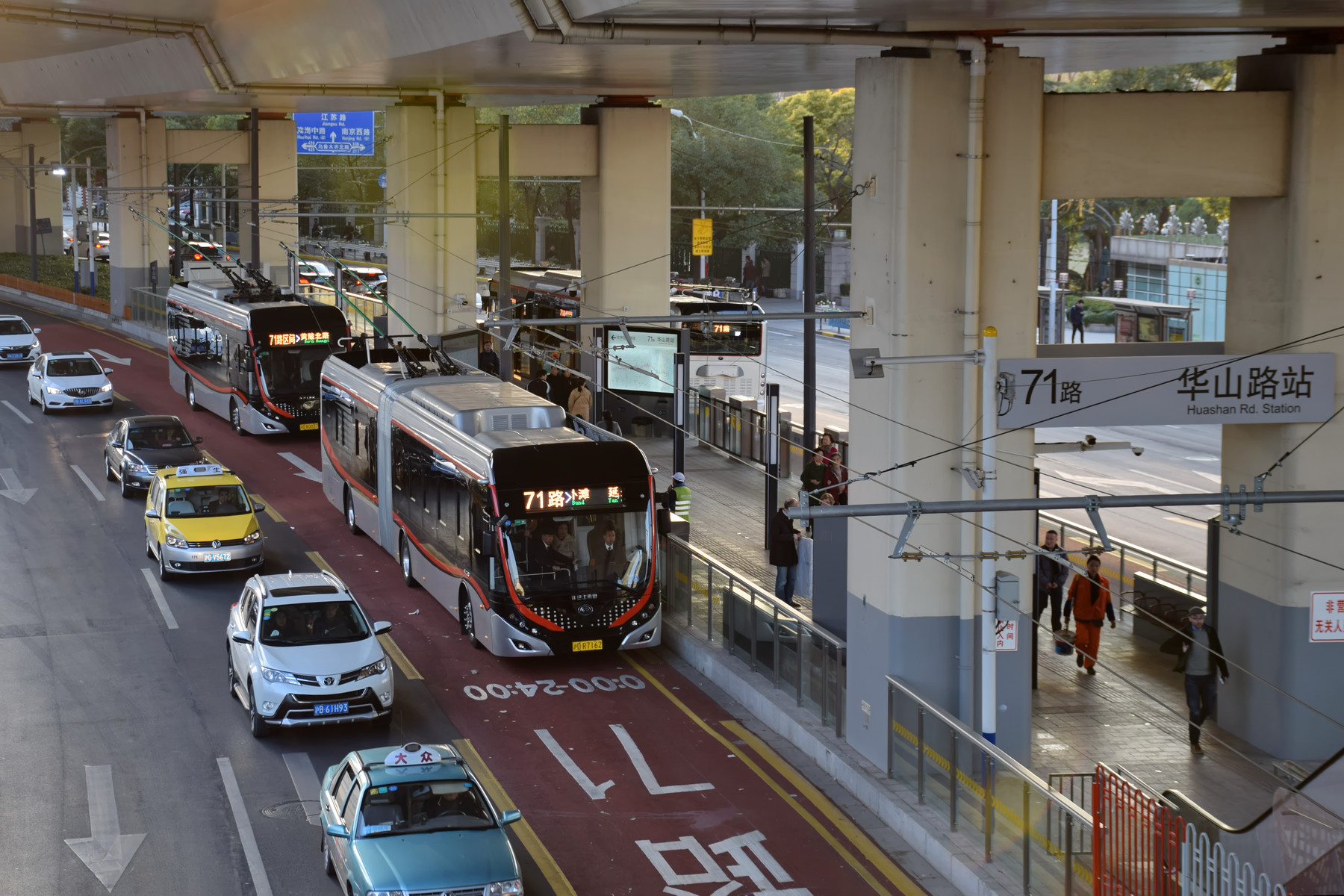
eBRT running under the Yan'an Elevated Road

In 1989, the Yan'an Road East Tunnel was built, connecting Yan'an Road to Lujiazui in Pudong, on the east side of the Huangpu River.

Between 1995 and 1997, an elevated expressway was built along Yan'an Road, as the east–west axis of an urban elevated expressway network, beginning in the west at Hongqiao Airport and ending in the east with a left turn down a ramp onto the surface road of the Bund. In 2008, to improve the streetscape in this part of the city, the easternmost section of the expressway, from just east of the Shanghai Natural History Museum to the Bund, was demolished, replaced in part by the Bund Tunnel, a tunnel via which cars were funneled into a new underground roadway under the Bund.

In 2017, a bus rapid transit line called Yan'an Road Medium Capacity Transit System (Route 71) opened along 17.5 km (10.9 mi) of Yan'an Road with 25 stops. The line is operated with trolley buses running on dedicated transit lanes along the surface-level roadway (i.e. under the elevated expressway).

== See also ==
- Yan'an Elevated Road
- Bund Tunnel
- East Yan'an Road Tunnel
