= Small Swords Society =

Militant rebel organisation in Qing China (1840-55)

- Traditional Chinese: 小刀會
- Simplified Chinese: 小刀会
Transcriptions
Standard Mandarin
- Hanyu Pinyin: Xiǎodāohuì; Xiǎo Dāo Huì
- Wade–Giles: Hsiao-tao Hui; Hsiao Tao Hui

Small Swords Society or Small Sword Society was a political activist organisation in Shanghai, China, and neighbouring areas amid the Taiping Rebellion, between about 1840 and 1855. Members of the society, rebelling against the Qing dynasty, occupied Shanghai city. Chinese gentry and merchants took refuge in the British and French concessions, which were regarded as the only safe places. The rebels briefly allied with the British forces in the concessions after Qing forces attacked the concessions during the Battle of Muddy Flat. The rebellion and society was annihilated in 1855.

Units were organized hierarchically, with leaders commanding small groups of fighters, similar to modern militia squads.

== History ==
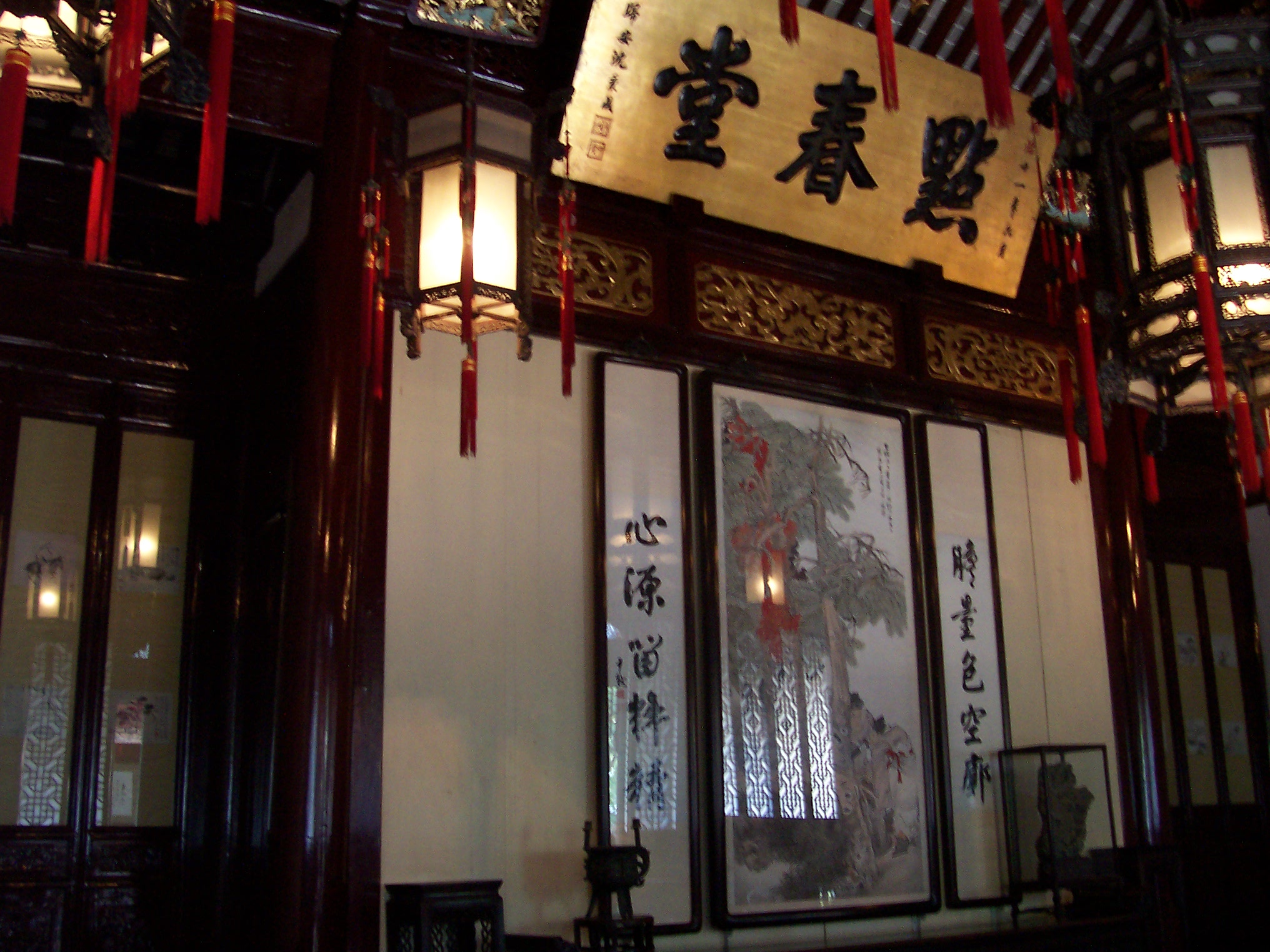
Headquarters of the Small Swords Society in Shanghai

The organization was founded in 1850 during the upheavals leading to the Taiping Rebellion, it was founded in Guangdong and Fujian. (Chinese: 陈庆真), in Xiamen, Fujian Province, many among its leadership being Chinese.

It was one of a number of rebel groups to arise during this period, either affiliated with or proclaiming support for the Taiping administration. The society consisted mainly of natives from Guangdong and Fujian, including Li Shaoqing, Li Xianyun and Pan Yiguo, directors of some of the huiguan or native place associations of Shanghai. The Small Swords Society was a variant of the Heaven and Earth Societies (Tiandihui) that organised the Red Turban Rebellion in Guangdong province, and used their symbolism.

The Society succeeded in seizing Xiamen, Tong'an, Zhangzhou, and Zhangpu in Fujian province, but was forced to withdraw after heavy fighting, continuing resistance at sea until 1858. While in Xiamen, they allied with forces of the Red Turban Rebellion in Humen to seize the city of Huizhou, near Guangzhou, Guangdong province, helping to galvanise that insurrection.

In 1851 the Society occupied the Chinese city of Shanghai without invading the foreign concessions. The circuit intendant was forced to flee. Large numbers of Chinese refugees from surrounding areas flooded into the foreign concessions in this period, dramatically increasing the population there and giving rise to the prevalent longtang or shikumen-style housing which came to dominate Shanghai by the early 20th Century.

The Small Sword Society in Shanghai initially declared the re-establishment of Da Ming Guo (Chinese: 大明国), the Great Ming State, and elected Liu Lichuan as leader, who wrote to the Heavenly King of the Taiping Tianguo to join his rebellion, subsequently adopting the Taiping Tianguo name. The society took steps to issue currency, encourage trade and stabilise the food supply.

Conflict broke out between the Fujian and Guangdong factions. At first, the British and American authorities remained neutral, while the French supported the imperial government.

When the French troops were sent in to support Qing imperial troops. The British and American authorities then declared The Small Sword Society actions illegal and joined in support for the imperial armies.

The society's forces tried to break out from the siege but was annihilated in 1855.

The Society's headquarters were in the Yu Garden of Shanghai, at the heart of the old city and today a popular tourist attraction and shopping district. There is a small museum displaying artefacts of the Society in the gardens.
