= North Pacific Exploring and Surveying Expedition =

United States scientific and exploring project from 1853 to 1856

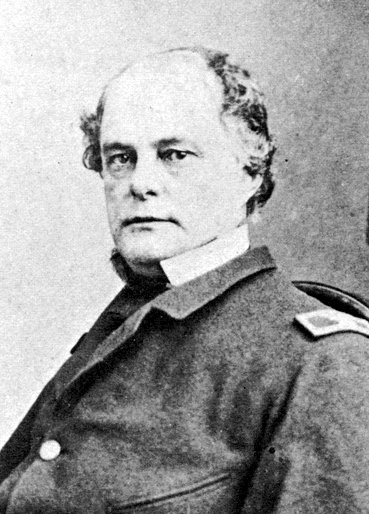
John Rodgers

The North Pacific Exploring and Surveying Expedition, also known as the Rodgers-Ringgold Expedition, was a United States scientific and exploring project from 1853 to 1856.

Commander Cadwalader Ringgold (1802–1867) led the expedition until he was relieved of command in Hong Kong by a commission convened by Commodore Matthew Perry. Lt. John Rodgers (1812–1882) then commanded the expedition until its conclusion.

== The expedition under Ringgold ==
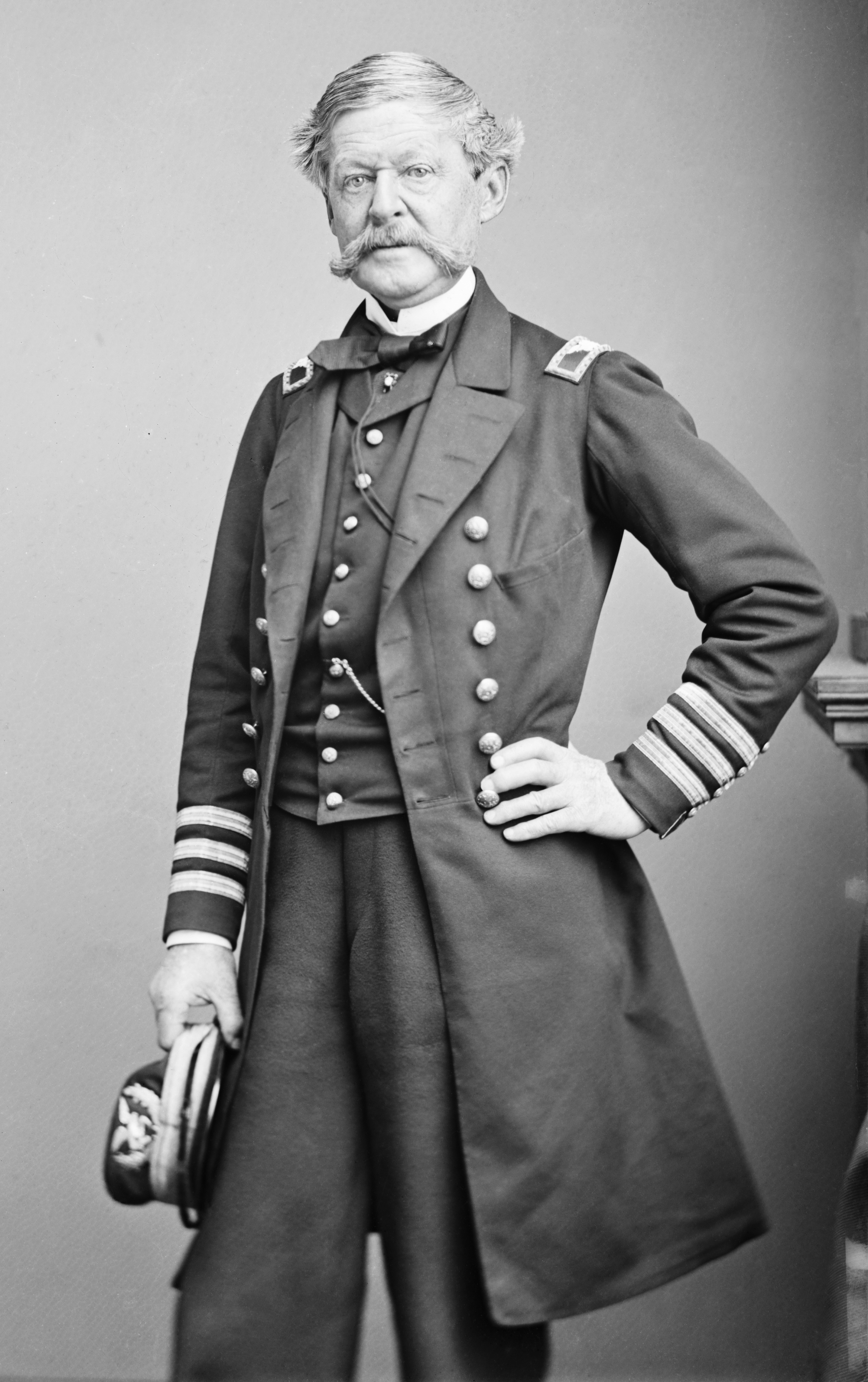
Cadwalader Ringgold

Ringgold sailed on USS Porpoise, a ship he had commanded during the U.S. Exploring Expedition years before. USS John Hancock, commanded by Lt. John Rodgers and three other vessels including USS Vincennes would be the other vessels in the expedition.

Porpoise joined the squadron at Hampton Roads, and with it, stood out to sea 11 June 1853. After stopping at Funchal, Madeira Islands; Porto Praya; and Simonstown, False Bay; the expedition arrived in Batavia, Dutch East Indies, on the island of Java, on 12 December, and in China in March 1854.

Five months were devoted to surveying the waters surrounding the large islands off the coast of Southeast Asia. Early in May 1854, John Hancock, with Rodgers commanding, departed for Hong Kong, where she arrived 24 May. The squadron operated from that port as its base throughout the summer, surveying nearby coasts, islands and rivers. At this time China was plagued by rebellion and pirates endangering foreigners and threatening their property. The American ships helped protect American citizens and interests. While steaming up the Canton River, two armed boats from John Hancock were fired upon by rebel batteries, which Hancock's cannon promptly silenced.

== From Hong Kong to the United States ==
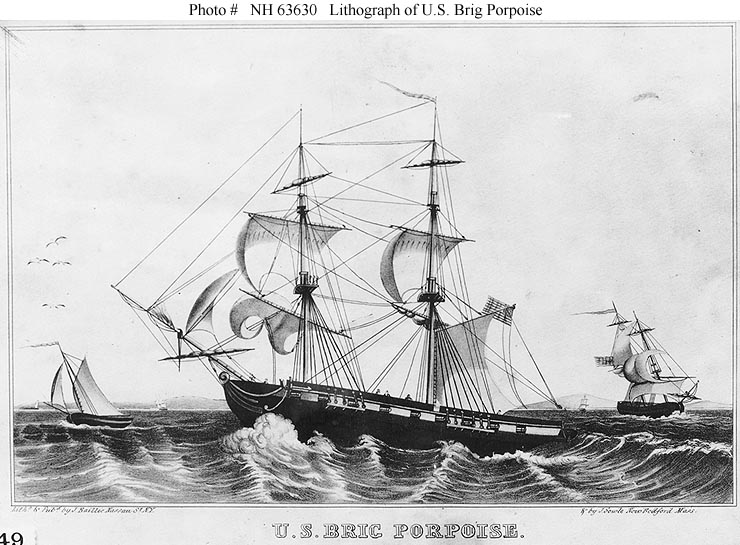
USS Porpoise

In July 1854, Ringgold became sick with malaria and was sent home, according to at least one source. However, Nathaniel Philbrick, in his book "Sea of Glory" about the U.S. Exploring Expedition, writes that in the later expedition Ringgold "began to act strangely" once in China, keeping his ships in port "ceaselessly repairing his vessels". Commodore Perry, on his own expedition, sailed in and convened an official panel which relieved Ringgold from command of the expedition and sent him home. Philbrick quotes Perry as declaring Ringgold "insane." John Rodgers was given full command of the expedition and completed it.

The squadron headed north along the coast as far as the Bering Sea, surveying as it went. The squadron at that time also explored islands well off the coast of Asia, including the Bonins, the Ladrones, and the Marianas. Porpoise parted company with the other vessels 21 September 1854 between Formosa and China, and was never heard from again. It is supposed that she foundered in a heavy typhoon which occurred a few days after her separation from the squadron.

At the Bering sea, the expedition turned south along the western coast of North America. In March 1856, the expedition arrived at Puget Sound to help suppress Indian uprisings which threatened to wipe out white settlements and Army outposts established in the early 1850s.

== Results of the expedition ==
Besides greatly increasing knowledge of the western and northern Pacific, stimulating commerce, and easing navigation in previously unknown seas, the expedition has been credited with helping to establish friendly relations between the United States and several nations of East Asia.

== See also ==
United States Exploring Expedition

Battle of Muddy Flat

Canton Factories

Century of humiliation

Gunboat diplomacy

Pirates of the South China Coast

Yangtze Patrol
