= British concession of Shanghai =

British concession in Shanghai during the Qing Empire

British Concession in Shanghai
- Foreign Enclave
- 1845–1863
- Flag Emblem

Anthem
- "God Save the King"
- History
  - Established: 1845
  - Disestablished: 1863
| Preceded by | Succeeded by |
| Shanghai County | Shanghai International Settlement |

The British Concession or Settlement was a foreign enclave (a "concession") in Shanghai within the Qing Empire which existed from around 1845 until its unification with the American area, located directly north of it across Suzhou Creek to form the Shanghai International Settlement in 1863.

The settlement was bordered to the north by the right bank of Suzhou Creek at its confluence with the Huangpu River, to the east by the Huangpu itself, and to south by the former Yangjing Creek, now Yan'an Road, which would be the future boundary with the French Concession.

1884 map of Shanghai with foreign concessions: the British Concession in blue, the French Concession to the south in faded red and American Concession to the north in faded orange; Chinese part of the city to the south of the French Concession in faded yellow.

== History ==
The British occupied Shanghai during the First Opium War and it was opened to foreign trade by the terms of the Treaty of Nanking. The British settlement was established by the 1845 Land Regulations, undertaken on the initiative of the intendant Gong Mujiu. On 20 November 1846, a formal concession was established; this was expanded on 27 November 1848. After a proposal to make Shanghai an independent "free city" was rejected in 1862, the British area agreed to merge with the American on 21 September 1863 as the Shanghai International Settlement. This occurred in December of the same year.

== See also ==
- Shanghai International Settlement
- American Concession (Shanghai)
- Shanghai French Concession
- List of former foreign enclaves in China
