= Yantai =

Yantai 烟台市 Chefoo, Yentai
- Prefecture-level city
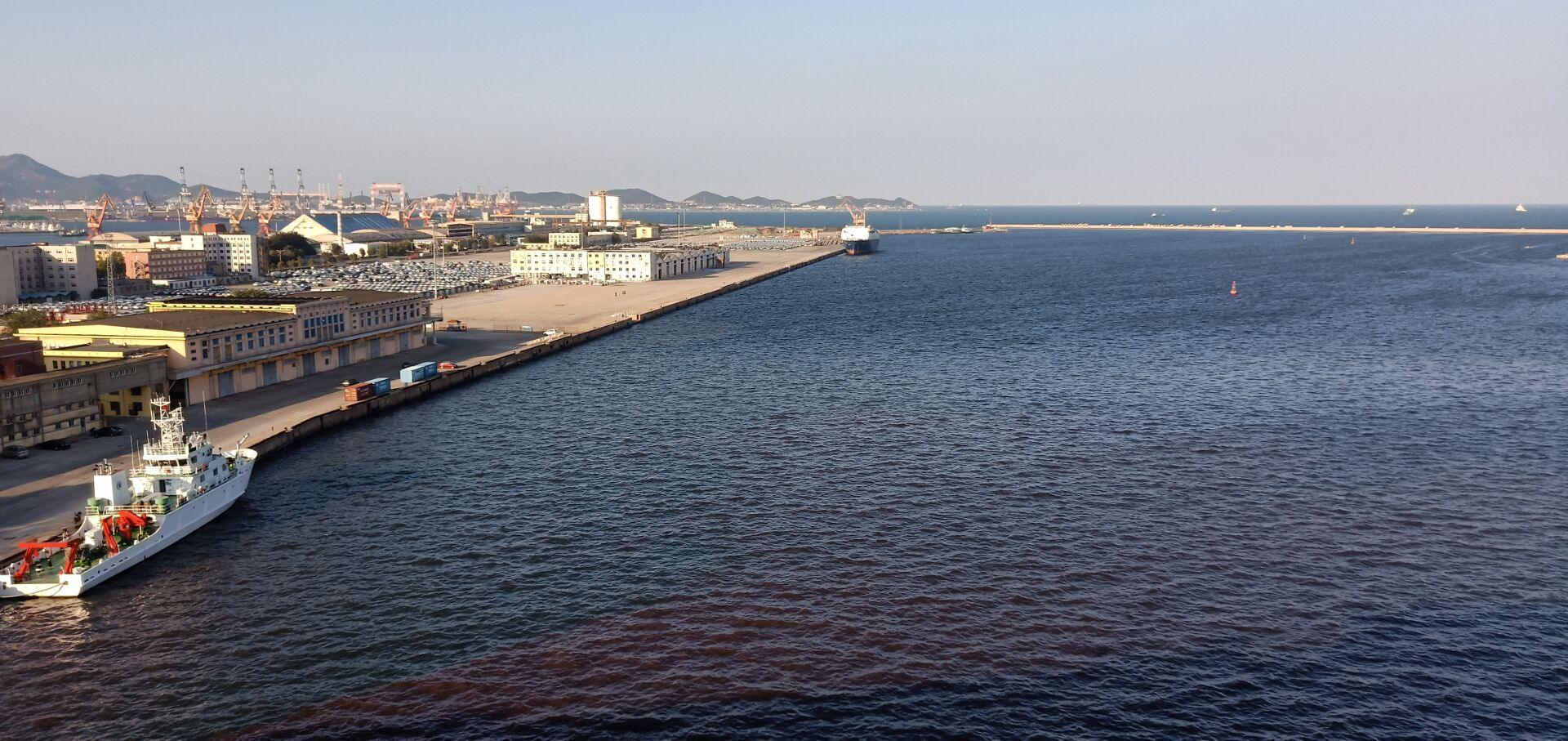
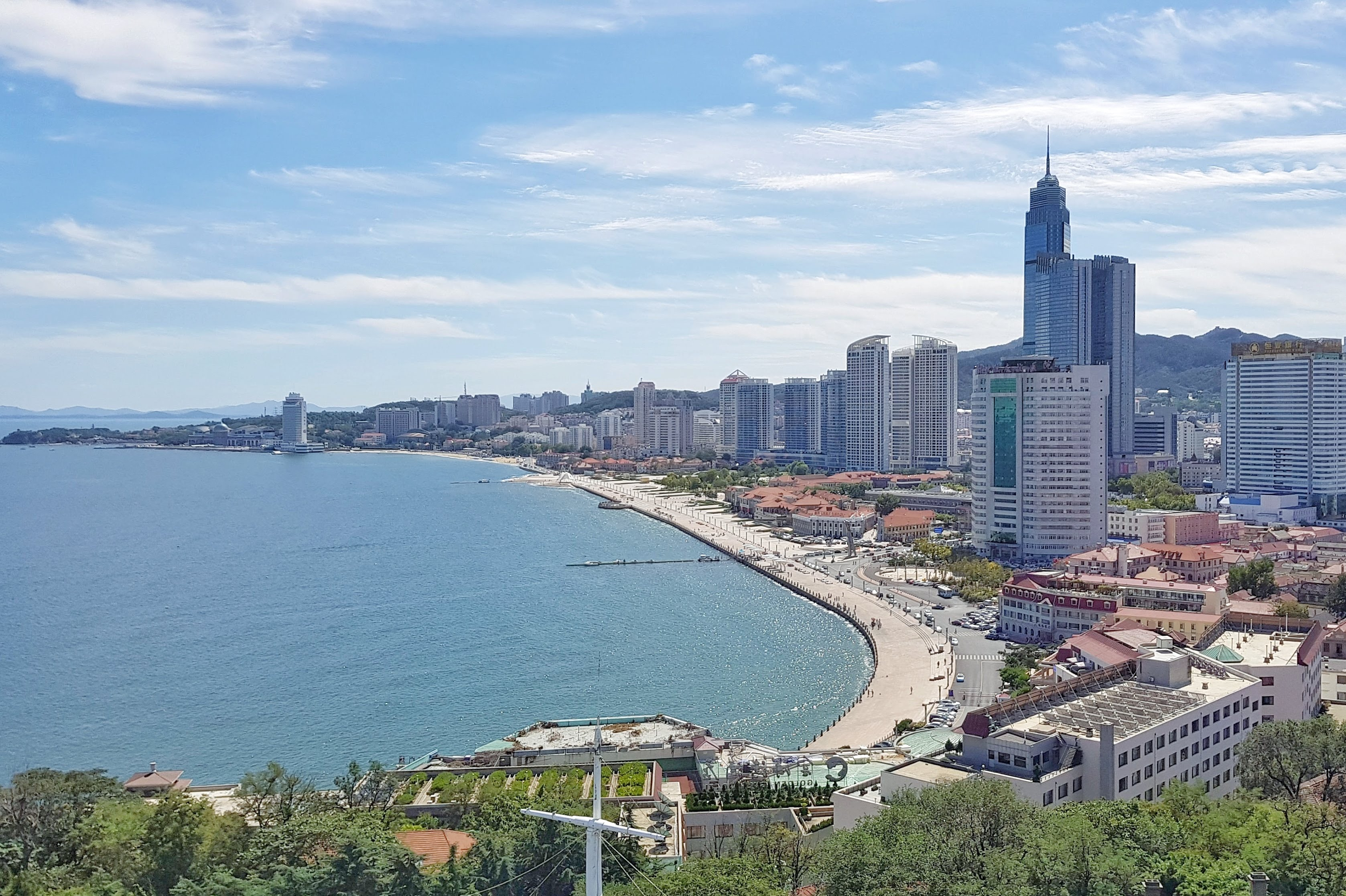
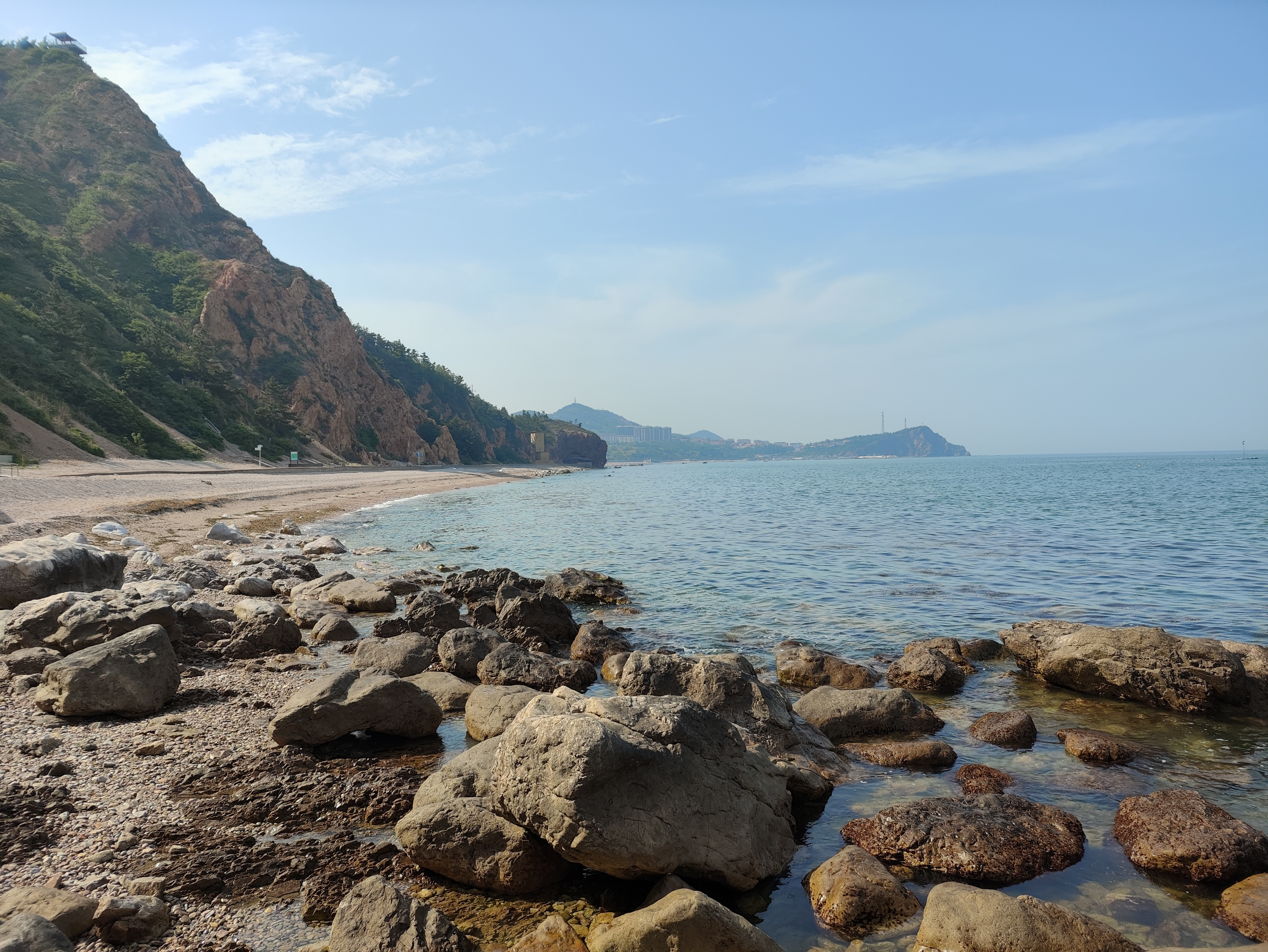
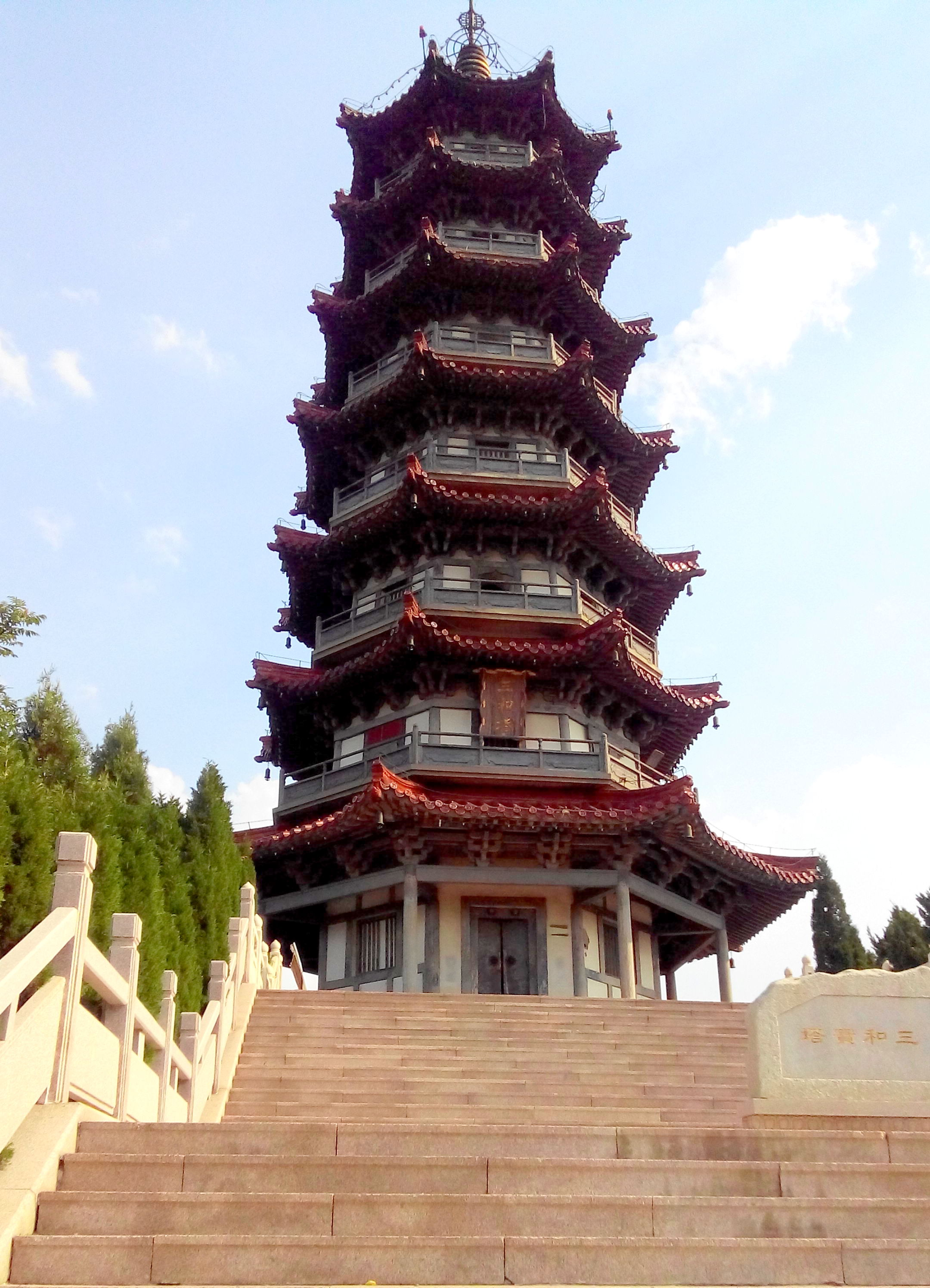
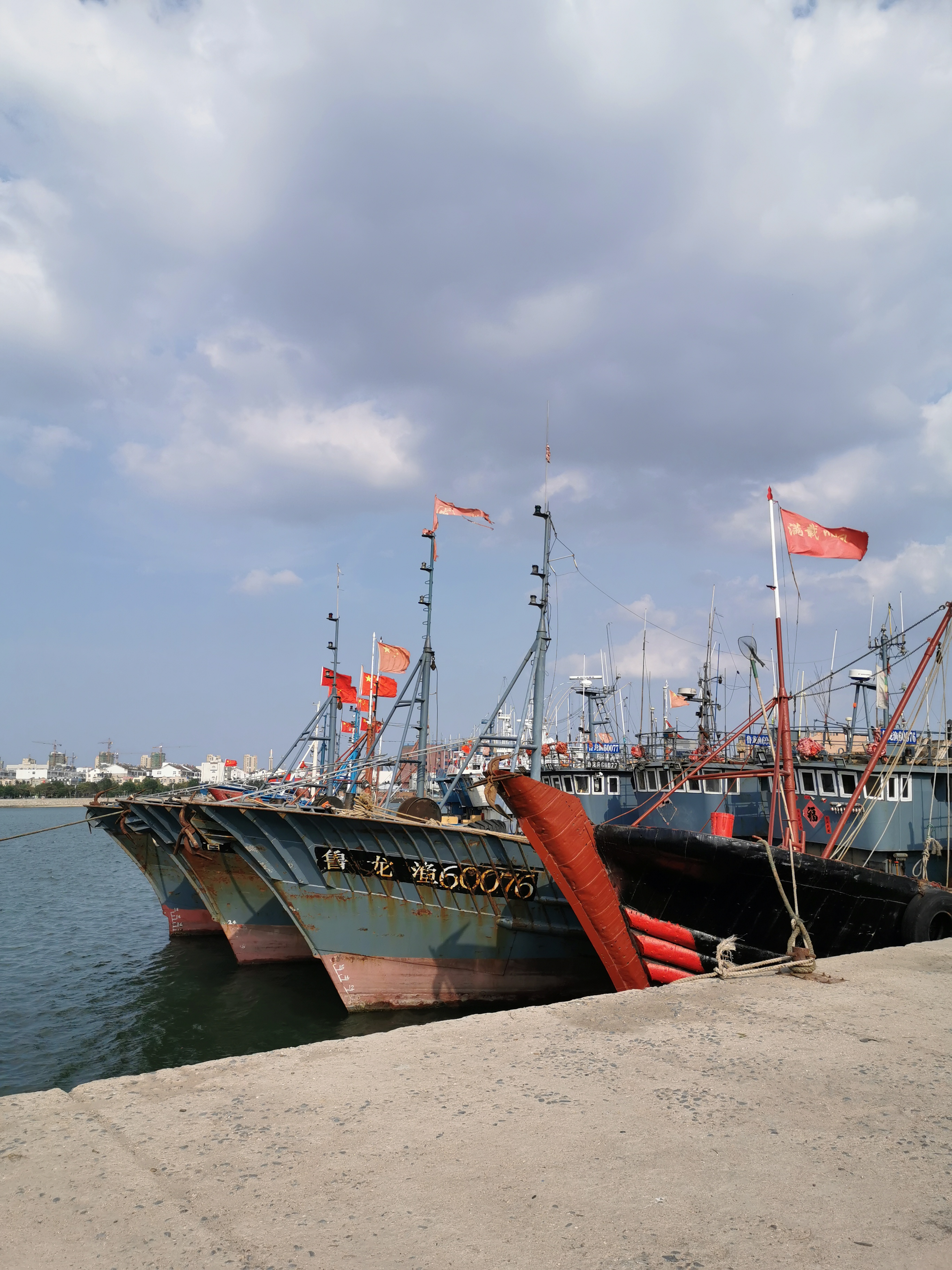
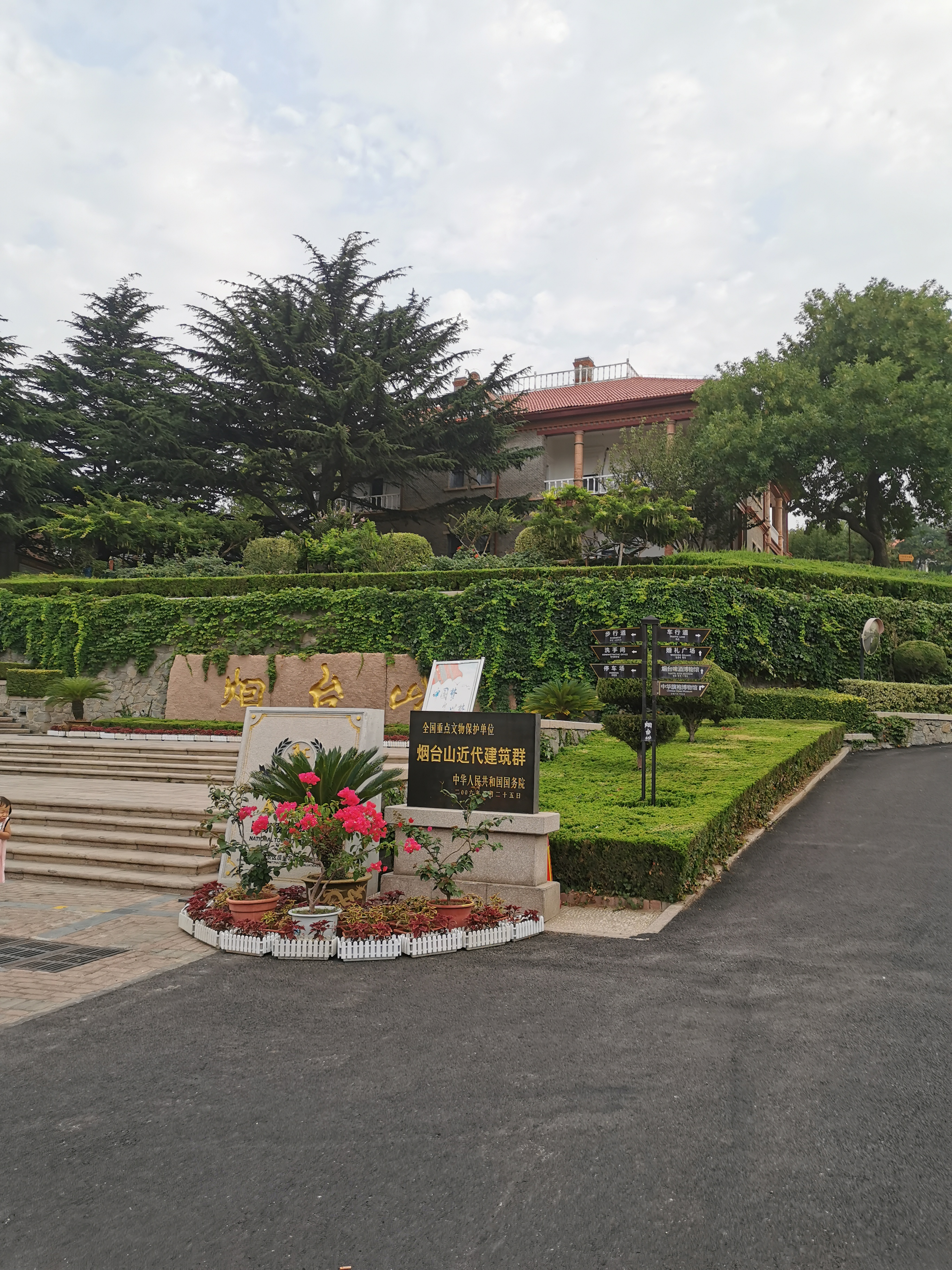
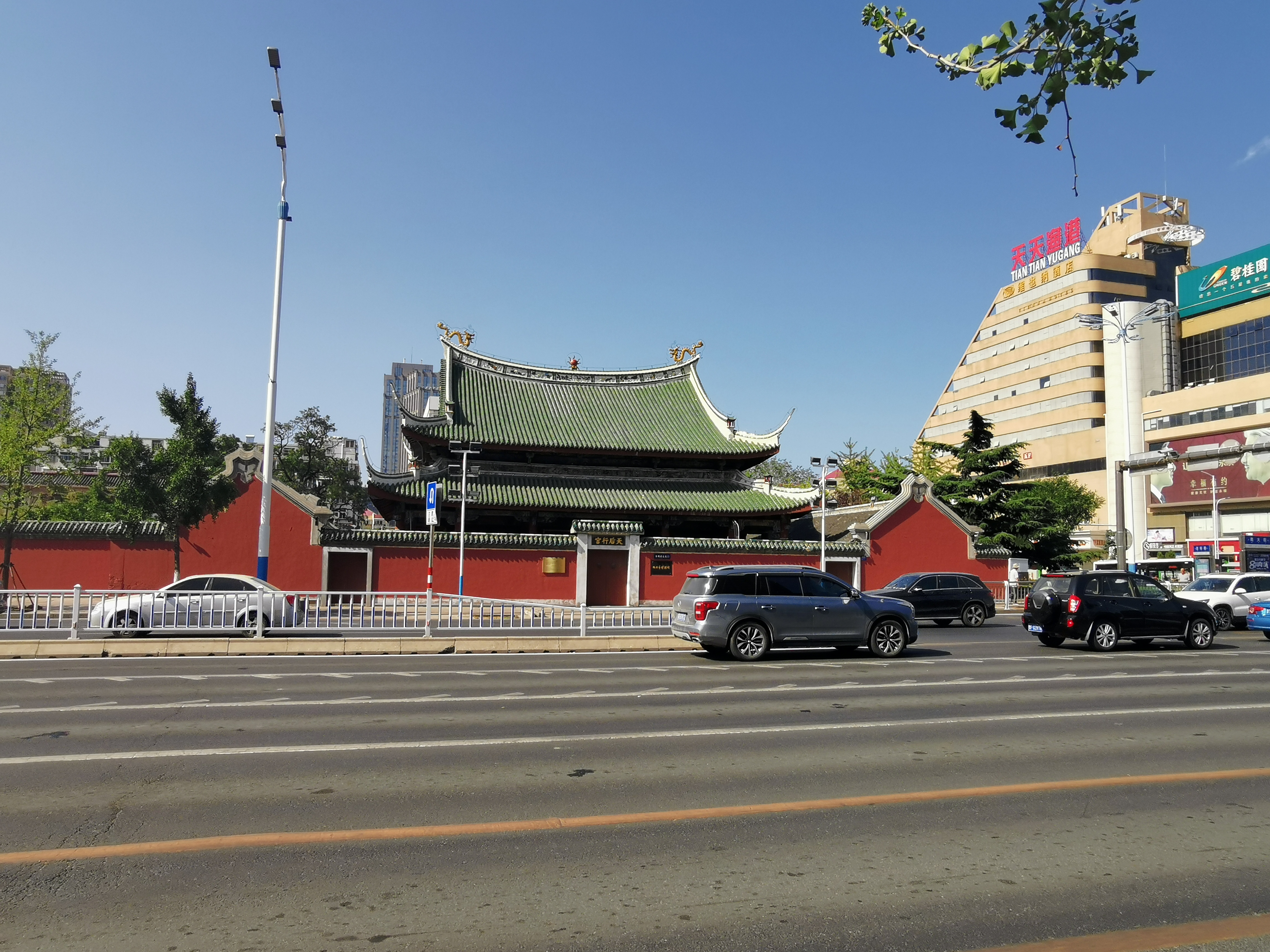
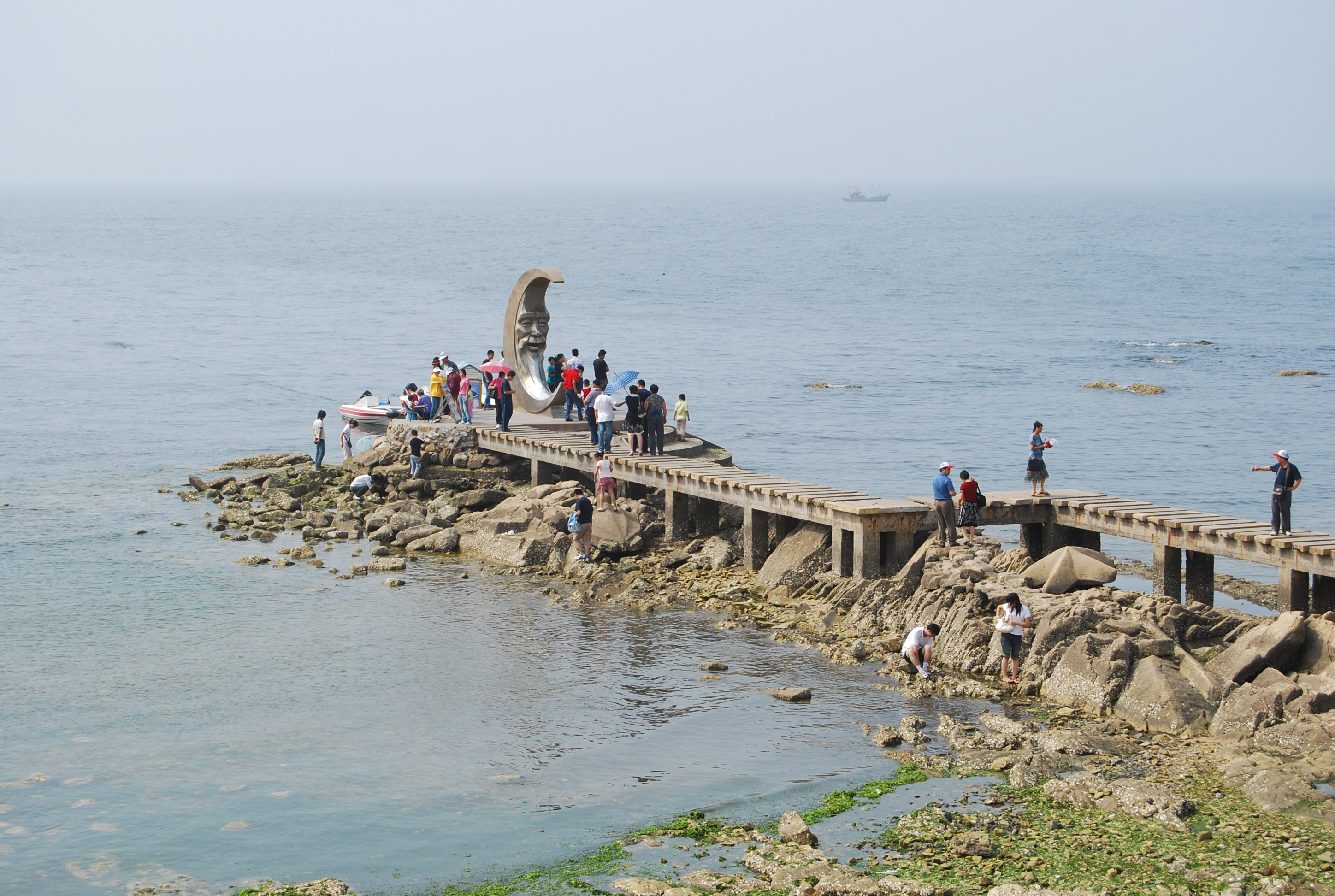
- Port of Yantai Downtown Yantai Changdao Islands Three Harmony Taoism Pagoda Port in Longkou Yantai Hill Scenic Area Tianhou Temple Moon Bay

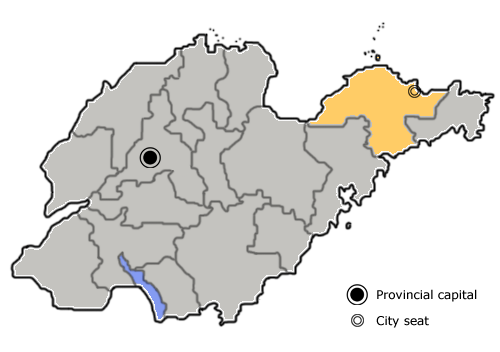
- Location of Yantai City Jurisdiction in Shandong

- Location in China
- Coordinates (Yantai Museum): 37°32′14″N 121°23′36″E
- Country: People's Republic of China
- Province: Shandong
- County-level divisions: 12
- Townships-level divisions: 148
- Settled as a barrack: 1398
- Open as a trade port (CHEFOO): August 22, 1861
- Settled as a city: January 19, 1938
- Settled as a prefecture level city: August 30, 1983
- Municipal seat: Laishan District

Government
  - CPC Secretary: Jiang Cheng (江成)
  - Mayor: Zheng Deyan (郑德雁)

Area
  - Prefecture-level city: 13,739.9 km^{2} (5,305.0 sq mi)

Population (2023 census)
  - Prefecture-level city: 7,102,100
  - Density: 516.90/km^{2} (1,338.8/sq mi)
  - Urban: 4,233,100
  - Metro: 2,264,554

GDP
  - Prefecture-level city: CN¥ 1.1351 trillion US$ 165.3 billion
  - Per capita: CN¥ 161,300; US$ 22,600
- Time zone: UTC+8 (China Standard)
- Postal code: 264000-265800
- Area code: 535
- ISO 3166 code: CN-SD-06
- License Plate: 鲁F & 鲁Y
- Website: www.yantai.gov.cn

Yantai
- Simplified Chinese: 烟台
- Traditional Chinese: 煙臺
- Hanyu Pinyin: Yāntái
- Literal meaning: "Smoke Tower"
Transcriptions
Standard Mandarin
- Hanyu Pinyin: Yāntái
- Wade–Giles: Yan^{1}-t'ai^{2}
- IPA: [jɛ́ntʰǎɪ]

Former names
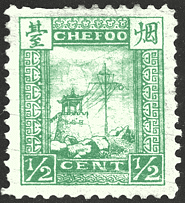
- postage stamp of Chefoo

Zhifu
- Chinese: 芝罘
- Hanyu Pinyin: Zhīfú
- Postal: Chefoo
Transcriptions
Standard Mandarin
- Hanyu Pinyin: Zhīfú

Yantai, formerly Chefoo, is a coastal prefecture-level city on the Shandong Peninsula in China. Lying on the southern coast of the Bohai Strait, Yantai borders Qingdao on the southwest and Weihai on the east, with sea access to both the Bohai Sea (via the Laizhou Bay and the Bohai Strait) and the Yellow Sea (from both north and south sides of the Shandong Peninsula). It is the largest fishing seaport in Shandong. Its population was 7,102,116 during the 2020 census, of whom 3,184,299 lived in the built-up area made up of the 5 urban districts of Zhifu, Laishan, Fushan, Muping, and Penglai.

== Names ==
The name Yantai (lit. "Smoke Watchtower") derives from the watchtowers constructed on Mount Qi (奇山所城) in 1398 by locals. The towers were used to light signal fires and send smoke signals, called langyan from their supposed use of wolf dung for fuel. At the time, the area was troubled by the Japanese pirates, initially raiders from the warring states in Japan but later principally disaffected Chinese.

The major district of Yantai is Zhifu, formerly the largest city therein was then romanized as Chefoo, (Note: Postal Map Romanization) Che-foo, Chi-fu, among others possible variants. Although this name was used for the city by the Europeans prior to the Communist victory in the Chinese Civil War, the locals referred to the settlement as Yantai throughout.

== History ==
=== Early history ===
During the Xia and Shang dynasties, the region was inhabited by indigenous people vaguely known to the Chinese as the "Eastern Barbarians" (Dongyi). Under the Zhou, they were colonized and sinicized as the state of Lai. Lai was annexed by Qi in 567 BC.

Under the First Emperor (Shi Huangdi), the area was administered as the Qi Commandery. In 218 BCE, during his eastern inspection tour, Emperor Qin Shi Huang visited Zhifu Island, leaving behind the Zhifu Stone Inscription and establishing the Eastern Inspection Palace. The stone inscription later fell into the sea and was lost, though 14 characters survive today through ink rubbings. The Eastern Inspection Palace was demolished in 1966 during Cultural Revolution. Under the Han, this was renamed as the Donglai Commandery (東萊郡). Following the Three Kingdoms period, the area was organized by the Jin as the Donglai Kingdom or Principality, later returning to prefecture status as a jùn and then zhōu. Under the Tang and during the Five Dynasties and Ten Kingdoms period, it was known as Deng Prefecture and organized with the Henan Circuit. It was then organized as the Laizhou (萊州府) and then the Dengzhou Prefecture (登州府).

Up to the 19th century, however, the Zhifu area close to Yantai city consisted of nothing but small unwalled fishing villages of little importance. Under the Ming dynasty, these were first troubled by the Wokou and then by the overreacting "Sea Ban", which required coastal Chinese to give up trading and most fishing and relocate inland upon pain of death.

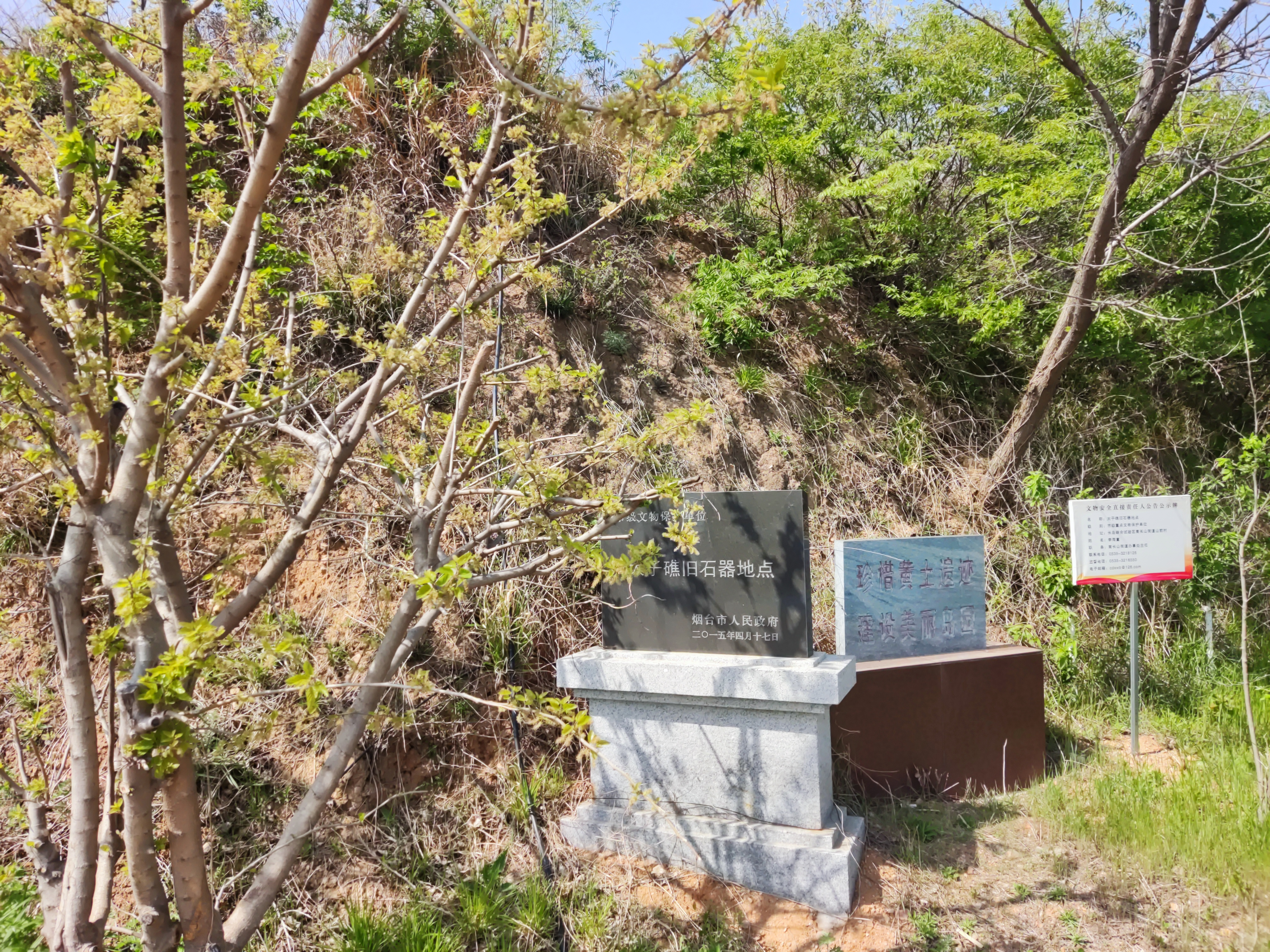
Paleolithic settlement site on Changshan Islands

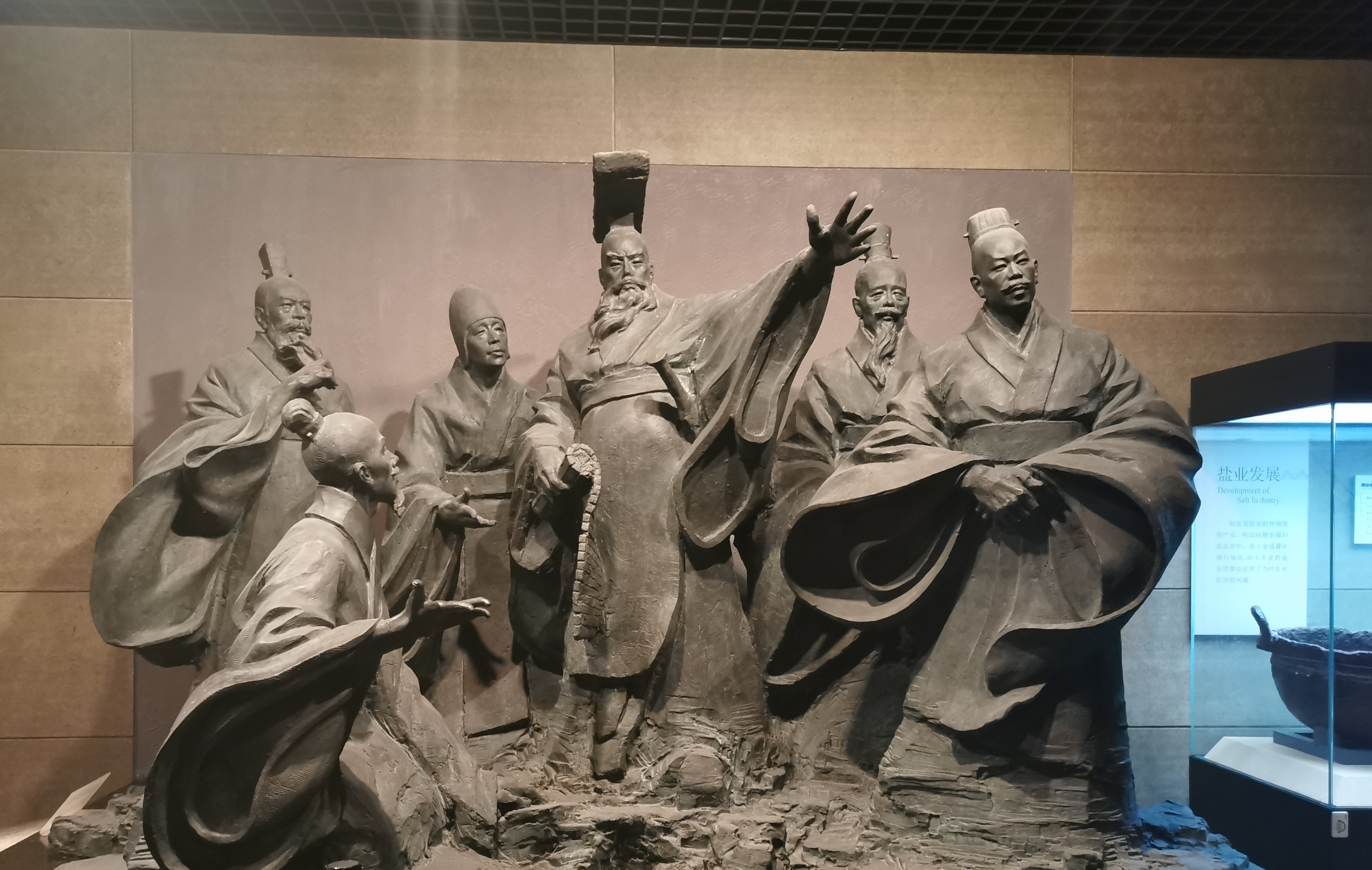
Qin Shi Huang visited Zhifu in 218 BCE

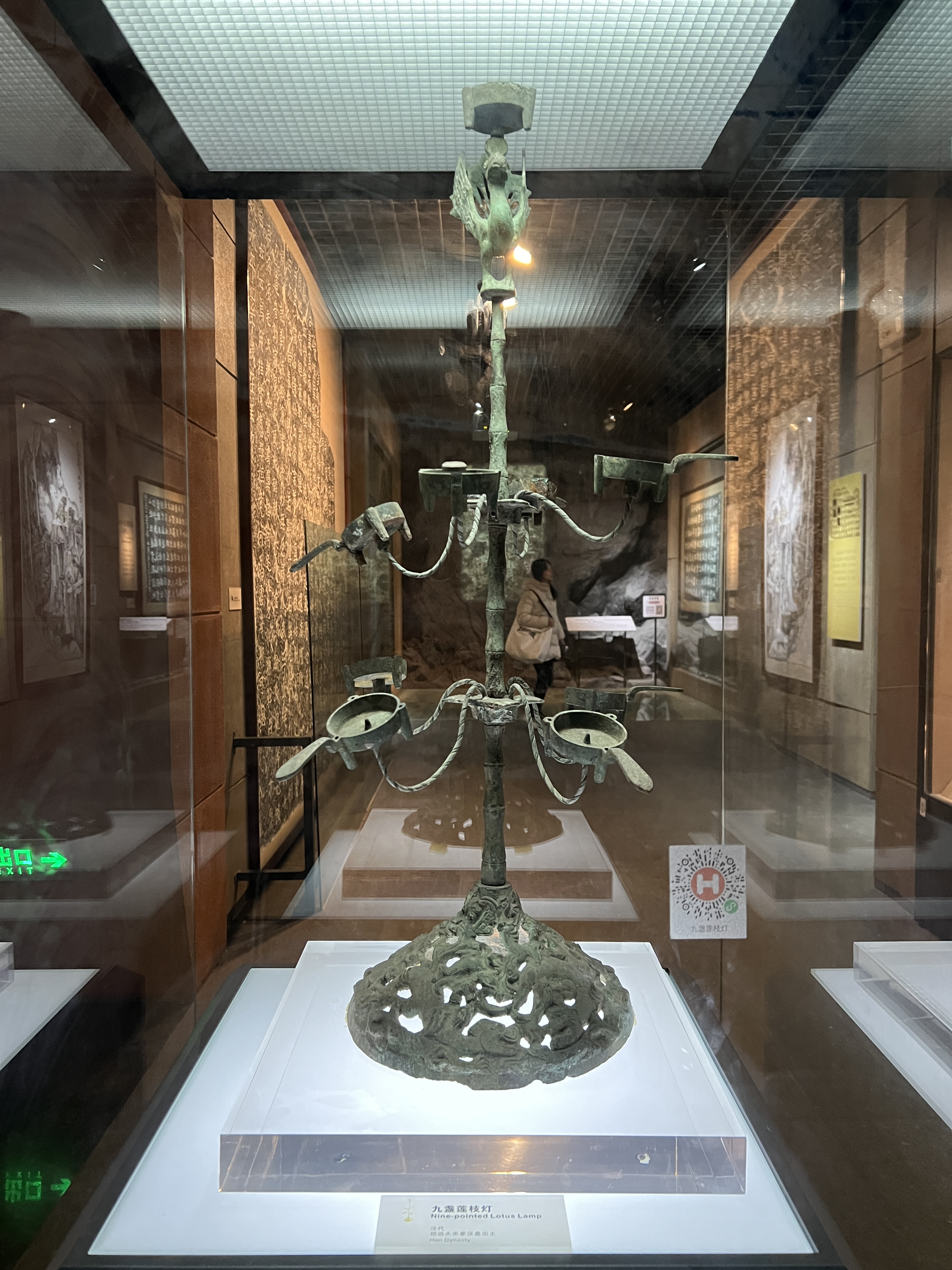
Han dynasty lotus lamp

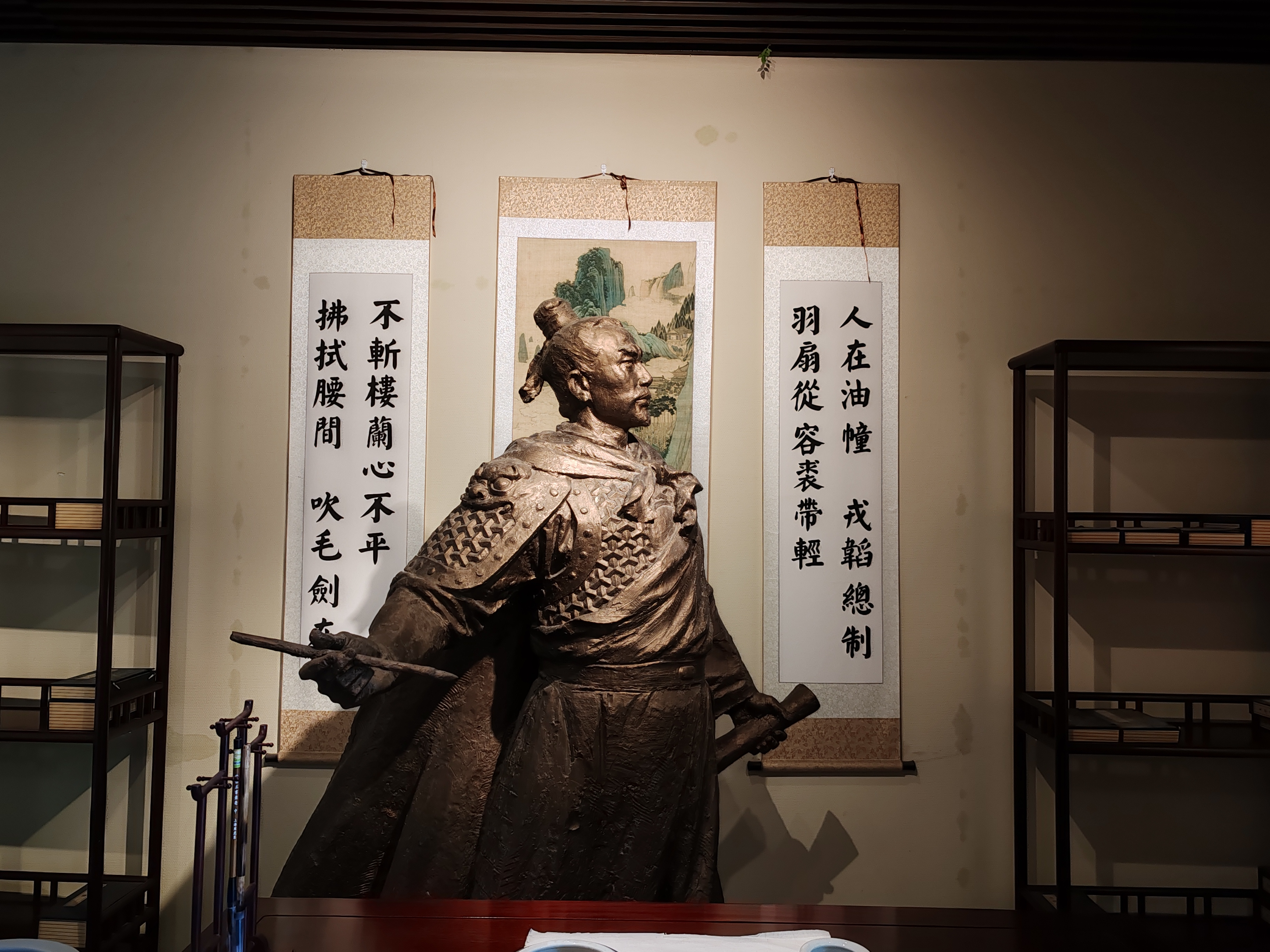
Statue of Qi Jiguang in Penglai, who used to serve as the military commander in this region

=== Opening as a port ===
Following the Second Opium War, the Qing regime was obliged to open more ports by the Europeans, including Tengchow Prefecture (now Penglai). Its port being found inadequate, Zhifu—about 30 miles (48 km) away—was selected to act as the seat of the area's foreign commerce. The mooring was at considerable distance from shore, necessitating more time and expense in loading and unloading, but the harbor was deep and expansive and business grew rapidly. The harbor opened in May 1861, with its status as an international port affirmed on August 22. The official decree was accompanied by the construction of the Donghai Customs House (東海關). It quickly became the residence of a circuit intendant ("taotai"), customs house, and a considerable foreign settlement located between the old native town and the harbor. Britain and sixteen other nations established consulates in the town. The town was initially expanded with well-laid streets and well-built stone houses, even for the poorer classes; churches were erected, and a large hotel did business with foreigners who employed the town as a summer resort.

The principal traders were Anglo-American, followed by the Germans and Thais. (Note: In 1872, 233 British vessels entered the port with 97,239 tons of cargo valued at £144,887 and 348 ships of all other nationalities entered with 149,197 tons of cargo valued at £177,168.) In the 1870s, the principal imports were woolen and cotton goods, iron, and opium and the principal exports were tofu, soybean oil, peas, coarse vermicelli, vegetables, and dried fruit from Zhifu itself, raw silk and straw braid from Laizhou, and walnuts from Qingzhou. The town also traded Chinese liquors and sundries for the edible seaweed grown in the shallows of the Russian settlements around Port Arthur (now Dalian's Lüshunkou District). In 1875, the murder of the British diplomat Augustus Margary in Tengchong, Yunnan, led to a diplomatic crisis that was resolved in Zhifu by Thomas Wade and Li Hongzhang the next year. The resultant Chefoo Convention gave British subjects extraterritoriality throughout China and exempted the foreign merchants' enclaves from the likin tax on internal commerce. Its healthy situation and good anchorage made it a favorite coaling station for foreign fleets, giving it some importance in the conflicts over Korea, Port Arthur, and Weihaiwei.

Awardwinning Chefoo bobbin lace was produced following the introduction of the craft by British missionaries, reportedly becoming a popular export. Chefoo lace was exhibited at the 1904 St. Louis World's Fair.

Yantai received German economic activities and investments for about 20 years. In the run-up to the First World War, its trade continued to grow (Note: Total imports and exports were valued at £2,724,000 in 1880, £4,228,000 in 1899, and £4,909,908 in 1904. The 905 vessels in 1895 had a total tonnage of 835,248; the 1842 in 1905 held 1,492,514 tons.) but was limited by the poor roads of the area's hinterland and the necessity of using pack animals for portage. The trade items remained largely the same as before. After the Germans were defeated by Allied forces in World War I, Qingdao and Yantai were occupied by the Japanese, who turned Yantai into a summer station for their Asian fleet. They also set up a trading establishment in the town. The different foreign influences that shaped this city are explored at the Yantai Museum, which used to be a guild hall. However, the city's colorful history has not left a distinctive architectural mark, there has never been a foreign concession, and though there are a few grand 19th-century European buildings, most of the town is of much more recent origin. After 1949, the town's name was changed from Chefoo to Yantai, and it was opened to the world as an ice-free trade port in 1984.

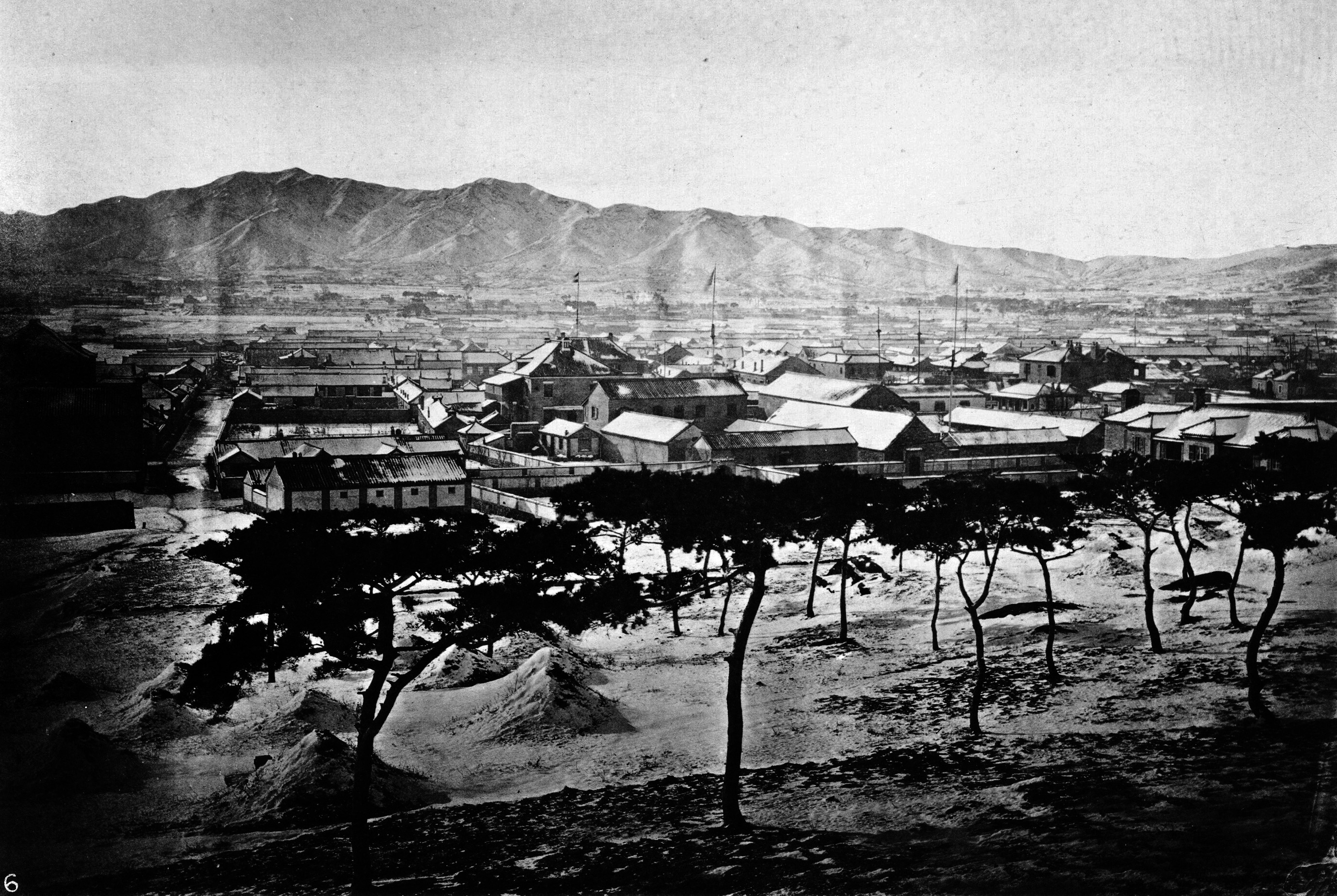
Yantai in 1872

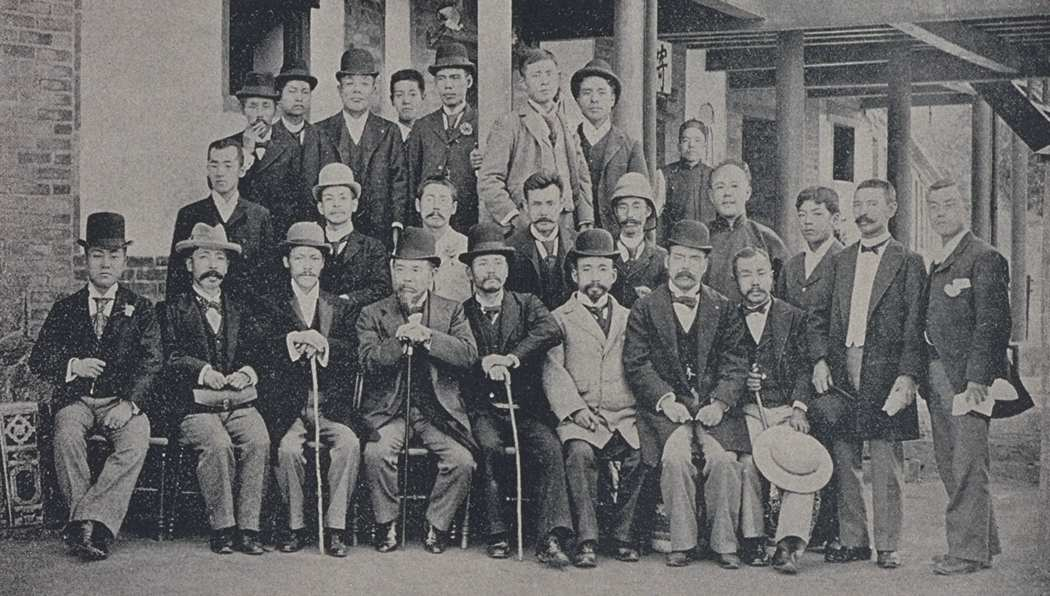
Japanese Prime Minister Itō Hirobumi visiting Yantai in 1898

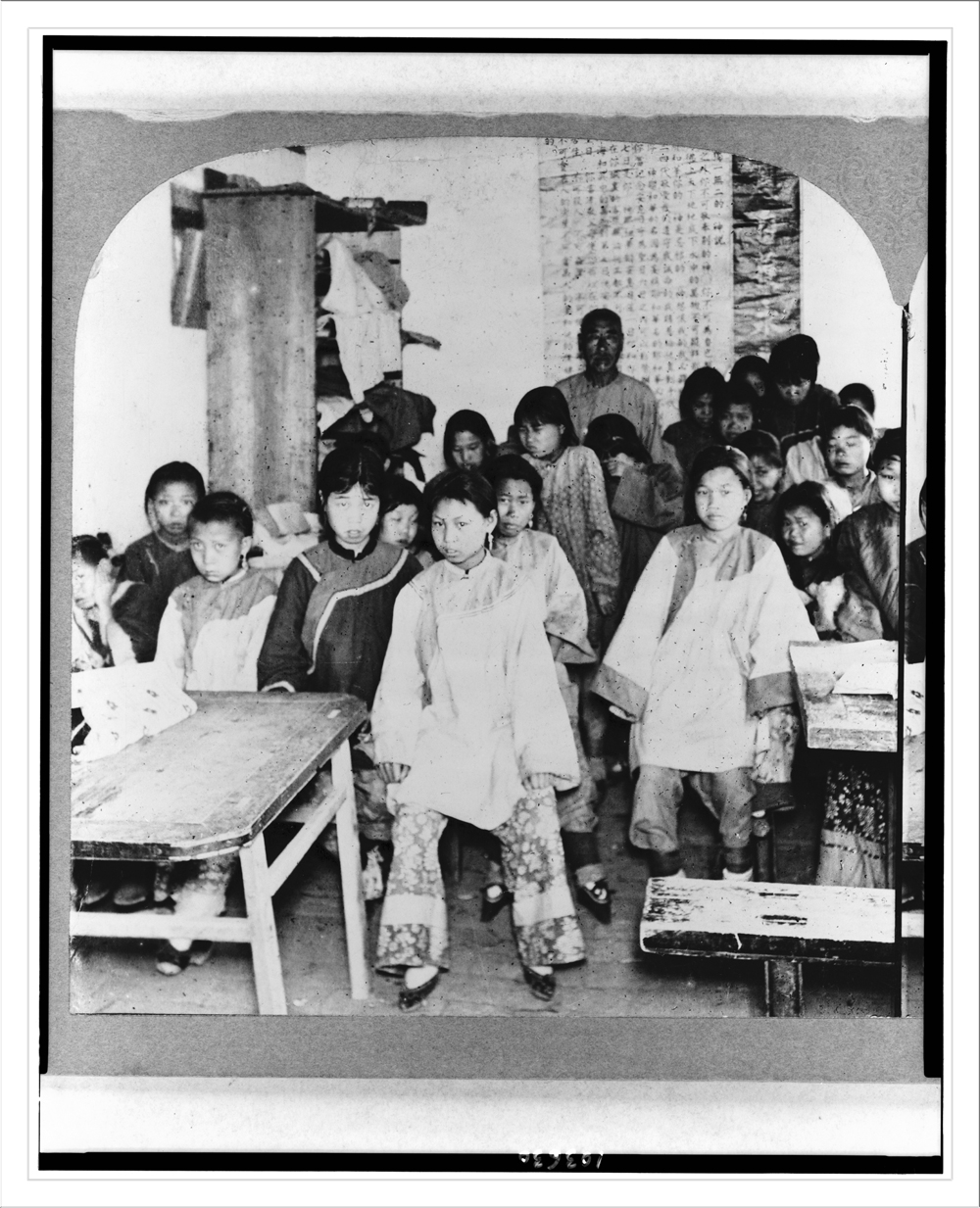
Classroom scene at Chefoo Girls' school, 1902

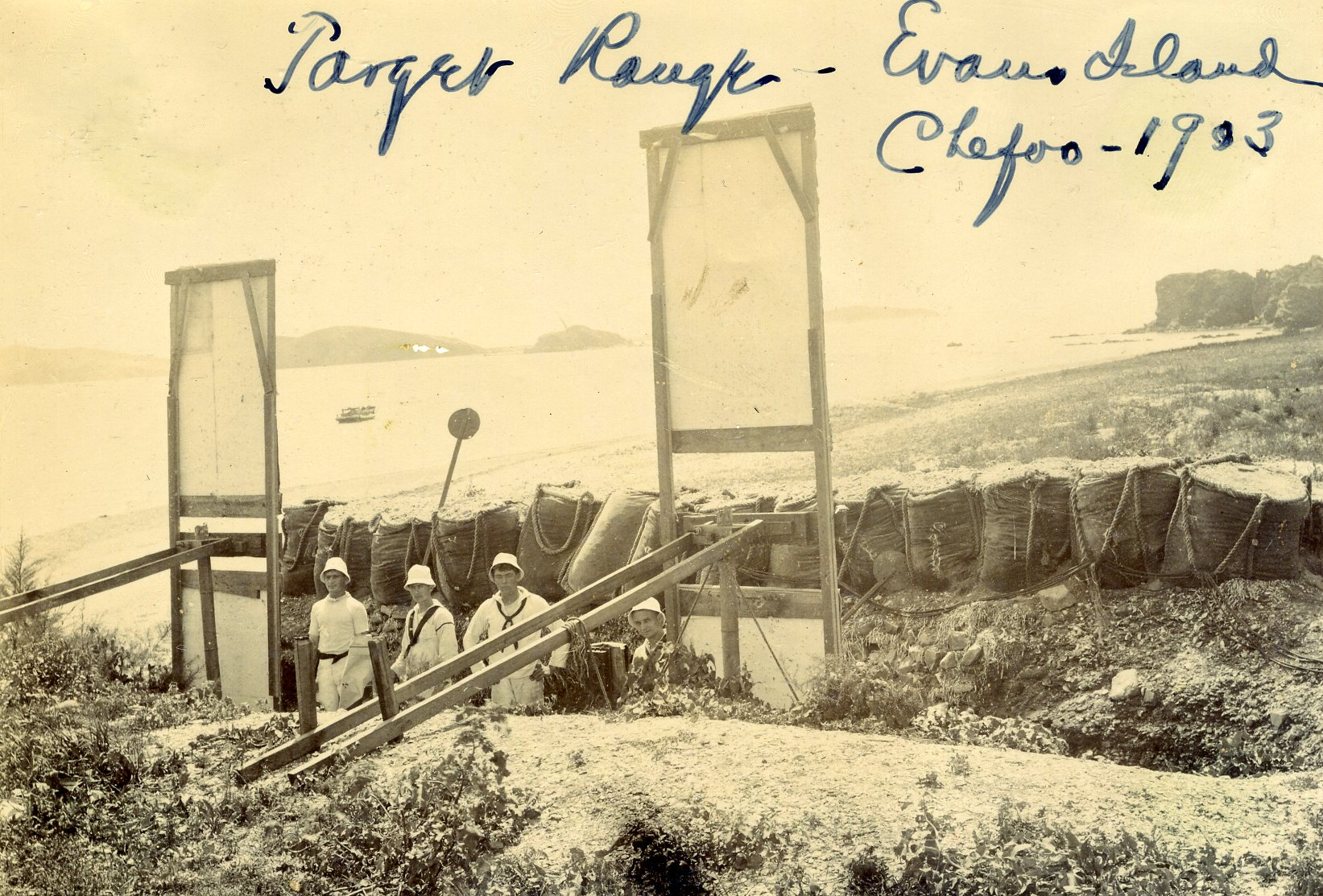
U.S. Navy sailors on Evans Island(崆峒島), 1903

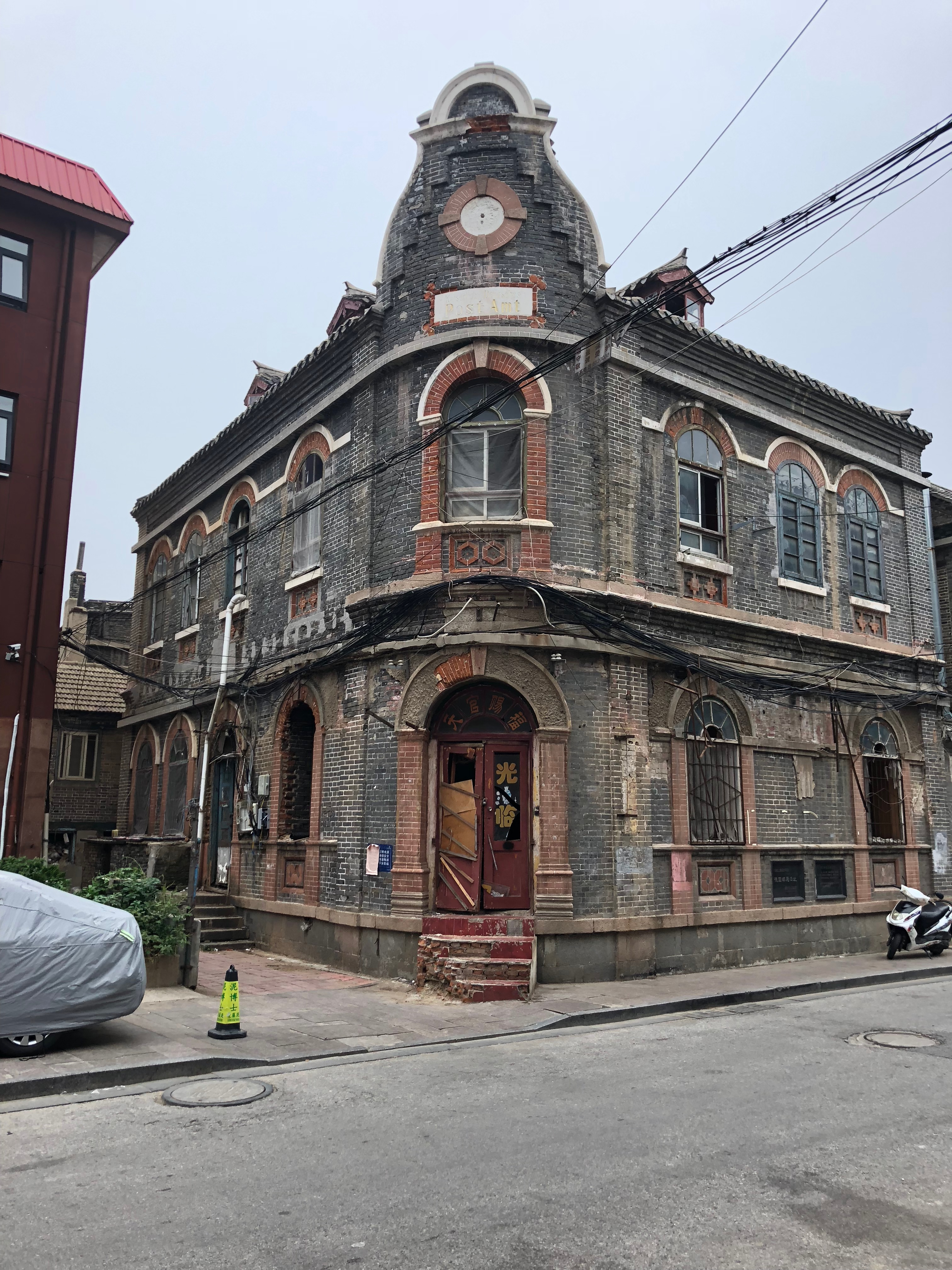
Original German Post Office

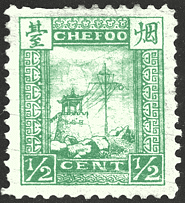
Chefoo Postal Service stamp of the municipal lighthouse

=== ROC era ===
On November 12, 1911, the eastern division of Tongmenghui declared itself a part of the revolutionary movement. The next day, it established the Shandong Military Government (山東軍政府) and, the day after that, renamed itself the Yantai Division of the Shandong Military Government (山東煙臺軍政分府). In 1914, Jiaodong Circuit (膠東道) was established with Yantai as the capital. Jiaodong Circuit was renamed Donghai Circuit (東海道) in 1925.

In 1935, the Xu Minge (徐明娥) Incident sparked massive student demonstrations in Yantai, and on November 29 of the same year, the Jiaodong CCP Special Committee launched the November 4th Uprising, which was subsequently suppressed. On February 3, 1938, Yantai was occupied by the Japanese army, marking the city's first official designation as an urban administrative unit.

After Japan's surrender, the Eighth Route Army took control of Yantai on August 24, 1945, and the Jiaodong Administrative District was established; the Nationalist Government created the provincially administered City of Yantai and appointed Bai Shupu as acting mayor, while in February of the following year, the Communist authorities formed its own concurrent Yantai municipal unit using parts of Fushan and Muping counties. Beginning in September 1947, a series of military engagements between Nationalist and Communist forces erupted across the Jiaodong Peninsula—known historically as the Jiaodong Campaign—and on October 1, the KMT occupied Yantai, with Ding Futing assuming office as mayor. Ultimately, on October 15, 1948, the People's Liberation Army retook Yantai, returning it to the jurisdiction of the Jiaodong Administrative District.

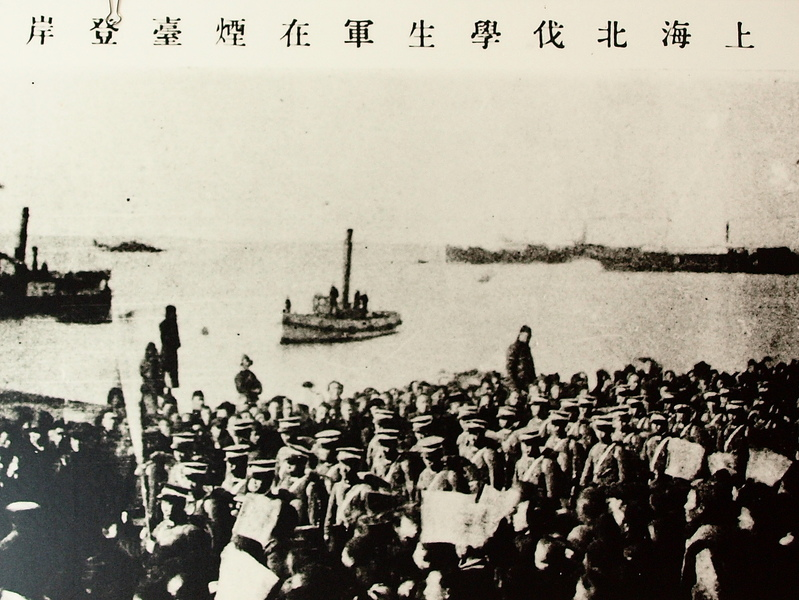
Shanghai Northern Expedition student corps landing in Yantai during the 1911 Revolution

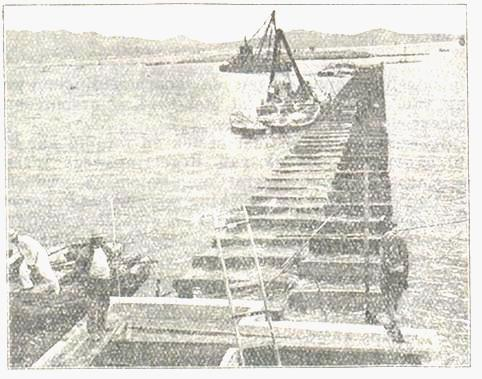
Completion of the East Sea Dam at Yantai Port in 1919

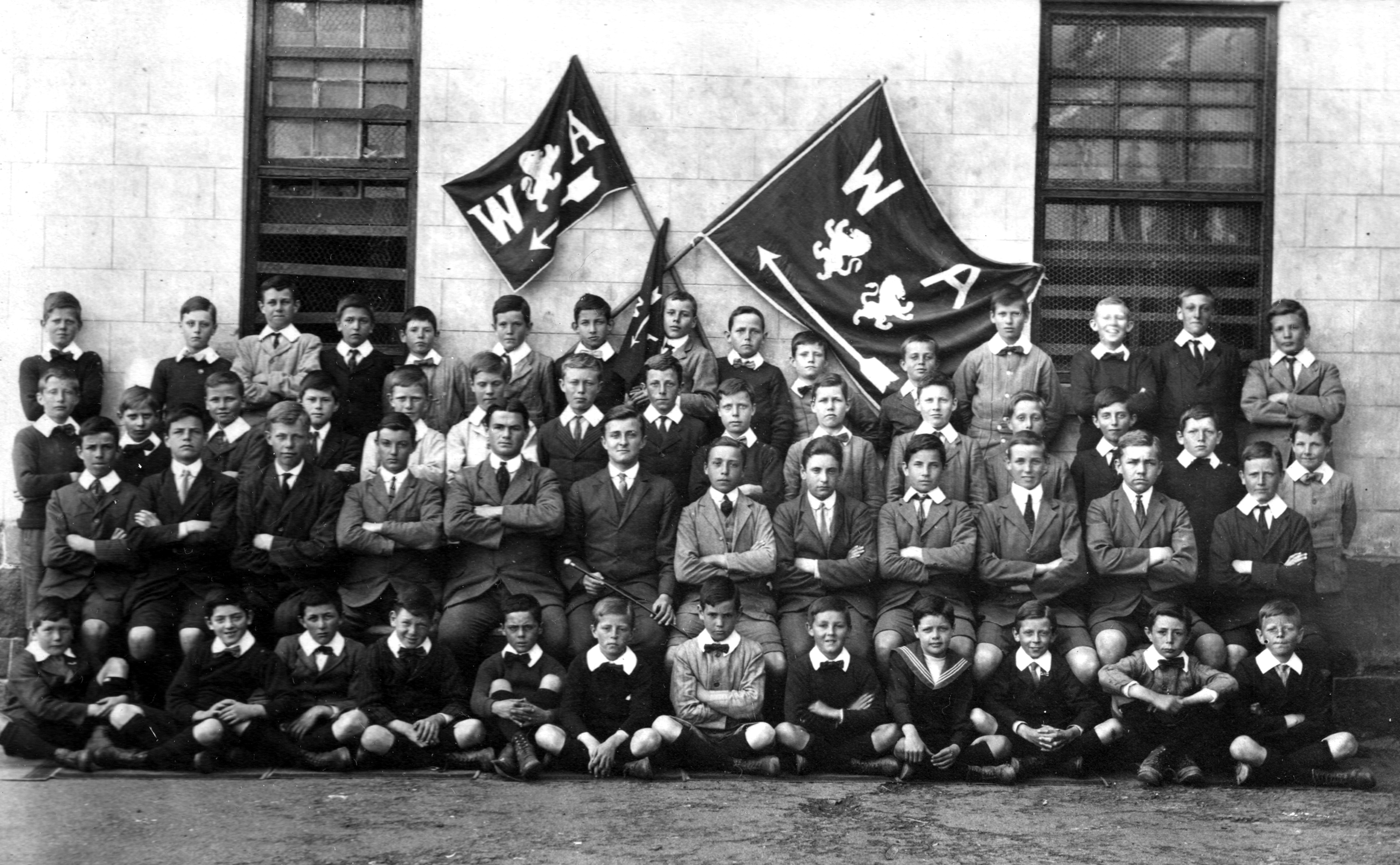
Group photo of boys and staff at Chefoo School, ca. 1915

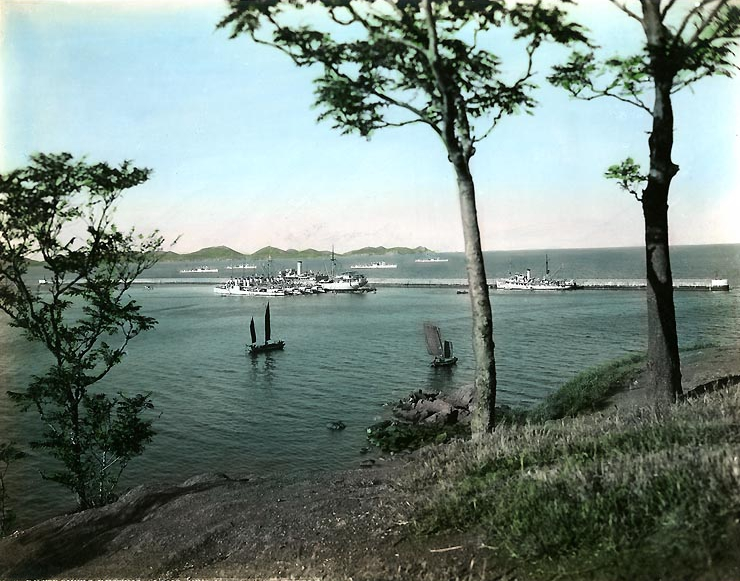
U.S. naval ships anchored in Yantai Bay in the late 1930s

=== Modern history ===
After the creation of the People's Republic of China, Yantai was officially awarded city status with the outlying towns of Laiyang and Wendeng tacked on as "Special Regions" (专区) in 1950. Wendeng was merged into Laiyang six years later, and this larger Laiyang Special Region was combined with Yantai City to become Yantai Prefecture (烟台地区). Yantai is of strategic importance to China's defense, as it and Dalian, directly across the Bohai Sea from it, are primary coastal guard points for Beijing. In November 1983, the prefecture became a prefecture-level city. Yantai was designated a National Historic and Cultural City in 2013.

== Geography ==
Yantai is located along the north coast of the Shandong Peninsula, south of the junction of Bohai Sea and Yellow Sea and parallel to the southern coast of Liaoning. The topographical breakdown consists of:

- 36.62% mountainous
- 39.7% hilly
- 50.23% plain
- 2.90% basin

About 2,643.60 km^{2} (1,020.70 sq mi) is urbanized. Only Qixia City is located entirely inland. All other county-level entities are coastal, with Changdao consisting entirely of islands. The total coastline of the prefecture is 909 kilometers (565 mi).

The summits in the hill country vary from 100–300 meters (330–980 ft); the average peak in the mountainous region is 500 meters (1,600 ft), and the highest point of elevation is the summit of Mount Kunyu (崑嵛山) at 922.8 meters (3,028 ft).

There are 121 rivers over 5 kilometers (3.1 mi) in length, the largest being:

- Wulong River (五龙河)
- Dagu River (大沽河)
- Dagujia River (大沽夹河)
- Wang River (王河)
- Jie River (界河)
- Huangshui River (黃水河)
- Xin'an River (辛安河)
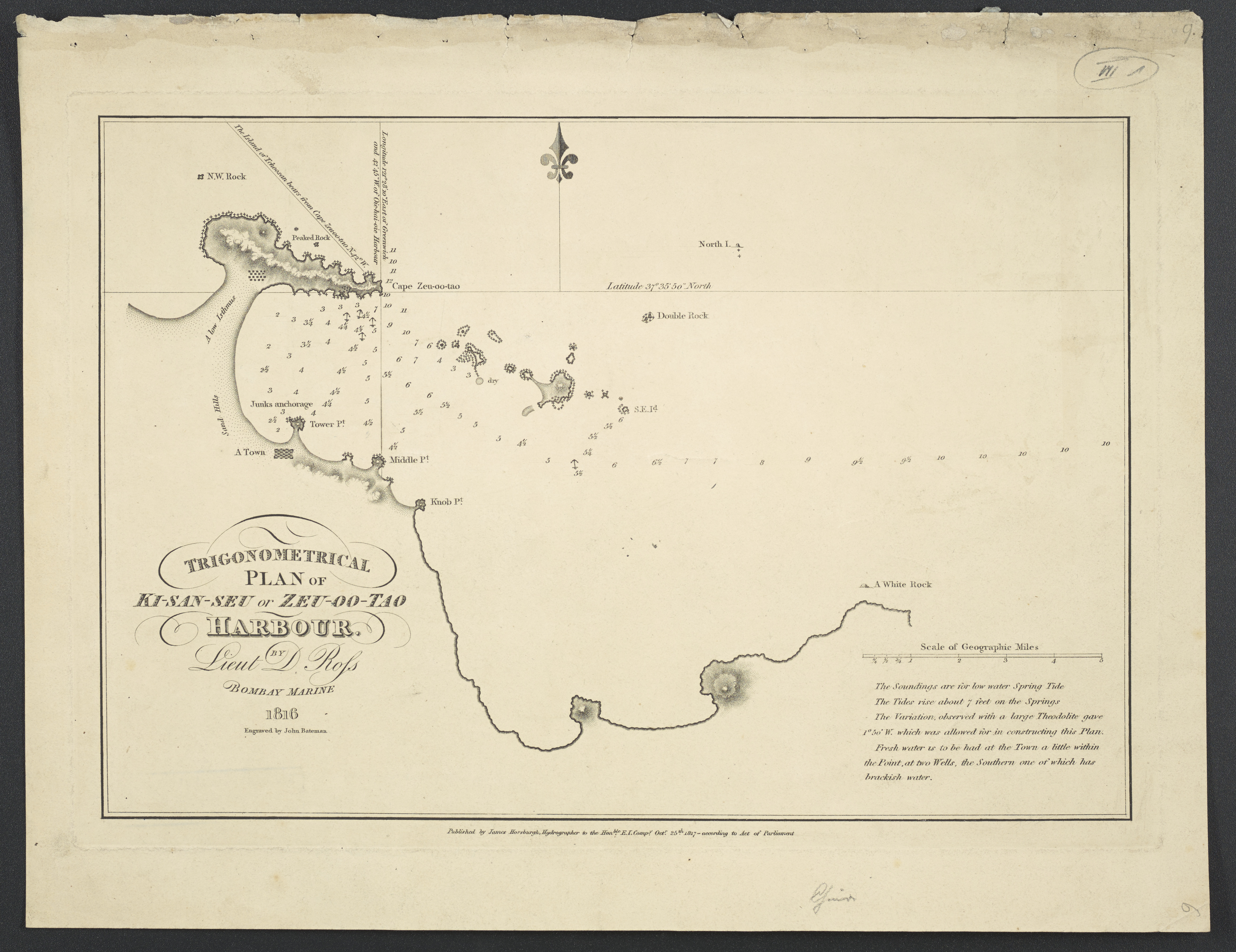
Map of Yantai in 1816

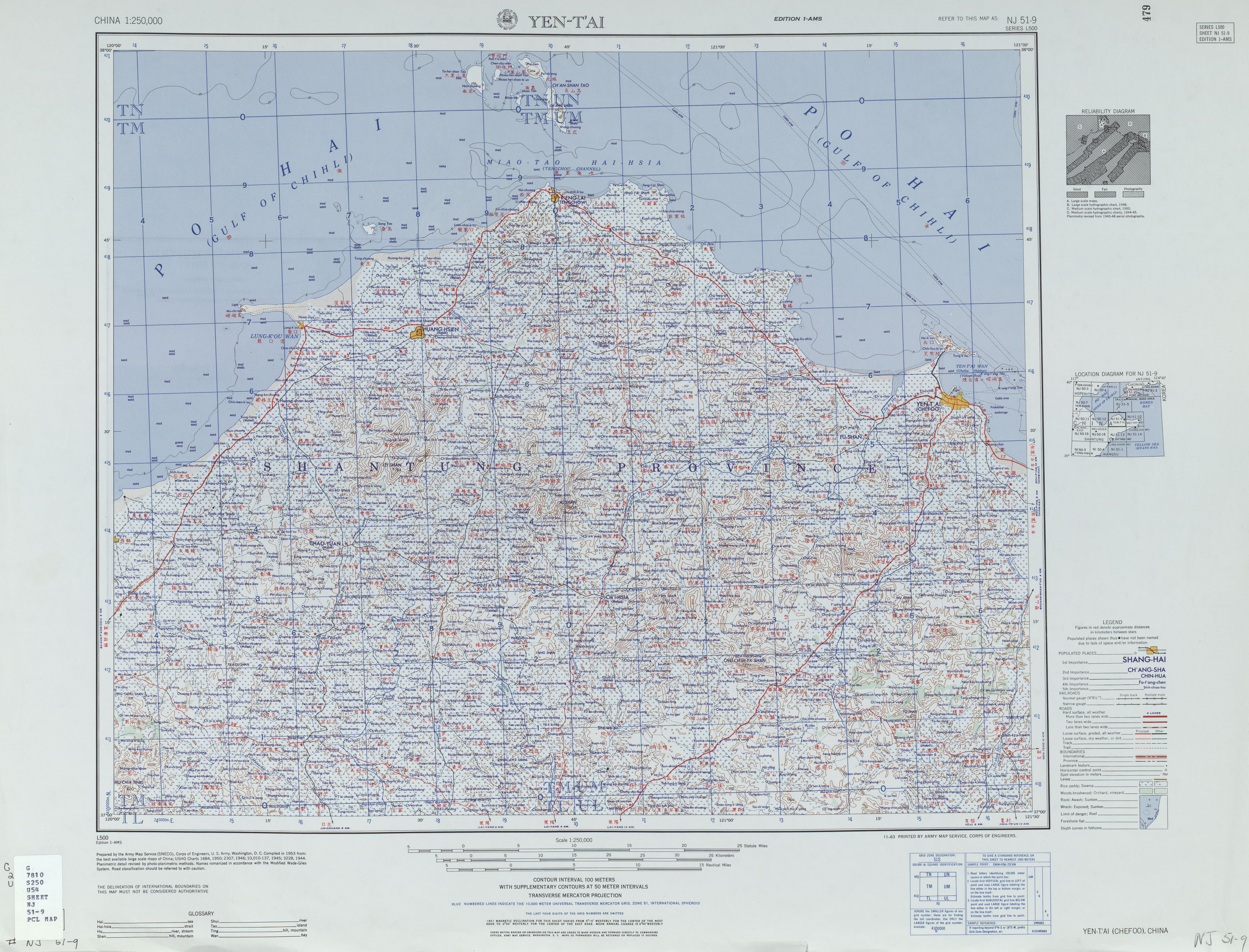
Yantai (labeled as YEN-T'AI (CHEFOO)) (1953)

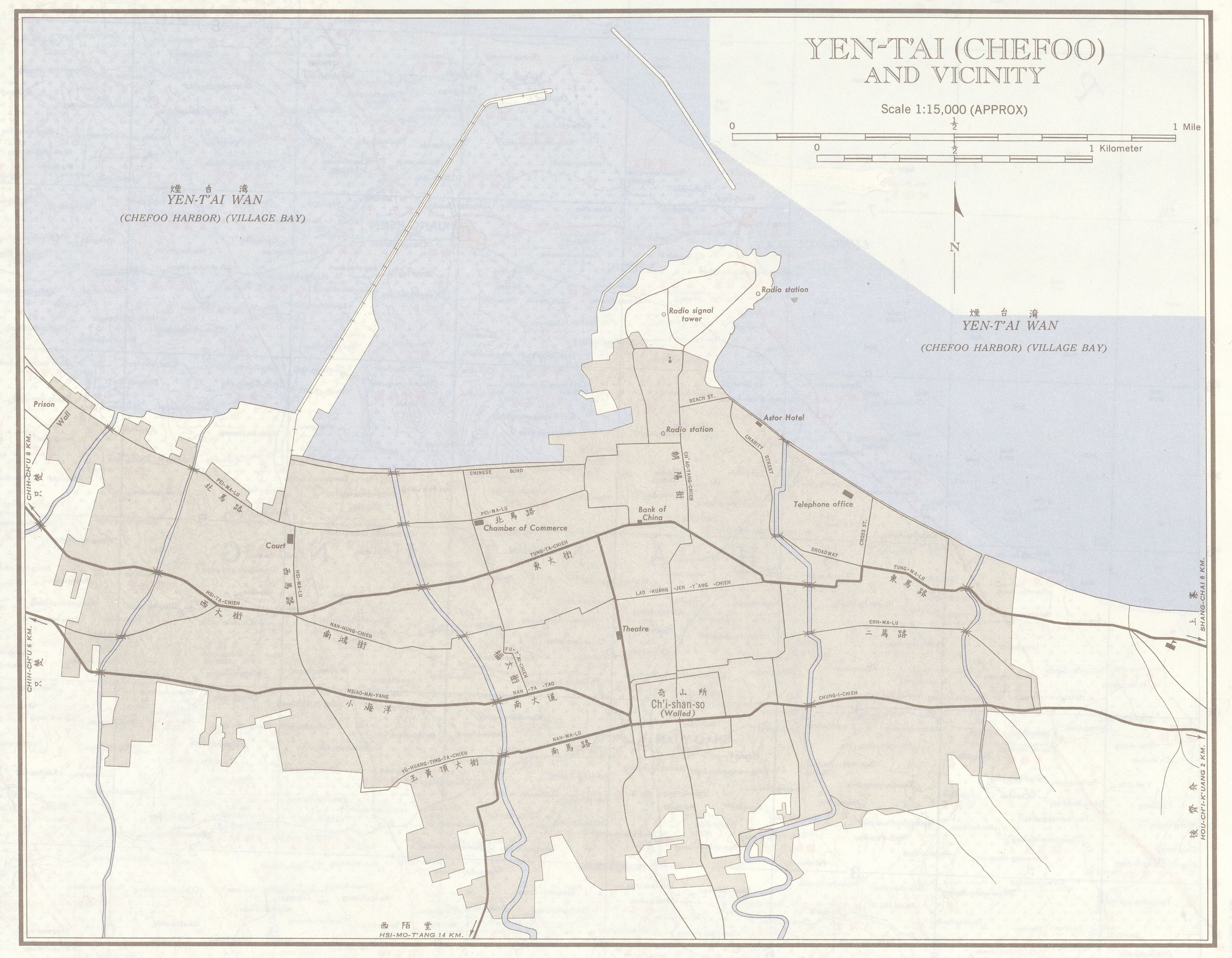
Map of Yantai (labeled as YEN-T'AI (CHEFOO))

=== Climate ===
Yantai has a monsoon-influenced climate which under the Köppen climate classification, Yantai falls within either a hot-summer humid continental climate (Dwa) if the 0 °C (32 °F) isotherm is used or a humid subtropical climate (Cwa) if the −3 °C (27 °F) isotherm is used. Summers are hot, humid, and rainy while winters are cold and dry. Extremes since 1951 have ranged from −12.8 °C (9 °F) (unofficial record of −15 °C (5 °F) was set on January 10, 1931) to 38.4 °C (101 °F).

Climate data for Yantai, elevation 47 m (154 ft), (1991–2020 normals, extremes 1971–present)
Month	Jan	Feb	Mar	Apr	May	Jun	Jul	Aug	Sep	Oct	Nov	Dec	Year
Record high °C (°F)	15.5 (59.9)	19.8 (67.6)	26.5 (79.7)	33.6 (92.5)	35.8 (96.4)	38.0 (100.4)	38.4 (101.1)	37.2 (99.0)	35.1 (95.2)	30.4 (86.7)	26.0 (78.8)	18.8 (65.8)	38.4 (101.1)
Mean daily maximum °C (°F)	2.4 (36.3)	4.7 (40.5)	10.8 (51.4)	17.5 (63.5)	23.5 (74.3)	26.9 (80.4)	28.8 (83.8)	28.5 (83.3)	25.3 (77.5)	19.6 (67.3)	12.1 (53.8)	4.8 (40.6)	17.1 (62.7)
Daily mean °C (°F)	−0.9 (30.4)	0.9 (33.6)	6.0 (42.8)	12.4 (54.3)	18.5 (65.3)	22.3 (72.1)	25.2 (77.4)	25.3 (77.5)	21.7 (71.1)	15.7 (60.3)	8.5 (47.3)	1.6 (34.9)	13.1 (55.6)
Mean daily minimum °C (°F)	−3.4 (25.9)	−1.9 (28.6)	2.4 (36.3)	8.4 (47.1)	14.4 (57.9)	18.9 (66.0)	22.4 (72.3)	22.8 (73.0)	18.9 (66.0)	12.6 (54.7)	5.6 (42.1)	−1.0 (30.2)	10.0 (50.0)
Record low °C (°F)	−12.8 (9.0)	−12.6 (9.3)	−8.1 (17.4)	−2.6 (27.3)	6.6 (43.9)	11.5 (52.7)	14.7 (58.5)	15.0 (59.0)	10.7 (51.3)	0.8 (33.4)	−4.9 (23.2)	−10.8 (12.6)	−12.8 (9.0)
Average precipitation mm (inches)	15.5 (0.61)	13.8 (0.54)	16.9 (0.67)	38.3 (1.51)	52.1 (2.05)	65.5 (2.58)	160.1 (6.30)	143.9 (5.67)	56.7 (2.23)	27.8 (1.09)	35.1 (1.38)	24.4 (0.96)	650.1 (25.59)
Average precipitation days (≥ 0.1 mm)	6.4	4.5	4.0	5.4	6.8	7.9	10.6	10.1	6.1	5.6	5.5	8.0	80.9
Average snowy days	10.9	6.5	2.4	0.2	0	0	0	0	0	0	2.4	10.9	33.3
Average relative humidity (%)	61	59	53	53	58	69	80	81	70	62	61	61	64
Mean monthly sunshine hours	156.0	174.2	233.5	240.4	267.7	244.1	202.0	215.4	217.0	202.8	163.4	141.7	2,458.2
Percentage possible sunshine	51	57	63	61	61	56	46	52	59	59	54	48	56
Source 1: China Meteorological Administrationall-time August record
Source 2: Weather China

== Administration ==
The prefecture-level city of Yantai administers 12 county-level divisions, including 5 districts, 6 county-level cities, and one development zone. (开发区)

District	Local name	City	Local name
Zhifu District	芝罘区	Laiyang City	莱阳市
Fushan District	福山区	Laizhou City	莱州市
Muping District	牟平区	Zhaoyuan City	招远市
Laishan District	莱山区	Qixia City	栖霞市
Penglai District	蓬莱区	Haiyang City	海阳市
Yantai Economic and Technological Development Zone	烟台经济技术开发区	Longkou City	龙口市
Yantai Hi-tech Industrial Development Zone	烟台高新技术产业开发区		

These are further divided into 148 township-level divisions, including 94 towns, six townships, and 48 subdistricts.

Map
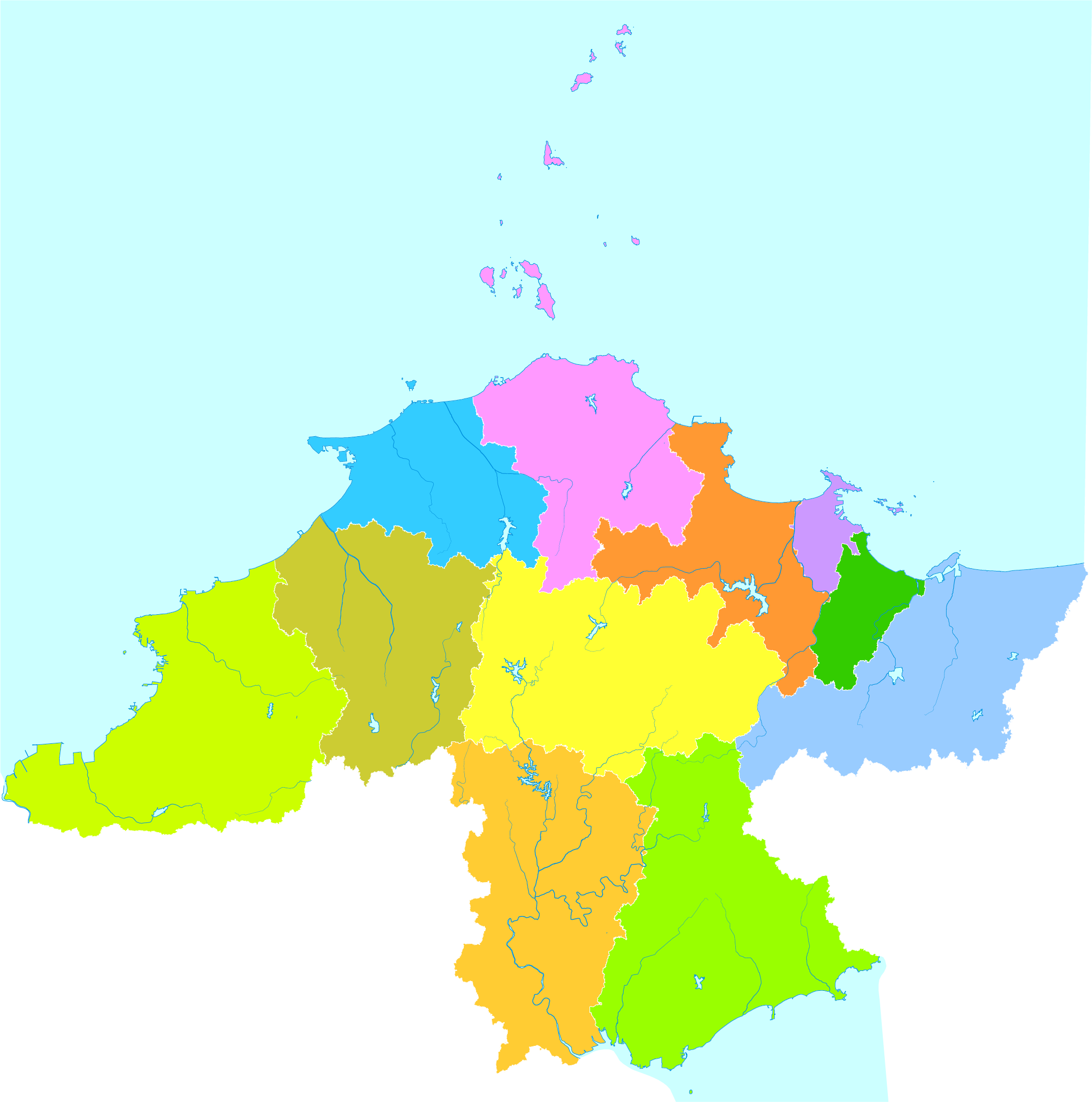

== Economy ==
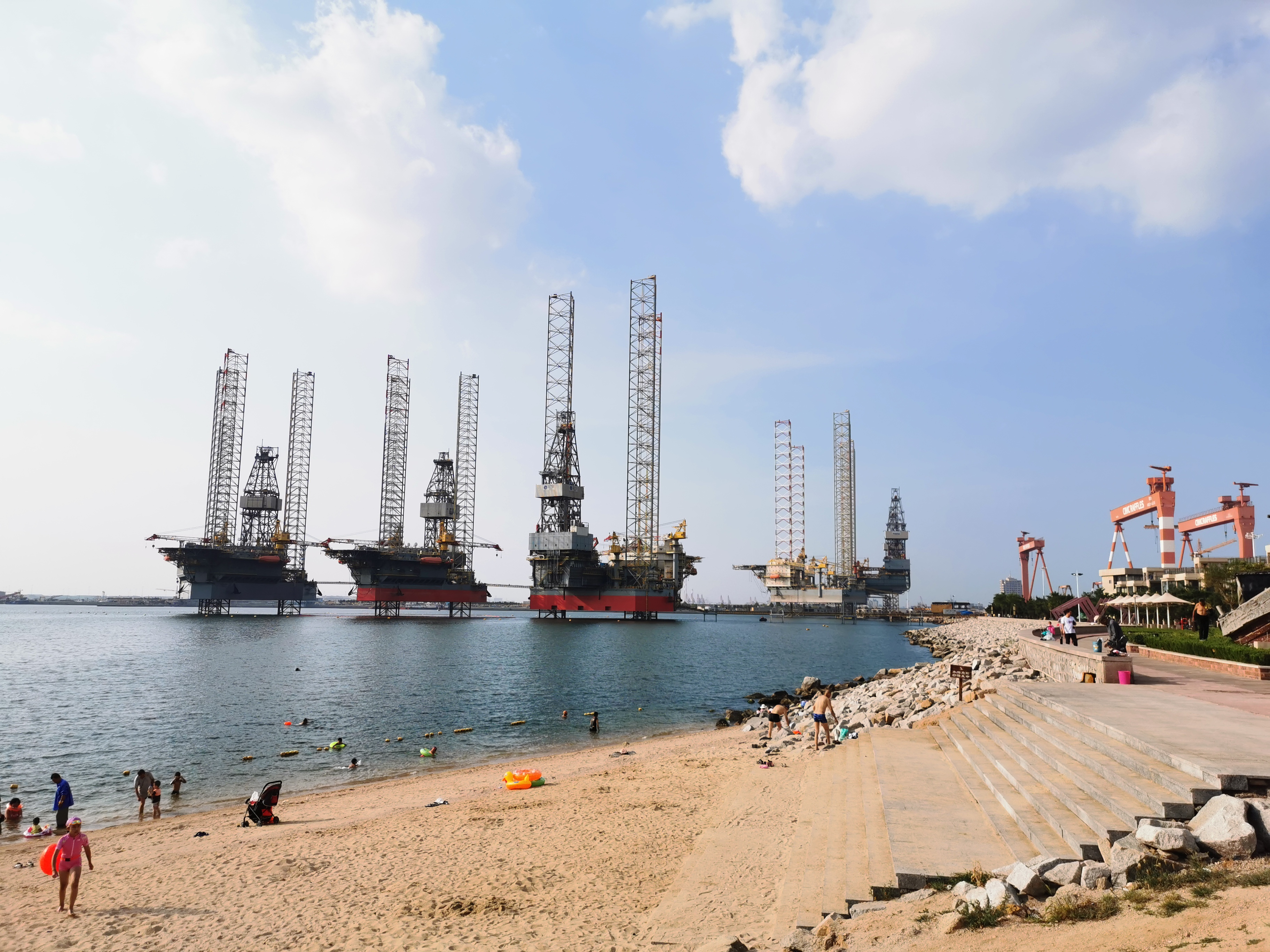
Oil drilling platforms in Longkou

Yantai is currently the second largest industrial city in Shandong, next to Qingdao. However, the region's largest industry is agriculture. It is famous throughout China for a particular variety of apple and Laiyang pear, and is home to the country's largest and oldest grape winery, Changyu.

Yantai has one of the most dynamic and diversified economies in Shandong Province. Historically known for commercial fishing, fruit production (especially apples), and light manufacturing, the city has evolved into a modern industrial base with strengths in equipment manufacturing, petrochemicals, automobile production, electronics, pharmaceuticals, and emerging high-tech industries.

The county-level city of Longkou is well known throughout China for its production of cellophane noodles.

=== Power ===
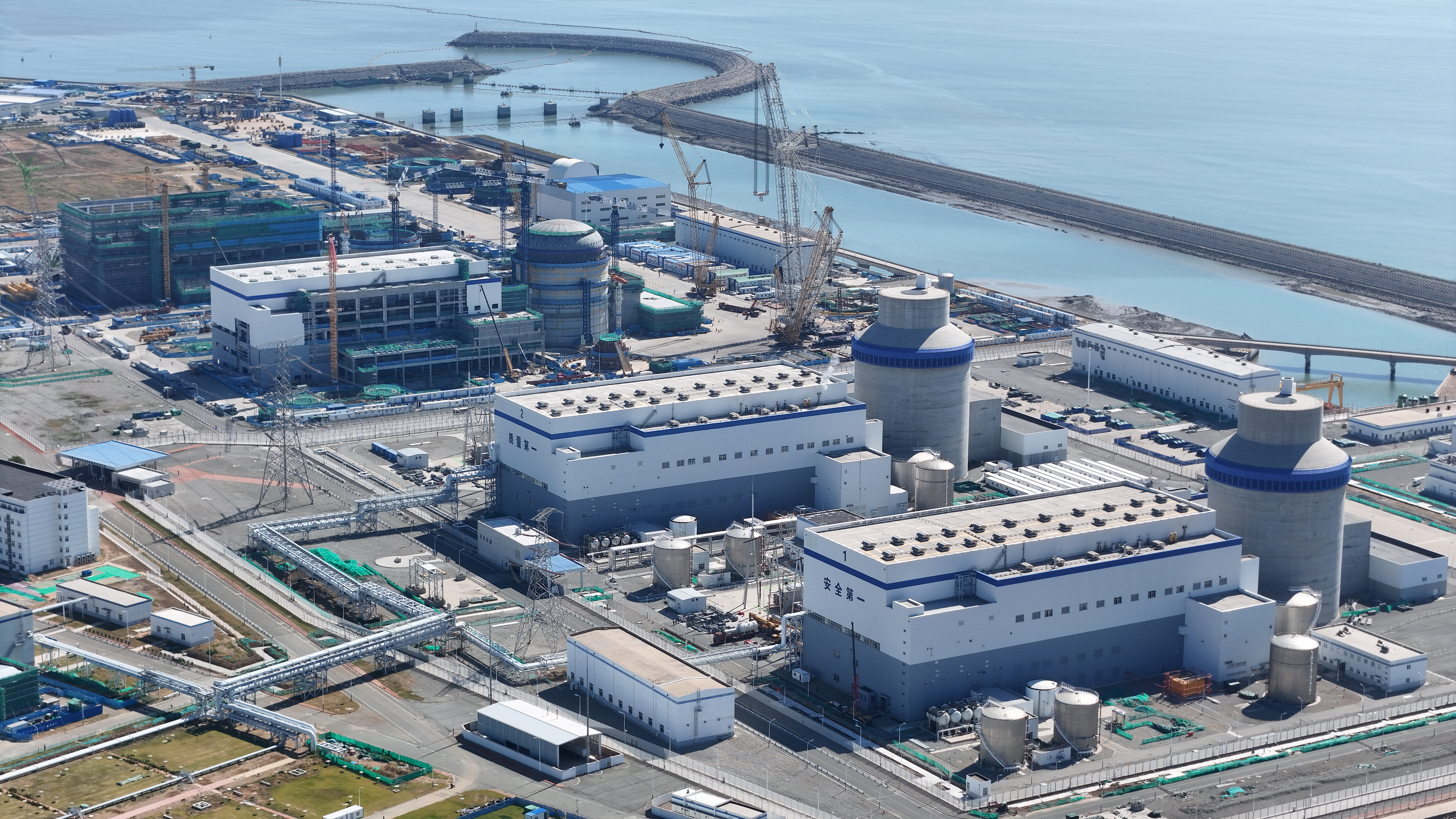
Haiyang Nuclear Power Plant

Yantai derives most of its energy from a large coal power plant using bituminous coal, and fitted with coal gasification technology to minimize pollution. The plant is located close to Yantai port. An attempt to switch northern China from coal to natural gas resulted in shortages, and in 2017 the Chinese government implemented a new plan to convert half of northern China to clean energy for winter heating. Haiyang, a city under Yantai's prefecture, is anticipated to meet its total winter heating needs with nuclear power by 2021.

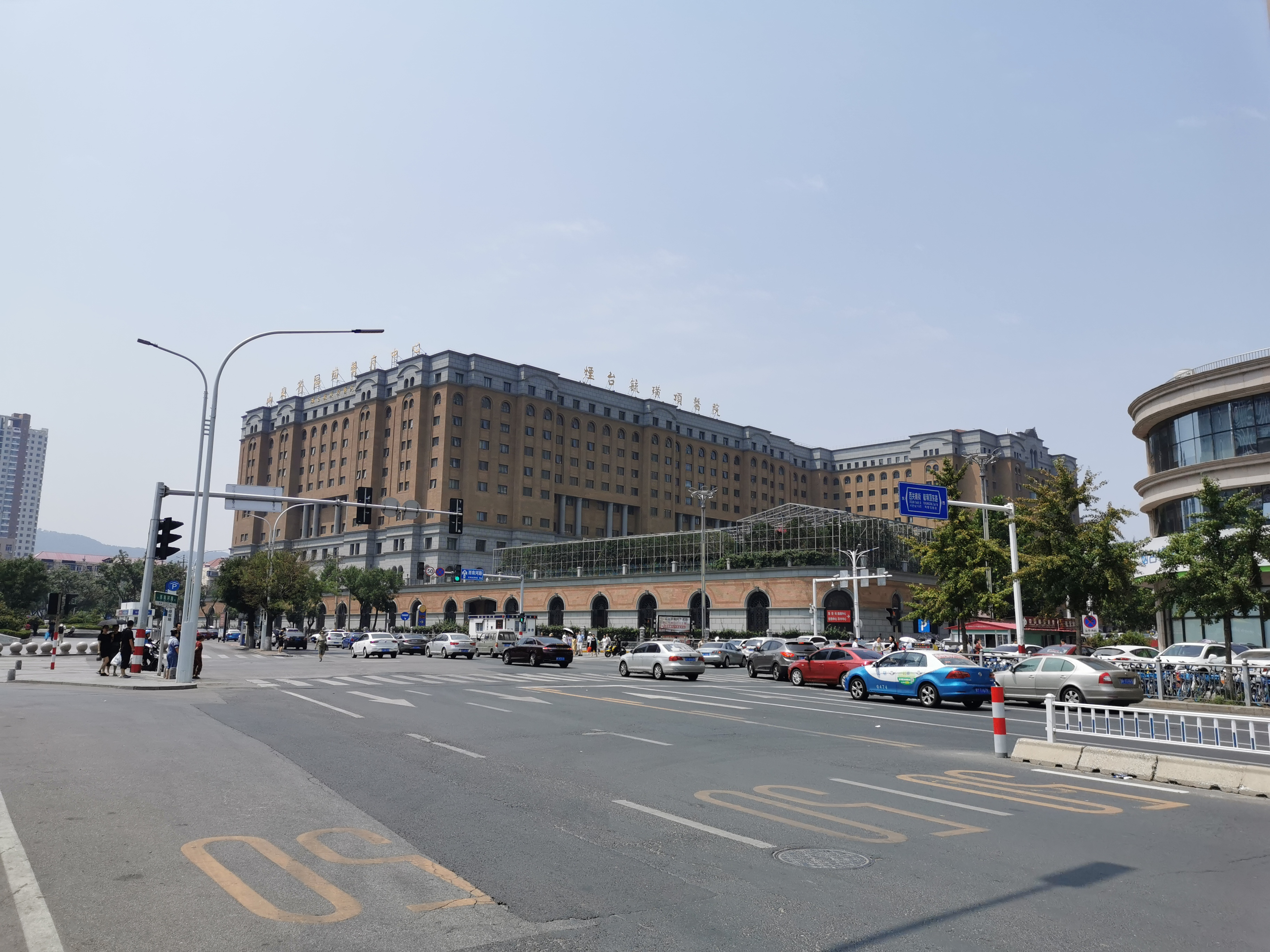
Yuhuangding Hospital, the best hospital in the city

=== Industrial zones ===
Yantai Economic and Technological Development Area

Yantai Economic and Technological Development Area is one of the earliest approved state-level economic development zones in China. It now has a planned area of 10 km^{2} (3.9 sq mi) and a population of 115,000. It lies on the tip of the Shandong Peninsula facing the Yellow Sea. It adjoins downtown Yantai, merely 6 kilometers away from Yantai Port and 6 kilometers away from Yantai Railway Station (not to be confused with Yantai South Railway Station).

Yantai Export Processing Zone

Yantai Export Processing Zone (YTEPZ) is one of the first 15 export processing zones approved by the State Council. The total construction area of YTEPZ is 4.17 km^{2} (1.61 sq mi), in which the initial zone covers 3 km^{2} (1.2 sq mi). After developing for several years, YTEPZ is completely constructed. At present, the infrastructure has been completed, with standard workshops of 120,000 m^{2} (1,300,000 sq ft) and bonded warehouses of 40,000 m^{2} (430,000 sq ft). Up to now, owing to an excellent investment environment, YTEPZ has attracted investors from foreign countries and regions such as Japan, Korea, Singapore, Hong Kong, Taiwan, Sweden, the United States, Canada, etc., as well as domestic investors, to operate in the zone.

== Education ==
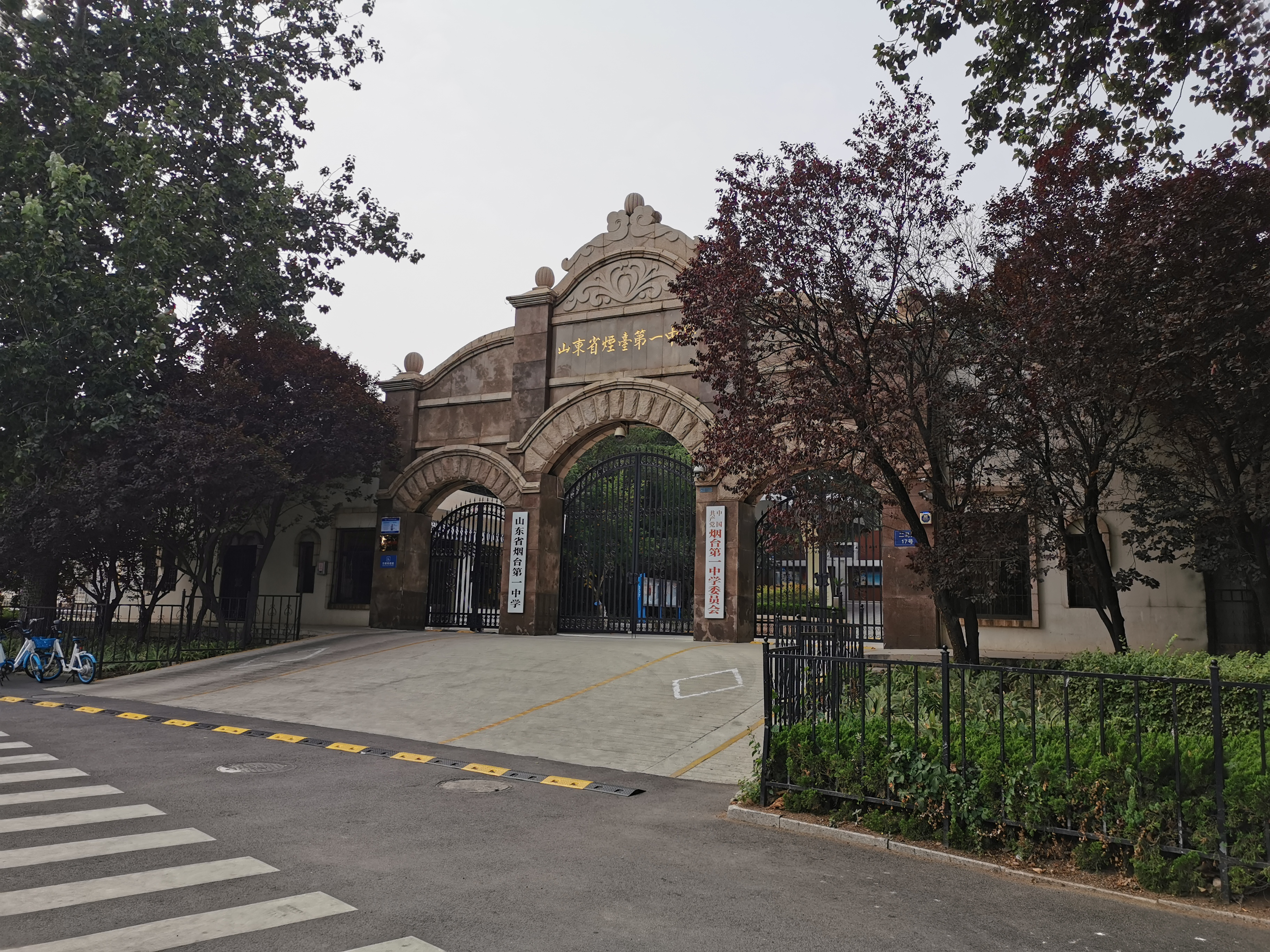
Yantai No.1 High School

The following is a list of prominent Yantai higher education institutions.

- Yantai University
- Ludong University
- Shandong Institute of Business and Technology

China Agricultural University and Binzhou Medical College house campuses in Yantai.

Yantai also houses a Korean international school, Korean School in Yantai. From 1881 to 1951, Chefoo School, a missionary school established to educate foreign children, was operated.

== Transportation ==
Yantai Penglai International Airport provides scheduled flights to major airports in China as well as Seoul, Osaka, and Hong Kong. The Lancun–Yantai railway ends at Yantai. The Qingrong Intercity Railway, the first intercity high-speed railway in Shandong Province, has been put into operation, cutting the travel time of the fastest train from Qingdao to Yantai from about 4 hours and 30 minutes to about 1 hour and 15 minutes.

== Tourism ==
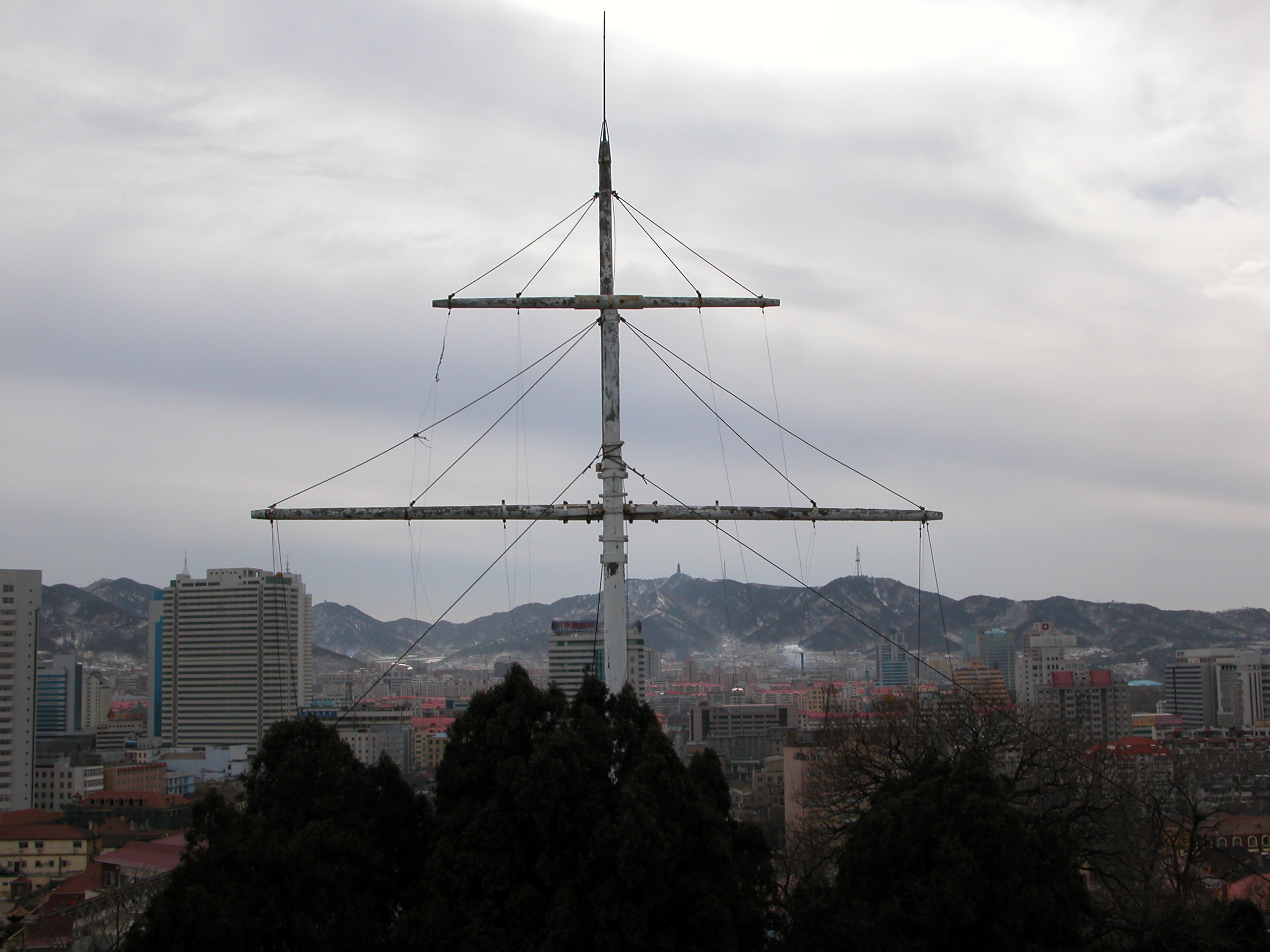
Ship Mast on Yantai Hill

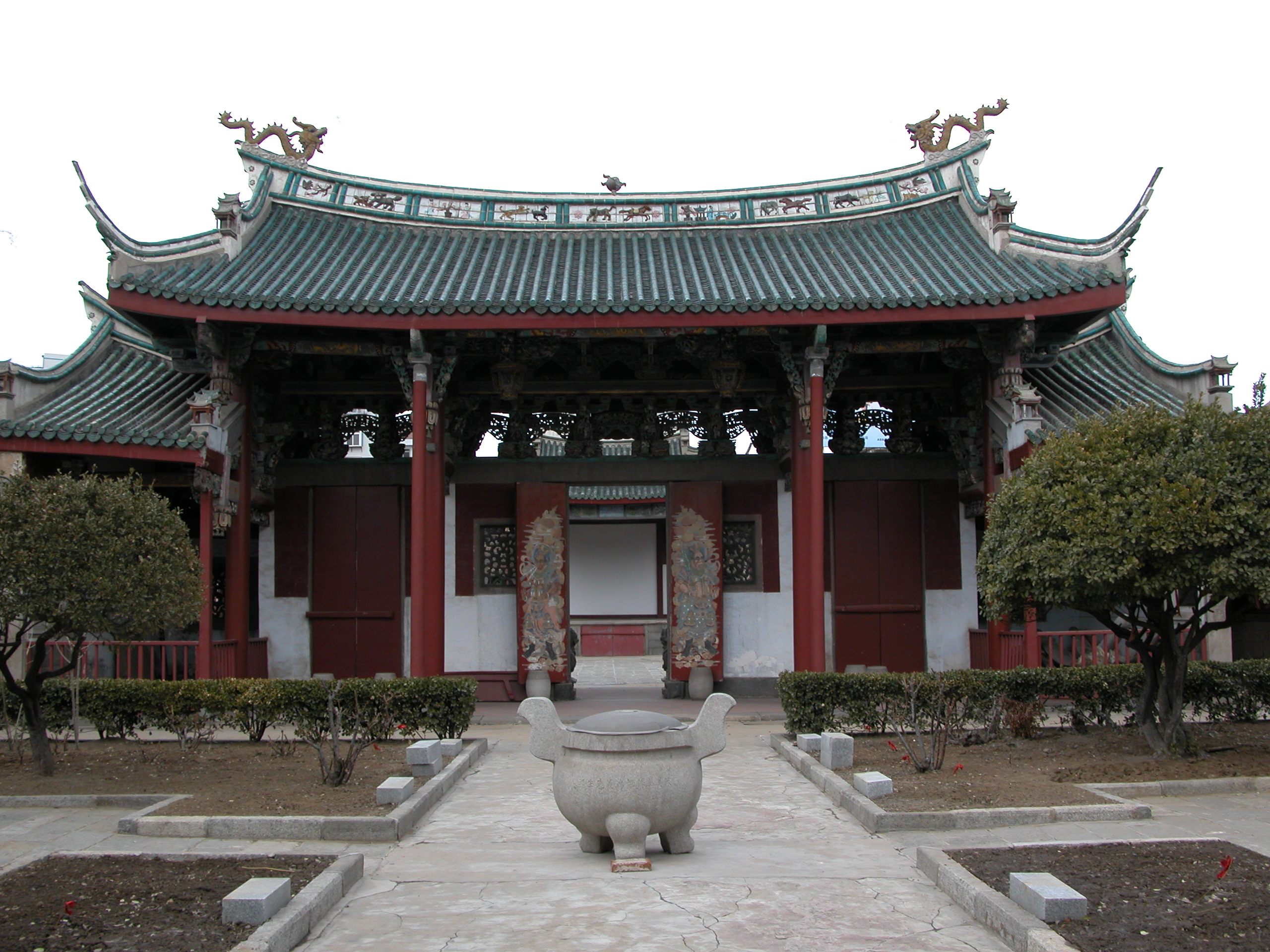
Temple of the Sea Goddess

Penglai City's Dan Cliffs (丹崖) is said to be the departure point of the Eight Immortals on their trip to the Conference of the Magical Peach. Penglai is around 80 km from Downtown Yantai.

Yangma Island is located in the north of Muping District, Yantai and has a large area. The climate on the island is pleasant, with no severe cold in winter and no scorching heat in summer, making it suitable for leisure and vacation. It can be called the Maldives in China. Yangma Island has a long history. It is said that Emperor Qin Shi Huang raised royal horses here during his eastward tour and was named the "Royal Horse Island", hence the name of Yangma Island.

== Twin cities ==
The sister cities of Yantai are list below:

- Vitória, Brazil
- San Diego, United States
- Beppu, Japan
- Tauranga, New Zealand
- Miyako, Japan
- Gunsan, South Korea
- Phuket, Thailand
- Angus, United Kingdom
- Wonju, South Korea
- Ulsan, South Korea
- Örebro, Sweden
- Burgas, Bulgaria
- Quimper, France
- Angers, France
- Incheon, South Korea
- Ansan, South Korea
- Omaha, United States
- Mackay, Australia
- Alcala De Henares, Spain
- Miskolc, Hungary
- Gijón, Spain

== Notable people ==
- Qiu Chuji (1148–1227), leading Quanzhen Taoist priest and founder of Dragon Gate Taoism
- Qi Jiguang (1528–1588), military general most remembered for defending coastal China against the Japanese pirates
- Wang Yirong (1845–1900), official and historian who was first to recognize the oracle bone script
- Henry Luce (1898–1967), founder of Time Magazine, Sports Illustrated, and owned many magazine publications such as Life Magazine
- Peter Stursberg (1913–2014), Canadian writer and journalist
- Chou Wen-chung (1923–2019), composer
- Liu Zewen (b. 1943), artist
- Lin Qingxia (b. 1954), actress
- Wang Zhengpu (b. 1963), politician
- Dong Jun (b.1963), People's Liberation Army Navy commander
- Li Yunze (b. 1970), politician and first post 70's ministerial-level leader
- Huo Jianhua (b. 1979), actor
- Wang Yaping (b. 1980), People's Liberation Army Astronaut Corps astronaut
- Fan Bingbing (b. 1981), actress
- Guanqun Yu (b. 1982), opera singer
- Zhao Yingzi (b. 1990), actress

== See also ==
- Chefoo School
