= Margary =

Margary is a surname. Notable people with the surname include:

- Augustus Raymond Margary (1846–1875), British diplomat and explorer
- Ivan Margary (1896–1976), British historian of ancient Roman
