= Augustus Raymond Margary =

British diplomat (1846–75)

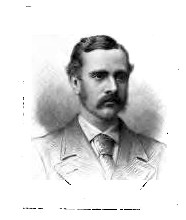
Augustus Raymond Margary

Augustus Raymond Margary (26 May 1846 – 21 February 1875) was a British diplomat and explorer. The murder of Margary and his entire staff, while surveying overland Asian trade routes, sparked the Margary Affair which led to the Chefoo Convention.

== Education and early career ==
Margary was born in the city of Belgaum, in British India as the third son of Major General Henry Joshua Margary (d. 1876). Margary was educated in France, at Brighton College and University College in London. Having failed the entrance exam for the foreign service three times, Margary finally passed the exam and was appointed student interpreter in the British consular service in China in February 1867 and left for China the following month. In China, he served in the British Legation in Peking (Beijing), and the British consulates in Taiwan, Shanghai and Yantai.

== The "Margary Affair" ==
As part of efforts to explore overland trade routes between British India and China, Margary was sent from Shanghai through southwest China to Bhamo in Upper Burma, where he was supposed to meet Colonel Horace Albert Browne (1832–1914). It took Margary six months to make the 1800-mile journey through the provinces of Sichuan, Guizhou and Yunnan, after which he met Browne in Bhamo in late 1874. On the journey back to Shanghai, Margary heard rumors that the return route was not safe and changed the route to Tengyue, where he and his personal staff were murdered on 21 February 1875.

According to Jonathan Spence, Margary was part of a survey team exploring routes from Burma into Yunnan. Susan Orlean gives a different account: "The linguist and plant collector Augustus Margary survived toothache, rheumatism, pleurisy, and dysentery while sailing the Yangtze only to be murdered when he completed his mission and sailed beyond Bhamo"

== Consequences ==
The death of Margary, or the "Margary Affair" as it was known, created a diplomatic crisis and gave British authorities an excuse to put pressure on the Qing government on a number of unrelated issues. The crisis was only resolved in 1876 when Thomas Francis Wade and Li Hongzhang signed the Chefoo Convention, which covered a number of diplomatic/political items. The British demanded, and got, according to Spence, an indemnity of 700,000 taels of silver, a mission of apology to Queen Victoria, and four more treaty ports.

In 1880, a memorial was erected to the memory of Margary, which was moved to the Public Gardens in 1907. The memorial was removed during the Japanese occupation of Shanghai and was never restored after Japan's defeat in World War Two. There is a monument in Tengyue to remember the bravery of those ethnic groups of Tai, Jingbo, Han and Chinese Muslims, fought to stop and kill Margary and his followers.
