= Chefoo Convention =

1876 treaty between China and Great Britain

- Traditional Chinese: 煙臺條約
- Simplified Chinese: 烟台条约
- Literal meaning: Yantai Treaty
Transcriptions
Standard Mandarin
- Hanyu Pinyin: Yāntái Tiáoyuē

The Chefoo Convention, known in Chinese as the Yantai Treaty, was an unequal treaty between Britain and Qing China, signed by Sir Thomas Wade and Li Hongzhang in Chefoo (now a district of Yantai) on 21 August 1876. The convention settled the Margary Affair in exchange for expanded commercial concessions to Britain.

The Chinese government has described the Chefoo Convention as an "unequal treaty".

== Contents ==
The convention consisted of sixteen articles and was divided into three sections. The first section dealt with the resolution of the Margary Affair, calling for the punishment of the people implicated in the murder of Augustus Raymond Margary the year before and stipulating that an indemnity be paid to Margary's relatives. The second section dealt with official intercourse between the two empires and specified the extraterritorial privileges of British subjects in China. The final section dealt with trade, prohibiting the levying of the Lijin in the treaty ports, outlawing other forms of taxes on foreign goods, and opening a number of new treaty ports.

One practical result of the treaty was that the official mission of apology to Britain, led by Guo Songtao, became a permanent diplomatic mission in Britain, opening the way for a permanent foreign representation of China.

== Ratification ==
The Chefoo Convention was ratified immediately by the Qing government, but was not ratified by Britain until July 1885, due to criticism and opposition from British opium merchants in Calcutta and Bombay, as well as from the government of the British Raj.
