= Likin (taxation) =

Domestic customs tax in the Chinese Empire and Republic

- Traditional Chinese: 釐金
- Simplified Chinese: 厘金
- Postal: likin
Transcriptions
Standard Mandarin
- Hanyu Pinyin: líjīn
- Wade–Giles: li-kin

The likin or lijin or lekin or liken was a form of domestic customs tax in the Chinese Empire and Republic, which was first introduced as a means of financing the largely locally recruited armies to suppress the Taiping Rebellion.

== History ==
The likin tax was first introduced in 1853 by censor Lei Yixian in the area around Yangzhou as a way of raising funds in the campaigns against local rebels. As the central government was short of revenue, the imperial court sanctioned the tax and it quickly became an important source of funds for the campaign against the Taiping and Nian rebellions.

The tax was levied on an ad valorem basis on goods in transit between provinces and on shops, with rates ranging from 2 to 10 per cent. After the Taipings were suppressed in 1864, the likin became a permanent feature of the Chinese tax system and it became an important source of revenue for local government. In many ways, the tax signified the decentralization of state authority in the wake of the Taiping rebellion.

The Treaty of Nanjing ending the First Opium War, the most favored nation clauses in subsequent "unequal treaties" with imperialist Europe, and the disorder of the Taiping Rebellion reduced China's ability to impose or levy their own external tariffs (customs), with the Chinese Maritime Customs Service under European control after 1854. Foreign merchants protested against the likin as a violation of China's treaties and raised the issue repeatedly, including at the Chefoo Convention. As it was imposed on all goods both foreign and domestic, however, it survived the fall of the Qing dynasty into the Warlord Era and was not ended until 1 January 1931.

== See also ==
- Chinese Maritime Customs Service
- Self-Strengthening Movement
- Taxation in premodern China
- Guo Songtao
