= Thomas Francis Wade =

19th-century British linguist and diplomat

Sir Thomas Francis Wade GCMG KCB
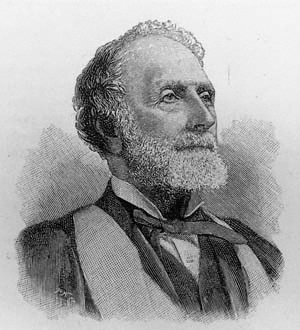
- Thomas Wade (published 1895)
- Born: 25 August 1818; London, England
- Died: 31 July 1895 (aged 76); Cambridge, England
- Education: Trinity College, Cambridge
- Scientific career
- Fields: Sinology

Chinese name
- Traditional Chinese: 威妥瑪
- Simplified Chinese: 威妥玛
Transcriptions
Standard Mandarin
- Hanyu Pinyin: Wēi Tuǒmǎ
- Wade–Giles: Wei1 T'o3-ma3

Sir Thomas Francis Wade, GCMG KCB (25 August 1818 – 31 July 1895) was a British diplomat and sinologist who produced an early Chinese textbook in English, in 1867, that was later amended, extended and converted into the Wade-Giles romanization system for Mandarin Chinese by Herbert Giles in 1892. He was the first professor of Chinese at Cambridge University.

== Early life ==
Born in London, he was the elder son of Colonel Thomas Wade, CB, of the Black Watch and Anne Smythe (daughter of William Smythe) of Barbavilla, County Westmeath, Ireland. He was educated at the Cape, in Mauritius, at Harrow and at Trinity College, Cambridge. In 1838, his father purchased for him a commission in the 81st Foot. Exchanging (1839) into the 42nd Highlanders, he served with his regiment in the Ionian Islands, devoting his leisure to the study of Italian and modern Greek.

== Career in China ==
On receiving his commission as lieutenant in 1841 he exchanged into the 98th Foot, then under orders for Qing China and landed at Hong Kong in June 1842. The scene of the First Opium War had at that time been transferred to the Yangtze River and Wade was ordered there with his regiment. There he took part in the attack on Zhenjiang and in the advance on Nanjing.

In 1843, he was appointed Cantonese interpreter to the garrison and, two years later, to the Supreme Court of Hong Kong, and, in 1846, assistant Chinese secretary to the superintendent of trade, Sir John Francis Davis. In 1852 he was appointed vice-consul at Shanghai. The Taiping Rebellion had so disorganised the city's administration that it was considered advisable to put the collection of the foreign customs duties into commission, a committee of three, of whom Wade was the chief, being entrusted with the administration of the customs. This formed the beginning of the imperial maritime customs service.

In 1855, Wade was appointed Chinese secretary to Sir John Bowring, who had succeeded Sir John Davis at Hong Kong. On the declaration of the Second Opium War in 1857, he was attached to Lord Elgin's staff as Chinese secretary and with the assistance of Horatio Nelson Lay he conducted the negotiations which led up to the Treaty of Tientsin (1858). In the following year he accompanied Sir Frederick Bruce in his attempt to exchange the ratification of the treaty, and was present at Taku when the force attending the mission was attacked and driven back from the Hai River.

On Lord Elgin's return to China in 1860, he resumed his former post of Chinese secretary, and was mainly instrumental in arranging for the advance of the special envoys and the British and French forces to Tianjin and subsequently towards Beijing. For the purpose of arranging for a camping ground in Tongzhou he accompanied Mr (afterwards Sir) Harry Parkes on his first visit to that city. Wade took a leading part in the following negotiations, and on the establishment of the legation at Peking he took up the post of Chinese secretary of legation. In 1862 Wade was made a Companion of the Bath.

Wade was acting Chargé d'Affaires in Beijing from June 1864 to November 1865 and from November 1869 to July 1871. Wade was appointed Envoy Extraordinary and Minister Plenipotentiary and Chief Superintendent of British Trade in China in that year and served in that role until his retirement in 1883. He conducted long and difficult negotiations in the wake of the 1870 Tianjin Massacre, and was knighted in 1875. Despite leaving Beijing in the wake of the Margary Affair, Wade negotiated the Chefoo Convention in 1876 with Li Hongzhang. He was then made KCB.

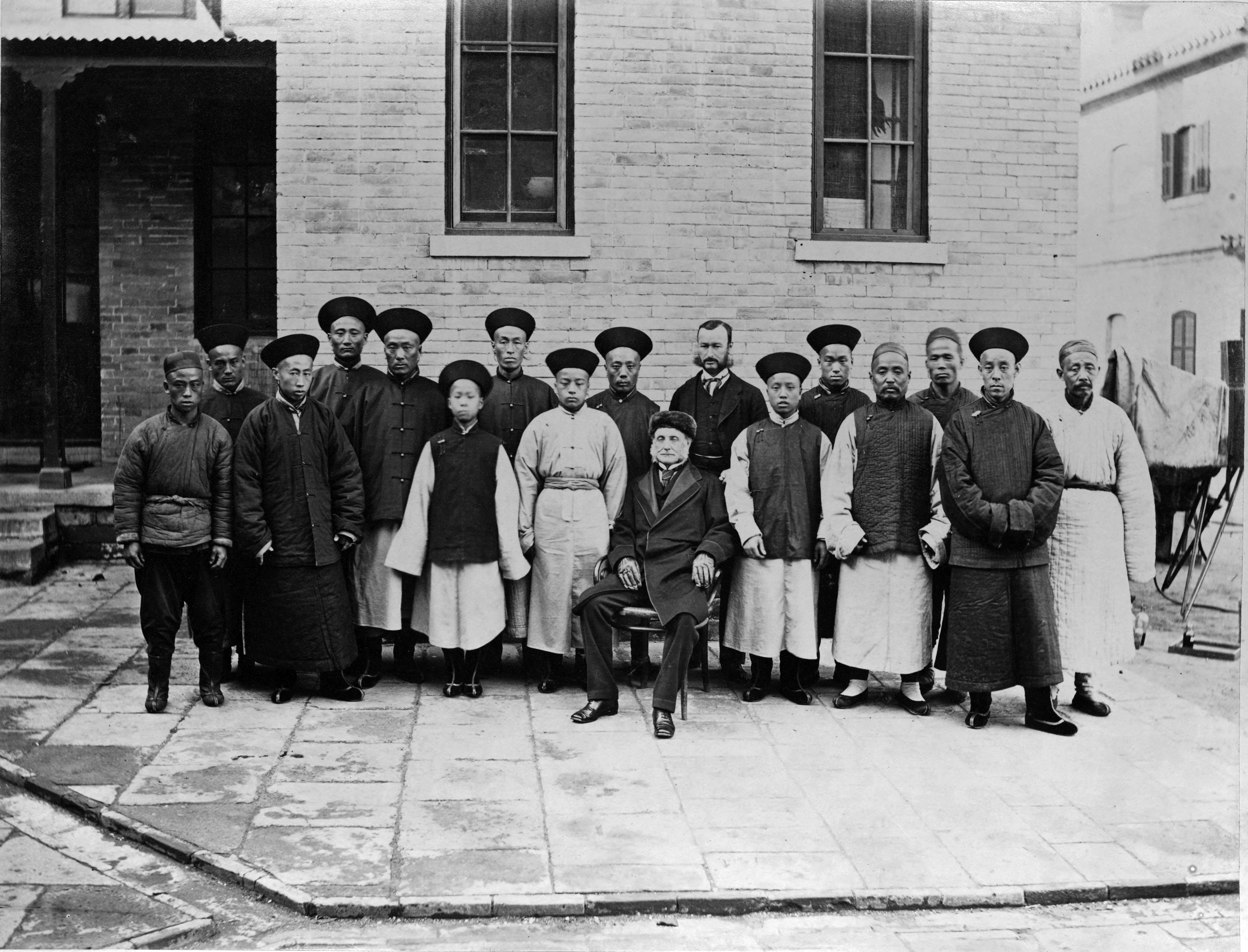
H. E. Sir Thos. Francis Wade, K.C.B., and a group of his servants photographed in the Legation compound 1879.

== Return to England ==
After retiring from working over forty years in the British embassies in China, he returned to England in 1883, and three years later donated 4,304 volumes of Chinese literature to the Cambridge University Library's Oriental Collection. In 1888, he was elected the first Professor of Chinese at the University of Cambridge. He held the position as a professor until his death in Cambridge at 77. He served as president of the Royal Asiatic Society from 1887 to 1890.

Wade was married to Amelia Herschel (1841–1926), daughter of astronomer John Herschel.

== Works ==
In addition to diplomatic duties, Wade published books assisting in learning of the Chinese language:

- The Peking Syllabary; being a collection of the characters representing the dialect of Peking; arranged after a new orthography in syllabic classes, according to the four tones; designed to accompany the Hsin Ching Lu, or Book of Experiments, (Hong Kong), 1859.
- 語言自邇集 Yü-yen Tzŭ-erh Chi, a progressive course designed to assist the student of Colloquial Chinese, as spoken in the capital and the Metropolitan Department, London, 1867.
- 漢字習寫法 ῾Han Tzŭ Hsi Hsieh Fa, a set of writing exercises, designed to accompany the Colloquial Series of the Tzŭ Erh Chi, London, 1867.
- 文件自趰集 Wên-chien Tzŭ-erh Chi, a series of papers selected as specimens of Documentary Chinese, London, 1867.

In these books, Wade produced an innovative system of transliteration of Chinese pronunciation into the Latin alphabet (i.e., "romanization"), based on the pronunciation conventions of the Beijing dialect. Wade's system was later modified by Herbert Giles (Giles succeeded Wade as professor of Chinese at Cambridge University), into the "Wade system as modified by Giles": the system now more generally known as the Wade-Giles system. It was the dominant transliteration system for much of the 20th century. Though it was replaced by the Pinyin system, it is still used in some publications and communities.

=== List of works ===
- Thomas Francis Wade (1850). Note on the condition and government of the Chinese empire in 1849.
- Thomas Francis Wade (1851). The Chinese Army: Containing Notices of Its Bannermen, Hánkiun, and Luhying Divisions: With Details Respecting Their Organization, Locations, Pay, Efficiency, &c. n.p.
- Thomas Francis Wade (1859). The Hsin Ching Lu, or, Book of Experiments; being the first of a Series of Contributions to the Study of Chinese: By Francis Thomas Wade. bound with The Peking Syllabary; being a collection of the characters representing the dialect of Peking; arranged after a new orthography in syllabic classes, according to the four tones; designed to accompany the Hsin Ching Lu, or Book of Experiments
- Jules Picard; Thomas Francis Wade (1860). État général des forces militaires et maritimes de la China, solde, armes, équipements, etc. J. Corréard.
- Thomas Francis Wade (1867). Yü-yen Tzŭ-erh Chi, a Progressive Course Designed to Assist the Student of Colloquial Chinese, as Spoken in the Capital and the Metropolitan Department: In Eight Parts, with Key, Syllabary, and Writing Exercises. Trübner. (link not inc. Key and New Edition of the Syllabary)
- Thomas Francis Wade (1867). Yü-yen Tzŭ-erh Chi, a Progressive Course designed to assist the student of solloquial Chinese, as spoken in the capital and the Metropolitan Department: with key, syllabary, and writing exercises. Key to the Tzŭ Erh Chi : colloquial series. Trübner. (link to Key and New Edition of the Syllabary only)
- Thomas Francis Wade (1867). Wên-chien Tzŭ-erh Chi, a Series of Papers Selected as Specimens of Documentary Chinese, Designed to Assist Students of the Language as Written by the Officials of China: Key tho the Tzū Erh chi : documentary series. Trübner.
- Thomas Francis Wade (1869). The Lun Yü: Being Utterances of Kung Tzu, Known to the Western World as Confucius. S. Austin.
- Cambridge University Library; Thomas Francis Wade (1898). A catalog of the Wade collection of Chinese and Manchu books in the library of the University of Cambridge. University Press.
