= Chinese dispatch boat Tientsin =

Chinese dispatch boat

Tientsin
Lay-Osborn Flotilla
- Name: Tientsin (天津); San Wei (三衛)
- Namesake: Tianjin
- Builder: Laird Brothers Limited
- Yard number: 296
- Laid down: 1862
- Launched: 2 February 1863
- Out of service: 1863
- Fate: Sold, 30 December 1865

General characteristics
- Class & type: Dispatch boat
- Displacement: 448 long tons (455 t)
- Tons burthen: 448 bm
- Length: 150 ft 0 in (45.72 m)
- Beam: 25 ft 0 in (7.62 m)
- Draught: 12 ft 10 in (3.9 m)
- Installed power: Single shaft engine; 80 nhp; 320 hp (240 kW)
- Complement: 70

Tientsin (Chinese: 天津; pinyin: Tiānjīn; lit. 'Tianjin') was a British-made dispatch boat launched in 1863.

== History ==
Tientsin was ordered by Horatio Nelson Lay, Inspector General of the Qing Dynasty Chinese Maritime Customs Service as part of an effort to bolster the Qing Dynasty naval force in response to the ongoing Taiping Rebellion. Thereafter she became part of the Lay-Osborn Flotilla commanded by Sherard Osborn. She was put under the command of Captain Beville Granville Wyndham Nicolas. Upon her arrival in China, the Qing government ordered the ship to be renamed as San Wei (Chinese: 三衛; pinyin: Sānwèi).

Disagreements between the Qing government and Lay over the command and composition of the Lay-Osborn Flotilla led to its disbandment in 1863, and Tientsin returned to the United Kingdom. She was originally intended for sale, but an embargo on sales, due to the concurrent American Civil War and fear of the vessel joining the Confederate States Navy, prevented any sales. When the American Civil War ended in 1865, she, along with China and Pekin, were sold in an auction to Egypt on 30 December 1865 for £20,500.

=== Tientsin in the Guangdong Fleet ===
A Tientsin with identical characteristics was part of the Guangdong Fleet c. 1867. Richard Wright speculated that Tientsin was eventually (or alternatively) acquired by the Imperial Maritime Customs Service in Britain, 1868. She was used as a customs cruiser at Canton.
