= HMS Africa (1862) =

Sloop of the Royal Navy

History

United Kingdom
- Name: HMS Africa
- Namesake: Africa
- Builder: Devonport Dockyard
- Launched: 14 February 1862
- Acquired: 29 March 1862 (Completed)
- Fate: Sold, 13 August 1862

Lay-Osborn Flotilla
- Name: China; I T'ung
- Namesake: China
- Acquired: 13 August 1862
- Fate: Sold, 30 December 1865

General characteristics
- Class & type: Rosario-class sloop
- Displacement: 913 long tons (928 t)
- Tons burthen: 669 bm
- Length: 160 ft 0 in (48.76 m)
- Beam: 30 ft 3 in (9.23 m)
- Draught: 16 ft 0 in (4.87 m)
- Installed power: Steam engine, 2 boilers; 530 ihp (400 kW)
- Propulsion: Single shaft
- Speed: 9.5 knots (17.6 km/h; 10.9 mph)
- Complement: 140
- Armament: 1 × 40-pounder gun; 6 × 32-pounder guns; 4 × 20-pounder guns

HMS Africa was a Victorian screw sloop launched in 1862 and sold to China later that year.

== History ==
HMS Africa was purchased by Horatio Nelson Lay, Inspector General of the Qing Dynasty Chinese Maritime Customs Service, on 13 August 1862, as part of an effort to bolster the Qing Dynasty naval force in response to the ongoing Taiping Rebellion. Thereafter she was renamed China (Chinese: 中國; pinyin: Zhōngguó; Wade–Giles: Chung Kuo), and became part of the Lay-Osborn Flotilla commanded by Sherard Osborn. She was put under the command of Lieut. Noel Osborn. Upon her arrival in China, the Qing government ordered the ship to be renamed as I T'ung (Chinese: 一統; pinyin: Yītǒng; lit. 'Unification').

However, disagreements between the Qing government and Lay over the command and composition of the Lay-Osborn Flotilla arose soon after her arrival, and during negotiations Osborn took China and Thule to Taku to get away from the Chinese treatment. The disagreements eventually led to its disbandment, and China returned to the United Kingdom. She was originally intended for sale, but an embargo on sales, due to the concurrent American Civil War and fear of the vessel joining the Confederate States Navy, prevented any sales. When the American Civil War ended in 1865, she, along with Pekin and Tientsin, were sold in an auction to Egypt on 30 December 1865 for £20,500.
