= List of shipwrecks in October 1869 =

The list of shipwrecks in October 1869 includes ships sunk, foundered, grounded, or otherwise lost during October 1869.

== 1 October ==
List of shipwrecks: 1 October 1869
Ship	State	Description
Braganza	United Kingdom	The steamship collided with Jerome (United Kingdom) and foundered off Point Lynas, Anglesey. Seven crew were reported missing; the rest were rescued by Jerome. Braganza was on a voyage from Liverpool, Lancashire to Lisbon, Portugal.
Era	United Kingdom	The schooner was run into by a French schooner and sank off Berry Head, Devon. Her crew survived.
Exertion	United Kingdom	The brigantine foundered in the English Channel 7 nautical miles (13 km) south west of Folkestone, Kent. Her crew were rescued.
Haddock	United Kingdom	The ship sank at Galway. She was refloated on 11 December and taken in to Galway.
Mary Campbell	United Kingdom	The ship foundered. Her crew were rescued. She was on a voyage from Lagos, Africa to London.
Nicolo Seconda	Italy	The barque collided with the brig Sea Spray (United Kingdom) and sank in the English Channel off Deadman Point, Cornwall, United Kingdom with the loss of eight of her fourteen crew. She was on a voyage from South Shields, County Durham, United Kingdom to Genoa.
Rosebank	Norway	The schooner was wrecked at St. Andrews, Fife, United Kingdom.
Usworth	United Kingdom	The steamship was damaged by an onboard explosion at Newcastle upon Tyne, Northumberland.
Viking	United Kingdom	The steamship was driven ashore north of Kinnaird Head, Aberdeenshire. Her crew were rescued by the Fraserburgh Lifeboat Havelock ( Royal National Lifeboat Institution) and by rocket apparatus. She was on a voyage from Arkhangelsk, Russia to Dundee, Forfarshire. She was refloated on 10 October and taken in to Fraserburgh the next day.
Zehandabhir	Ottoman Empire	The ship was wrecked at "La Nouville".

== 2 October ==
List of shipwrecks: 2 October 1869
Ship	State	Description
Derwent	United Kingdom	The steamship was driven ashore on Saaremaa, Russia. Her crew were rescued. She was on a voyage from Cardiff, Glamorgan to Kronstadt, Russia.
Fuchsia	United Kingdom	The schooner sprang a leak and was beached at Grimsby, Lincolnshire.
Gallovidian	United Kingdom	The barque sprang a leak and capsized in the Clyde at Greenock, Renfrewshire. She was righted on 6 October.
Harry Bluff	New Zealand	The 11-ton cutter ran aground on a bar at Charleston, New Zealand, with the loss of two crew.
William and Hannah	United Kingdom	The ship ran aground on the Schulpenplaat. She was on a voyage from Rotterdam, South Holland, Netherlands to Sunderland, County Durham.

== 3 October ==
List of shipwrecks: 3 October 1869
Ship	State	Description
Bella Maria	United Kingdom	The ship departed from Holyhead, Anglesey for Bombay, India. No further trace, presumed foundered with the loss of all hands.
Ceres	United Kingdom	The brig was wrecked near "Killehusen", Sweden. Her crew were rescued. She was on a voyage from Gävle, Sweden to Hartlepool, County Durham.
Jubilee	(United Kingdom of Great Britain and Ireland) Guernsey	The brig struck the Hump Rocks, between Herm and Sark, Channel Islands and foundered. Her crew were rescued. She was on a voyage from Guernsey to South Shields, County Durham.

== 4 October ==
List of shipwrecks: 4 October 1869
Ship	State	Description
Inarime	United Kingdom	The ship was wrecked on the London Reefs, in the South China Sea. Six of her crew were reported missing. She was on a voyage from Foo Chow Foo, China to London.
Susannah	United Kingdom	The ship was wrecked on Mount Desert Island, Maine, United States. She was on a voyage from Bear River, Canada to King's Lynn, Norfolk.

== 5 October ==
List of shipwrecks: 5 October 1869
Ship	State	Description
Agamenmnon	United Kingdom	The ship ran aground on the Beaumont Shoal, in the Saint Lawrence River. She was on a voyage from Quebec City, Canada to Liverpool, Lancashire. She was refloated.
Anna Mary	United Kingdom	The ship ran aground on the Beaumont Shoal. She was on a voyage from Amlwch, Anglesey to Quebec City.
Juanine	United Kingdom	The ship was wrecked on the East London Reef, in the South China Sea. Her fourteen crew took to two boats; they were rescued by the full-rigged ship St. Yeves (France) and the barque Bonito (Hamburg) on 9 and 17 October respectively. Juanine was on a voyage from Foo Chow, China to London.
Maria	United Kingdom	The schooner was run into by the schooner Frenetta (Sweden) and sank 20 nautical miles (37 km) east of Bornholm, Denmark with the loss of five of her six crew. The survivor was rescued by Frenetta. Maria was on a voyage from Hull, Yorkshire to Saint Petersburg, Russia.
William	United Kingdom	The schooner struck the Blennick Rock. She was on a voyage from Gloucester to Sligo. She completed her voyage in a leaky condition.

== 6 October ==
List of shipwrecks: 6 October 1869
Ship	State	Description
Caroline	United Kingdom	The schooner foundered off the Bishop Rock, Isles of Scilly. One crew member was rescued by Sarah Ann Dickinson (United Kingdom). Caroline was on a voyage from Poole, Dorset to Runcorn, Cheshire.
Hariett	United Kingdom	The steamship ran aground at Whitby, Yorkshire. She was on a voyage Middlesbrough, Yorkshire to Rotterdam, South Holland, Netherlands. She was refloated and resumed her voyage.
Jeus Ruffen	Norway	The ship departed from Christiania for an English port. Presumed subsequently foundered; a lifebuoy washed up at Büsum, Prussia on 15 November.
Norton	Newfoundland Colony	The ship was driven ashore at Belfast, County Antrim, United Kingdom.

== 7 October ==
List of shipwrecks: 7 October 1869
Ship	State	Description
Adele Stephanie	France	The schooner ran aground on the Whitton Sand, in the Humber and capsized with the loss of four of the eight people on board. Survivors were rescued by the tug Prudhoe (United Kingdom). Adele Stephanie was on a voyage form L'Aiguillon-sur-Mer, Vendée to Goole, Yorkshire, United Kingdom.
Anna	Prussia	The schooner collided with a barque and sank in the Swin. Her crew were rescued by the barque and Lizzie Mordue (United Kingdom). Anna was on a voyage from Rostock to London, United Kingdom.
Capri	United Kingdom	The steamship foundered in the Black Sea 22 nautical miles (41 km) off the entrance to the Bosphorus with the loss of sixteen of her 22 crew. She was on the return leg of her maiden voyage, from Odesa, Russia to North Shields, Northumberland.
Economy	United Kingdom	The brig foundered off the Smalls Lighthouse, Cornwall. Her crew were rescued by the tug Resolute (United Kingdom). Economy was on a voyage from Llanelly, Glamorgan to London.
Louisa	United Kingdom	The ship caught fire off Exmouth, Devon. She was on a voyage from Exeter, Devon to London.
Thomas W. Black	United Kingdom	The ship was damaged by fire at Maryport, Cumberland.

== 8 October ==
List of shipwrecks: 8 October 1869
Ship	State	Description
Adèle Stephanie	France	The schooner ran aground on the Wilton Sand, in the Humber and capsized with the loss of four lives. She was on a voyage from L'Aiguillon-sur-Mer, Vendée to Goole, Yorkshire, United Kingdom.
Azof	United Kingdom	The brig was driven ashore and wrecked at Montevideo, Uruguay. Her crew were rescued.
Hannah	United Kingdom	The brig was driven ashore and wrecked at "Kylon". She was on a voyage form Hörnefors, Sweden to Leith, Lothian.
La Mer	France	The ship ran aground near "Snazebek". She was on a voyage from Riga, Russia to Bayonne, Basses-Pyrénées.
Leipzic	Prussia	The steamship ran aground and sank off "Seicroe Island", in the Great Belt. She was on a voyage from West Hartlepool, County Durham, United Kingdom to Kiel.
Marianople	United Kingdom	The barque ran aground near Oyster Island, County Sligo. She was on a voyage from Constanţa, Ottoman Empire to a British port. She was refloated and beached at Sligo, but capsized
Sarah Elizabeth	United States	The ship was driven ashore on Fire Island, New York. She was on a voyage from Buenos Aires, Argentina to New York City.
Voltaic	United Kingdom	The steamship ran aground on the Calf of Man, Isle of Man. She was on a voyage from Belfast, County Antrim to Liverpool, Lancashire. She floated off and resumed her voyage.

== 9 October ==
List of shipwrecks: 9 October 1869
Ship	State	Description
Arthur White	United Kingdom	The ship collided with the steamship Denmark (United Kingdom) and was abandoned by her eleven crew, who were rescued by Denmark. Twelve crew of Denmark boarded Arthur White and took her in to Queenstown, County Cork in a waterlogged condition.
Brazilian	United Kingdom	The brig was driven ashore at Broadstairs, Kent. She was refloated and taken in to The Downs.
Camilla	United Kingdom	The ship departed from "Ambrizotti", on the Congo River for Liverpool, Lancashire. No further trace, presumed foundered with the loss of all hands.
Capri	United Kingdom	The steamship foundered at the entrance to the Bosphorus with the loss of seventeen of her 24 crew. She was on a voyage from Odesa, Russia to an English port.
Orient	United Kingdom	The ship ran aground, capsized and was wrecked at Nud Point, in the Hooghly River with the loss of three of her crew. She was on a voyage from Calcutta, India to Liverpool.

== 10 October ==
List of shipwrecks: 10 October 1869
Ship	State	Description
Fourth November	Norway	The brig ran aground on the Hamburg Sands and was abandoned by her crew, who were rescued by the steamship Dagmar ( Danzig). Fourth November was on a voyage from Sunderland, County Durham, United Kingdom to Hamburg.
Kinghorn	United Kingdom	The steamship was driven ashore at Flamborough Head, Yorkshire.
Lillian	United Kingdom	The steamship sank at Nassau, Bahamas.
Maggie Maxwell	United Kingdom	The brig was wrecked on St Clement's Isle, Cornwall. She was on a voyage from Cardiff, Glamorgan to Penzance, Cornwall.
Royal Standard	United Kingdom	The full-rigged ship was wrecked on a sandbank 20 to 25 nautical miles (37 to 46 km) off Cape São Thomé, Brazil with the loss of eight of about 80 people on board. A raft containing twelve people on board reached the Brazilian coast. She was on a voyage from London to Melbourne, Victoria. Twenty-four people reached land in the ship's cutter, and a number of survivors were rescued by Amelia (Portugal).

== 11 October ==
List of shipwrecks: 11 October 1869
Ship	State	Description
Adonis	Flag unknown	The barque was driven ashore and wrecked at Montevideo, Uruguay. Her crew were rescued.
Andrea Belzone	Argentina	The ship was wrecked at Montevideo. She was on a voyage from Buenos Aires to Antwerp, Belgium .
Azof	United Kingdom	The barque was wrecked at "Bucas", Uruguay.
Hortense	France	The schooner was destroyed by fire in the Scheldt.
Invierno	Uruguay	The lighter sank at Montevideo.
Opal	United Kingdom	The schooner departed from Cuxhaven for Stranraer, Wigtownshire. No further trace, presumed foundered with the loss of all hands.
Ottodini	United Kingdom	The barque capsized at Montevideo with the loss of a crew member.
Petrus	France	The schooner was driven ashore and wrecked at Montevideo. Her crew were rescued. she was on a voyage from Barcelona, Spain to Montevideo.
HMS Rapid	Royal Navy	The Rosario-class sloop was driven ashore in the Mediterranean Sea. Subsequently refloated, repaired and returned to service.
Stag	United Kingdom	The ship struck a submerged object and sprang a leak. She was on a voyage from Newcastle upon Tyne, Northumberland to Inverness. She put in to Peterhead, Aberdeenshire.
Unnamed	Italy	The barque was wrecked on the English Bank, in the River Plate with the loss of all hands.
Unnamed	United Kingdom	The barque was wrecked on the English Bank with the loss of all hands.

== 12 October ==
List of shipwrecks: 12 October 1869
Ship	State	Description
Arica	Italy	The barque was driven ashore and wrecked at Buenos Aires, Argentina. She was condemned.
Astrea	United Kingdom	The ship was driven ashore at Scarborough, Yorkshire. She was on a voyage from the River Tyne to London. She was refloated and taken in to Scarborough in a sinking condition.
Barcelo	Spain	The brig was driven ashore and wrecked at Buenos Aires.
Caledonia	United Kingdom	The ship was driven ashore at Whitehaven, Cumberland. She was on a voyage from Constanţa, Ottoman Empire to Whitehaven. She was refloated on 17 October and taken in to Whitehaven the next day.
Clara M. Grodrich	United States	The brig was driven ashore and wrecked at Buenos Aires.
Crimea	United States	The brig was driven ashore and wrecked at "Tigu", Argentina.
Doranna	Flag unknown	The schooner was driven ashore at Rosario, Argentina.
Eloisa	Italy	The barque was driven ashore and wrecked at Bueno Aires.
General Lee	United Kingdom	The ship was abandoned in the Atlantic Ocean 12 nautical miles (22 km) off the mouth of the River Plate. Her crew were rescued by a Danish brig. She was on a voyage from San Francisco, California, United States to Liverpool, Lancashire.
Giuseppe	Italy	The polacca was driven ashore and wrecked at Buenos Aires. She was on a voyage from Buenos Aires to Marseille, Bouches-du-Rhône, France.
Hanna	Denmark	The ship was driven ashore on the coast of Iceland.
Heloise	United Kingdom	The ship was driven ashore at Buenos Aires.
Henry	Austria-Hungary	The polacca was driven ashore and wrecked at Buenos Aires.
Jaime Fairer, or Jamie Ferrer	Spain	The brig was driven ashore and wrecked at Buenos Aires.
Juanita	United States	The brig was driven ashore and severely damaged at Rosario.
Jupiter	Norway	The brig was driven ashore on the coast of Banda Oriental, Uruguay.
Margaretha	Netherlands	The schooner was driven ashore and wrecked at Buenos Aires.
Maria	Flag unknown	The schooner was driven ashore at Buenos Aires. She was condemned.
Mary and Jane	United Kingdom	The schooner collided with the barque Boas (Norway) and foundered off the Galloper Sand, in the English Channel. Her crew were rescued. Mary and Jane was on a voyage from Portmadoc, Caernarfonshire to Hamburg. She was taken in to Ramsgate, Kent on 15 October in a derelict condition.
Minerva	United Kingdom	The brig was driven ashore and wrecked at Buenos Aires.
Morse	United Kingdom	The ship was driven ashore at Buenos Aires.
Narbel	United Kingdom	The barque was driven ashore at Buenos Aires.
Otodine	United Kingdom	The ship collided with Petrus (Flag unknown) and capsized at Buenos Aires.
Rosario	United Kingdom	The schooner was damaged at Buenos Aires.
Rossilo	Flag unknown	The ship was driven ashore and wrecked at Buenos Aires.
Ruffine	United Kingdom	The barque was wrecked on a reef off "Lampason Island". She was on a voyage from Shanghai, China to Hiogo, Japan.
Shannon	United Kingdom	The barque was wrecked in the River Plate.
St. Joseph	United Kingdom	The ship was driven ashore at Buenos Aires.
Tullochgorum	United Kingdom	The ship ran aground on Rattray Brig. She was refloated and put in to Sunderland, County Durham the next day.
Unico	Italy	The lugger was driven ashore and wrecked at Buenos Aires.
Valborg	Denmark	The ship was wrecked on the coast of Iceland.
Victoria	United Kingdom	The ship was driven ashore and wrecked at Buenos Aires.
Vidar	Norway	The ship was driven ashore and wrecked at Buenos Aires.
Unnamed	United Kingdom	The French or Italian barque ran aground on the English Bank, in the River Plate and sank with the loss of all hands.
Unnamed	Flag unknown	The brig was driven ashore and wrecked at Buenos Aires.

== 13 October ==
List of shipwrecks: 13 October 1869
Ship	State	Description
Caledonia	United Kingdom	The ship was driven ashore at Whitehaven, Cumberland. She was on a voyage from Constanţa, Ottoman Empire to Whitehaven.
Elizabeth Mary	United Kingdom	The schooner collided with an Italian barque and foundered in the English Channel 5 nautical miles (9.3 km) west of The Lizard, Cornwall. Her crew were rescued. She was on a voyage from Plymouth, Devon to Cardiff, Glamorgan.
Eva	United Kingdom	The schooner was run into by another vessel and foundered in the English Channel 10 nautical miles (19 km) off Exmouth, Devon. Her crew were rescued.
Orient	Newfoundland Colony	The brigantine was driven ashore and wrecked at Waterloo, Lancashire. She was on a voyage from Ardrossan, Ayrshire to Liverpool, Lancashire.
Planet	United Kingdom	The schooner was driven ashore at Redcar, Yorkshire. Her crew were rescued by a fishing coble. She was on a voyage from Newcastle upon Tyne, Northumberland to Schiedam, South Holland, Netherlands.
Ville de Nantes	France	The steamship collided with another vessel and sank. She was on a voyage from Havre de Grâce to Rouen, Seine-Inférieure.
Unnamed	United Kingdom	The brig foundered off Tönning, Prussia with the loss of all hands.

== 14 October ==
List of shipwrecks: 14 October 1869
Ship	State	Description
Eliza Ann	United Kingdom	The ship sprang a leak off Ailsa Craig and was beached at Lamlash, Isle of Arran. She was on a voyage from Belfast, County Antrim to Glasgow, Renfrewshire. She was placed under repair.
Elizabeth and Mary	United Kingdom	The ship collided with an Italian barque and was abandoned by her crew. She was on a voyage from Plymouth, Devon to Cardiff, Glamorgan. She was towed in to Falmouth, Cornwall the next day.
H. M. Elizabeth	United Kingdom	The ship was wrecked.
Jessies	United Kingdom	The ship was driven ashore. She was on a voyage from Inverness to Thurso, Caithness. She was refloated and put back to Inverness.
Johannes Kepler	United Kingdom	The ship caught fire and was scuttled in the Bosphorus.
Neptune's Bride	United Kingdom	The ship put in to Port Beaufort, Cape Colony on fire. Her crew left the ship and she sank the next day.
Planet	United Kingdom	The ship was driven ashore at Redcar, Yorkshire.

== 15 October ==
List of shipwrecks: 15 October 1869
Ship	State	Description
Diana	New Zealand	The 25-ton ketch caught fire and was destroyed in the Whanganui Inlet in New Zealand's South Island.
Orion	United Kingdom	The schooner was driven ashore and wrecked at Glenarm, County Antrim.
Ottoman	United Kingdom	The ship was driven ashore on Öland, Sweden. She was on a voyage from Kronstadt, Russia to London. She had been refloated by 20 October and taken in to Kalmar, Sweden for repairs.

== 16 October ==
List of shipwrecks: 16 October 1869
Ship	State	Description
Alexander	United Kingdom	The smack was driven ashore and severely damaged at Glenarm, County Antrim.
Brenda	United Kingdom	The brig was driven ashore and wrecked at Portmahomack, Ross-shire. Her crew were rescued.
Eary	United Kingdom	The brig foundered at the mouth of the River Plate with the loss of all but two of her crew. She was on a voyage from Newport, Monmouthshire to Montevideo. Uruguay.
Elwine	Kolberg	The ship was driven ashore at Rattray Head, Aberdeenshire. Her six crew were rescued by rocket apparatus. She was on a voyage from Kolberg to Wick, Caithness.
Friends	United Kingdom	The brig was driven ashore at North Shields, Northumberland. Her crew were rescued by the North Shields Lifeboat. She was on a voyage from Aberdeen to Middlesbrough, Yorkshire. She was refloated on 22 October and taken in to North Shields.
Glance	United Kingdom	The schooner was run into by a North German Federal Navy frigate in the River Thames and was abandoned by her crew, who were rescued by the frigate. Glance was on a voyage from London to Hull, Yorkshire. She was subsequently towed to Hull.
Gleaner	United Kingdom	The schooner was driven ashore at Porthdinllaen, Caernarfonshire. Her three crew were rescued by the Porthdinllaen Lifeboat Cotton Shepphard ( Royal National Lifeboat Institution). Gleaner was on a voyage from the River Duddon to Briton Ferry, Glamorgan.
Iduna	United Kingdom	The barque was driven ashore at Clee Ness, Lincolnshire. She was on a voyage from Alexandria, Egypt to Hull Yorkshire.
Lucie and Marguerite	France	The fishing lugger collided with a brig in The Downs and was abandoned by her 23 crew, her captain remaining on board. She was subsequently taken in to Ramsgate, Kent, United Kingdom.
Mathilde	Norway	The brig was wrecked at Tantallon Castle, Lothian. Her eight crew were rescued. She was on a voyage from Gävle, Sweden to Leith, Lothian.
Nymph	United Kingdom	The schooner was driven ashore and sank at Porthdinllaen. Her three crew were rescued by a gig. She was on a voyage from Barrow-in-Furness, Lancashire to Port Talbot, Glamorgan.
Philadelphia	United Kingdom	The sloop was driven ashore at Cove Haven, Forfarshire. Her crew were rescued by the Coastguard. She was on a voyage from Peterhead, Aberdeenshire to Methil, Fife.
Sea Horse	United Kingdom	The collier, a brig, was wrecked at the mouth of the River Tyne. Her crew were rescued by lifeboats. She was on a voyage from the River Tyne to Aberdeen.
Summer Cloud	United Kingdom	The fishing boat capsized in the North Sea off the coast of Yorkshire with the loss of all three crew.
Swan	United Kingdom	The Yorkshire Billyboy was driven ashore at Huttoft, Lincolnshire. All six people on board were rescued by the Sutton Lifeboat Birmingham ( Royal National Lifeboat Institution). Swan was on a voyage from Boston, Lincolnshire to Goole, Yorkshire.
Tequendama	United States of Colombia	The steamship ran aground in the Magdalena River.
Three Betseys	United Kingdom	The ship foundered off the north Norfolk coast. She was on a voyage from Wells-next-the-Sea, Norfolk to East Stockwith, Lincolnshire.
Tribune	United Kingdom	The brig was driven ashore and wrecked between Holmpton and Withernsea, Yorkshire with the loss of one of her seven crew. She was on a voyage from London to Sunderland, County Durham.
Union	United Kingdom	The schooner was driven ashore at Sunderland. Her crew were rescued. Her crew were rescued.Unionwas on a voyage from Arbroath, Forfarshire to Sunderland. She was refloated on 23 October and towed in to Sunderland.
Vicious	United Kingdom	The fishing smack was driven ashore and wrecked on the Long Scar Rocks, on the coast of County Durham with the loss of one of her four crew.
Unnamed	United Kingdom	The steamship was driven ashore at Caernarfon.

== 17 October ==
List of shipwrecks: 17 October 1869
Ship	State	Description
Æolus	Norway	The schooner was driven ashore at Stavanger. She was on a voyage from Haugesund to South Shields, County Durham, United Kingdom.
De Groot	Netherlands	The fishing smack was abandoned in the North Sea. Seven of her fifteen crew were rescued by the smack Confidence (United Kingdom). A Dutch fishing vessel attempted to rescue the other eight, but it was unclear whether or not the attempt was successful.
Diana	Belgium	The ship was driven ashore on Saaremaa, Russia.
Emilie	Sweden	The brig was abandoned 12 nautical miles (22 km) south south west of "Fingrundet". Her crew were rescued. She was on a voyage from "Swartwick" to Grimsby, Lincolnshire, United Kingdom.
Gipsey King	United Kingdom	The ship was wrecked on the Dulas Rocks, Anglesey with the loss of all but one of her crew. The survivor was rescued by the Moelfre Lifeboat London Sunday School ( Royal National Lifeboat Institution). Gipsey King was on a voyage from Liverpool, Lancashire to Glasgow, Renfrewshire.
Marys	United Kingdom	The schooner ran aground on the Black Middens, in the North Sea off the coast of County Durham. She was on a voyage from the River Tyne to Aberdeen. She was refloated and assisted in to South Shields, County Durham where she sank.
Pioneer	United Kingdom	The ship was wrecked on Holy Isle, in the Firth of Clyde.
Rio	United States	The ship was driven ashore on Saaremaa. She was on a voyage from New York to Saint Petersburg, Russia.
Rock Light	United Kingdom	The paddle tug was severely damaged by fire and was scuttled at South Shields, County Durham. Subsequently rebuilt and returned to service.
Sea Lark	United Kingdom	The yacht struck a submerged object and sank off Brighton, Sussex. All 40 people on board were rescued.
Seymour	United Kingdom	The ship was driven ashore on Utö, Grand Duchy of Finland. Her crew were rescued. She was on a voyage from Sundsvall, Sweden to Bridgwater, Somerset. She floated off and drifted out to sea.
Sierra Nevada	United States	The steamship was wrecked on a reef 3 nautical miles (5.6 km) north of "Pedro Blanco" (Piedras Blancas, California). All on board survived. She was on a voyage from San Francisco to San Luis Obispo, California with 45 passengers.
Thea Elpis	Greece	The brig was driven ashore and wrecked at Ballantrae, Ayrshire, United Kingdom. All eleven people on board were rescued.
Venice	France	The brig capsized and sank at South Shields. Her crew were rescued.
Vesta	Sweden	The schooner was driven ashore near Gravelines, Nord, France. Her crew were rescued. She was on a voyage from Newcastle upon Tyne, Northumberland to Messina, Sicily, Italy.
Victoria Tower	United Kingdom	The ship ran aground and was wrecked at Barwon Heads, Victoria. She was on a voyage from Liverpool to Melbourne, Victoria.

== 18 October ==
List of shipwrecks: 18 October 1869
Ship	State	Description
Adela	Spain	The barque was wrecked on the English Bank, in the River Plate with the loss of more than 40 lives. There were two survivors. She was on a voyage from Barcelona to Montevideo.
Alabama	Italy	The barque was in collision with the brig Captain (United Kingdom) and was then driven ashore and wrecked at Dungeness, Kent, United Kingdom. All fourteen people on board were rescued by the tug Middlesex (United Kingdom). Alabama was on a voyage from South Shields, County Durham, United Kingdom to Genoa.
Alida Hendrika	Netherlands	The ship foundered in the English Channel off Dover, Kent. Her crew were rescued. She was on a voyage from Liverpool, Lancashire, United Kingdom to Harlingen, Friesland.
Beulah	United Kingdom	The brigantine ran aground on the Gunfleet Sand, in the North Sea off the coast of Suffolk. She was refloated with assistance from the smack Aurora's Increase and beached at Harwich, Essex.
Electrofus	Sweden	The brig was abandoned in the North Sea off Texel, North Holland, Netherlands. Her crew were rescued by Alert (United Kingdom). Electrofus was on a voyage from Kronstadt, Russia to Southampton, Hampshire. United Kingdom.
Matilda	United Kingdom	The ship was driven ashore and wrecked at Porthdinllaen, Caernarfonshire. She was on a voyage from Gävle, Sweden to Leith, Lothian.
Ocianus	United Kingdom	The fishing smack was wrecked on the Longscar Rocks with the loss of one of her four crew.
Petrel	United Kingdom	The schooner was driven ashore and wrecked at "Ardow". She was on a voyage from Hull, Yorkshire to Garston, Lancashire.
Prince Albert	United Kingdom	The fishing smack foundered off the Well Bank, in the North Sea with the loss of all six crew.
Sarah	United Kingdom	The fishing smack was driven ashore and wrecked at Brancaster, Norfolk. Her crew were rescued.
Susan	United Kingdom	The ship was driven ashore at Dover, Kent. She was on a voyage from Hull, Yorkshire to Truro, Cornwall. She was refloated and taken in to Dover.
HMS Tamar	Royal Navy	The troopship ran aground off Paul's Island, Newfoundland Colony. She was refloated, repaired and returned to service.
Water Lily	United Kingdom	The fishing boat was abandoned in the North Sea off Newbiggin-by-the-Sea, Northumberland. Her six crew were rescued by the paddle tug Fiery Cross (United Kingdom), which towed Water Lily in to the River Tyne.
Unnamed	United Kingdom	The schooner ran aground and sank Taylor's Bank, in Liverpool Bay.

== 19 October ==
List of shipwrecks: 19 October 1869
Ship	State	Description
Alice Richardson	United Kingdom	The brig was driven ashore and wrecked at Holmpton, Yorkshire. Her crew were rescued by rocket apparatus. She was on a voyage from London to Sunderland, County Durham. She was refloated on 5 November and towed in to Grimsby, Lincolnshire.
Amalie	Denmark	The schooner was driven ashore at Grimsby. She was refloated on 21 October and towed in to Grimsby.
Belvidere	United Kingdom	The fishing smack foundered in the North Sea with the loss of all hands.
Bradford	Royal National Lifeboat Institution	The lifeboat ran aground on the Goodwin Sands, Kent whilst going to the assistance of Frank Shaw (United Kingdom). She was refloated and completed her mission.
Carl von Truenfells	Rostock	The brig was driven ashore at Grimsby. Her crew were rescued. She was on a voyage from Grimsby to South Shields, County Durham, United Kingdom. She was refloated on 20 October and taken in to Grimsby.
Dependent	United Kingdom	The brig was wrecked near Withernsea, Yorkshire.
Dido	United Kingdom	The ship sprang a leak and sank in the North Sea off the coast of Essex. Her crew were rescued. She was on a voyage from Harwich, Essex to Faversham, Kent.
Elephant	United Kingdom	The Mersey Flat ran aground and sank off Crosby, Lancashire with the loss of one of her two crew. The survivor was rescued by the New Brighton Lifeboat.
Enchantress	United Kingdom	The Yorkshire Billyboy was driven ashore at Cleethorpes, Lincolnshire. All three people on board were rescued by the salvage boat Mariner's Friend (United Kingdom). Enchantress was on a voyage from King's Lynn, Norfolk to Keadby, Lincolnshire. She was refloated on 22 October and taken in to Grimsby in a severely damaged condition.
Endeavour	United Kingdom	The sloop was driven ashore and wrecked at Brancaster, Norfolk. Her crew were rescued. She was on a voyage from Ipswich, Suffolk to Newcastle upon Tyne, Northumberland.
Europa	United Kingdom	The ship was driven ashore at Grimsby. She was refloated on 21 October and towed in to Grimsby.
Frank Shaw	United Kingdom	The collier ran aground on the Goodwin Sands, Kent and was wrecked with the loss of eight of the 28 people on board. Survivors were rescued by the Broadstairs Lifeboat Samuel Morrison Collins and the Ramsgate Lifeboat Bradford (both Royal National Lifeboat Institution) or reached shore in a boat. Frank Shaw was on a voyage from South Shields, County Durham to Genoa, Italy.
Frithjof	Prussia	The brig was driven ashore and wrecked on Terschelling, Friesland, Netherlands. She was on a voyage from Skellefteå, Sweden to Gloucester, United Kingdom.
Gipsey King	United Kingdom	The schooner was wrecked on the Formby Spit, in Liverpool Bay with the loss of all hands.
Glenalbyn	United Kingdom	On a voyage from London to Newcastle-on-Tyne in ballast, the schooner was driven ashore on Garton Beach, north of Withernsea, in a gale and the crew landed. She was later refloated, repaired and for sale.
Hannah	United Kingdom	The schooner was wrecked on the Gunfleet Sand, in the North Sea off the coast of Suffolk. Her crew were rescued.
Hansa	Hamburg	The ship was crushed by ice and sank off the coast of Greenland. Her crew were rescued.
Harmonie	Norway	The brig was damaged at Grimsby.
Havelock	United Kingdom	The collier, a barque, sank at Grimsby, Lincolnshire. Her crew were rescued. She was refloated on 25 October and found to be severely damaged.
Hero	United Kingdom	The schooner was driven ashore and wrecked at Burnham Overy Staithe, Norfolk. Her crew were rescued.
Independent	United Kingdom	The ship was driven ashore and wrecked at Cowden, Yorkshire. Shew as on a voyage from London to Sunderland.
Industrie	Netherlands	The ship foundered off Lisbon, Portugal. Her crew were rescued by Uoader do Mondego (Portugal). Industrie was on a voyage from Newcastle upon Tyne to Genoa, Italy.
Irma	France	The chasse-marée collided with a Swedish brig off Great Yarmouth, Norfolk and foundered with the loss of all but two of her crew. Survivors were rescued by the brig.
Jane	United Kingdom	The schooner was driven ashore and wrecked at Deal, Kent. Her four crew were rescued. She was on a voyage from London to Honfleur, Manche, France.
John	United Kingdom	The schooner was driven ashore and wrecked at Saltburn-by-the-Sea, North Riding of Yorkshire with the loss of all hands.
John and Mary	United Kingdom	The brig was driven ashore and wrecked at Morston, Norfolk. Her nine crew were rescued by the Blakeney Lifeboat Brightwell ( Royal National Lifeboat Institution). John and Mary was on a voyage from Havre de Grâce, Seine-Inférieure, France to South Shields.
John James	United Kingdom	The smack was driven ashore at Aberdovey, Merionethshire. Her crew were rescued by the Aberdovey Lifeboat Royal Berkshire ( Royal National Lifeboat Institution). John James was on a voyage from Dublin to Aberdovey. She was subsequently taken in to Aberdovey by Royal Berkshire.
Josephine	United Kingdom	The barque was driven ashore and wrecked at Broxham, Lothian with the loss of four of her fifteen crew. She was on a voyage from Quebec City, Canada to Grangemouth, Stirlingshire.
Lucie	United Kingdom	The smack was damaged at Grimsby.
Marathon	United Kingdom	The ship sprang a leak and was beached at Tongue, Sutherland. She was on a voyage from Quebec City to Sunderland.
Mary	United Kingdom	The schooner ran aground on the Black Middens, in the North Sea off the mouth of the River Tees. She was refloated with the assistance of the paddle tug Robin Hood (United Kingdom and taken in to South Shields in a leaky condition, where she sank.
Mary	United Kingdom	The schooner sank in the River Tyne.
Mauritz	Prussia	The brig was wrecked at Manhaven, County Durham with the loss of nine of her ten crew. She was on a voyage from Shoreham-by-Sea, Sussex, United Kingdom to the River Tyne.
Odin	Flag unknown	The schooner was driven ashore at Grimsby.
Olive	United Kingdom	The schooner was driven ashore at Grimsby.
Pet	United Kingdom	The schooner was driven ashore and damaged at Dymchurch, Kent.
Pioneer	United Kingdom	The smack was damaged at Grimsby.
Rob Roy	United Kingdom	The schooner was driven ashore at Grimsby. She was refloated on 21 October and towed in to Grimsby.
Samuel Morrison Collins	Royal National Lifeboat Institution	The lifeboat ran aground on the Goodwin Sands whilst going to the assistance of Frank Shaw (United Kingdom). She was refloated and completed her mission.
Svalen	Norway	The barque was abandoned in the Atlantic Ocean. Her crew were rescued. She was on a voyage from Quebec City, Canada to London.
Thomas and Henry	United Kingdom	The fishing smack foundered off the Lemon Sand, in the North Sea with the loss of all six crew.
Trusty	United Kingdom	The sloop was driven ashore and wrecked at Runton, Norfolk. Her three crew were rescued by the Sheringham Lifeboat Duncan ( Royal National Lifeboat Institution).
Twins	United Kingdom	The fishing smack was abandoned off the Outer Dowsing Sandbank, in the North Sea. Her five crew were rescued by the smack Criterion (United Kingdom).
Vesper	United Kingdom	The ship driven ashore at the mouth of the River Tees with the loss of two of her crew. She was on a voyage from Gävle, Sweden to Hartlepool, County Durham.
Viscaya	Norway	The barque was driven ashore at North Killingholme, Lincolnshire. She was on a voyage from Kronstadt, Russia to Hull, Yorkshire, United Kingdom.
Four unnamed vessels	Flags unknown	The ships were driven ashore at Grimsby.
Nine unnamed vessels	Flags unknown	The ships, a brig, three schooners and five smacks were driven ashore at Cleethorpes Their crews were rescued. The salvage boat Mariner's Friend (United Kingdom rescued seven crew from one of the schooners.
Two unnamed vessels	United Kingdom	Two pilot cobles were reported missing having departed from the River Tyne.
Unnamed	United Kingdom	The barque was driven ashore at Stallingborough, Lincolnshire.

== 20 October ==
List of shipwrecks: 20 October 1869
Ship	State	Description
Amphitrite, and Hamsterley Hall	United Kingdom	The brig Amphitrite collided with the brig Hamsterley Hall at Grimsby, Lincolnshire. She was driven ashore at Donna Nook and wrecked. She was on a voyage from London to South Shields, County Durham. Hamsterley Hall was driven ashore and wrecked with the loss of her pilot. Survivors were rescued by the Donna Nook Lifeboat North Briton ( Royal National Lifeboat Institution). She was on a voyage from Kronstadt, Russia to Hull, Yorkshire.
Amphitrite	United Kingdom	The brig was abandoned in the North Sea off the coast of Suffolk. Her crew were rescued by the Gorleston Lifeboat. Amphitrite was on a voyage from South Shields to London. She was subsequently taken in to Lowestoft, Suffolk
Araxes	United Kingdom	The steamship foundered off the Lemon and Ower Sand, in the North Sea off the coast of Norfolk with the loss of two of her 24 crew. Survivors were rescued by the fishing smack Lizzie (United Kingdom). Araxes was on a voyage from Kronstadt to London.
Argo	Netherlands	The schooner foundered in the Dogger Bank with the loss of three of her six crew. She was on a voyage from a Baltic port to Harlingen, Friesland.
Blue Jacket	United Kingdom	The schooner was driven ashore, capsized and was wrecked at Donna Nook with the loss of all eleven people on board.
Diana	United Kingdom	The whaler was driven ashore and wrecked at Donna Nook. Her 26 crew were rescued by the lifeboat North Briton ( Royal National Lifeboat Institution).
Emma	France	The ship ran aground on the Shipwash Sand, in the North Sea off the coast of Suffolk, United Kingdom and sank. Her crew were rescued. She was on a voyage from Cherbourg, Seine-Inférieure to West Hartlepool, County Durham, United Kingdom.
Enchantress	United Kingdom	The ship was driven ashore and wrecked at Holkham, Norfolk with the loss of all hands.
Envoy	United Kingdom	The schooner was driven ashore at Saltfleet, Lincolnshire. Her crew were rescued.
Euphemia	United Kingdom	The ship was driven ashore at Le Tréport, Seine-Inférieure, France. She was on a voyage from Sunderland, County Durham to Eu, Seine-Inférieure.
Exampler	United Kingdom	The ship was driven ashore. She was on a voyage from South Shields to Waterford. She was refloated and taken in to King's Lynn, Norfolk.
George	Denmark	The barque was abandoned in the North Sea off the coast of Yorkshire. Her crew were rescued by the fishing yawl Princess Royal (United Kingdom). George was on a voyage from Sunderland to the River Tyne. She was subsequently towed in to Grimsby the next day.
Glaslyn	United Kingdom	The ship was sighted off Bridlington, Yorkshire whilst on a voyage from "Champs", France to Leith, Lothian. No further trace, presumed foundered with the loss of all hands.
Harlequin	United Kingdom	The smack collided with a steamship and was driven ashore at Grimsby with the loss of two of her crew. She subsequently became a wreck.
Jane Gray	United Kingdom	The barque was driven ashore 1 nautical mile (1.9 km) east of Burnham Overy Staithe, Norfolk. Her crew were rescued.
Johanne Elizabeth	United Kingdom	The ship was driven ashore and wrecked at Thisted, Denmark. She was on a voyage from Liverpool, Lancashire to Saint Petersburg, Russia.
John	United Kingdom	The ship was driven ashore and wrecked at Donna Nook. She was on a voyage from Exeter, Devon to Hartlepool, County Durham.
Mina	Netherlands	The ship departed from Kronstadt for Helsingør, Denmark. Although subsequently sighted off Hogland having developed a list, she never arrived at her destination. Presumed foundered in the Baltic Sea with the loss of all hands.
Paix	France	The lugger was driven ashore and wrecked at East Newton, Yorkshire, United Kingdom. Her crew were rescued.
Palladium	United Kingdom	The brig was abandoned in the North Sea off the coast of Suffolk. Her crew were rescued by the Gorleston Lifeboat. She was on a voyage from South Shields to Rotterdam, South Holland, Netherlands. She was subsequently taken in to Lowestoft.
Paul Vietschow	Rostock	The brig was driven ashore at Grimsby. She was on a voyage from Rostock to Leith. She had sunk by 31 October. Paul Vietschow was refloated on 24 November and taken in to Grimsby.
Pearl	United Kingdom	The schooner was driven ashore at Tetney Haven, Lincolnshire. She was on a voyage from Salcombe, Devon to Hull.
Princess	United Kingdom	The steamship was abandoned in the North Sea off Flamborough Head, Yorkshire. Her crew were rescued.
Ravensworth	United Kingdom	The brig was driven ashore and wrecked at Blakeney, Norfolk. Her six crew were rescued by the Blakeney Lifeboat Brightwell ( Royal National Lifeboat Institution). Ravensworth was on a voyage from Riga, Russia to Hartlepool, County Durham, or from Hartlepool to Vyborg, Grand Duchy of Finland.
Stella	United Kingdom	The schooner was driven ashore at Happisburgh, Norfolk. her crew were rescued by the coastguard using rocket apparatus.
Svea	Flag unknown	The ship was wrecked near Lemvig, Denmark. She was on a voyage from Riga, Russia to Amsterdam, North Holland, Netherlands.
Sydney Jones	United Kingdom	The ship was wrecked on Düne, Heligoland. Her crew were rescued. She was on a voyage from Portmadoc, Caernarfonshire to Brake, Prussia.
Vedra	United Kingdom	The brig ran aground and sank in the North Sea off Bawdsey, Suffolk. Her crew were rescued by the steamship Ludworth (United Kingdom). Vedra was on a voyage from Kronstadt to London. She was later refloated but broke up.
Wingate Grange	United Kingdom	The brigantine was driven ashore and wrecked at Salthouse, Norfolk. Her crew were rescued.
Unnamed	France	The schooner was driver ashore at Donna Nook with the loss of all hands, seven or eight lives.
Unnamed	Flag unknown	The koff was abandoned in the North Sea. Her crew were rescued by a British fishing cutter.

== 21 October ==
List of shipwrecks: 21 October 1869
Ship	State	Description
Æolus	United Kingdom	The schooner struck a sunken wreck. She was on a voyage from Kronstadt, Russia to Wisbech, Cambridgeshire. She put in to Helsingør, Denmark in a leaky condition.
Anne Marie	United Kingdom	The ship was driven ashore at Thisted, Denmark.
Bertha	United Kingdom	The ship was driven ashore on Naissaar, Russia. She was on a voyage from Saint Petersburg, Russia to Arbroath, Forfarshire. She had been refloated by 22 October.
Clio	United Kingdom	The ship was wrecked at Dagerort, Russia.
Conrad	United Kingdom	The ship was lost at Busum, Prussia.
Defendant	United Kingdom	The ship was wrecked at "Bowdon". She was on a voyage from London to Sunderland, County Durham.
Erma	United Kingdom	The ship ran aground on the Shipwash Sand, in the North Sea off the coast of Suffolk and sank. She was on a voyage from Benin City, Africa to West Hartlepool, County Durham.
HMS Forte	Royal Navy	The Imperieuse-class frigate ran aground at Cape Guardafui, Majerteen Sultanate whist in pursuit of Arab dhows and was severely damaged.
Genova	United Kingdom	The steamship was driven ashore at "Cape Willano". She was on a voyage from Cardiff, Glamorgan to Gibraltar.
Johannes	Sweden	The schooner ran aground on Skagen, Denmark and sank. Her crew were rescued. She was on a voyage from Ängelholm to Hull, Yorkshire, United Kingdom.
Josephine	United Kingdom	The ship was driven ashore and wrecked at Boulogne, Pas-de-Calais, France. She was on a voyage from Middlesbrough, Yorkshire to Trieste.
Peep o' Day	United Kingdom	The ship sprang a leak and foundered off Villareal, Spain. Her crew survived. she was on a voyage from Villareal to Liverpool, Lancashire.
Queen	United Kingdom	The ship was wrecked on the Dutch coast.
Severn	United Kingdom	The ship departed from Gibraltar for Genoa, Italy. No further trace, presumed foundered in the Mediterranean Sea with the loss of all hands.

== 22 October ==
List of shipwrecks: 22 October 1869
Ship	State	Description
Clifton	United Kingdom	The steamship ran aground near Helsinki, Grand Duchy of Finland. She was on a voyage from Middlesbrough, Yorkshire to Helsinki. She was refloated and taken in to Helsinki for repairs.
Faith	United Kingdom	The brig was driven ashore at Hurst Castle, Hampshire. She was on a voyage from Newcastle upon Tyne, Northumberland to Poole, Dorset. She was refloated the next day with the assistance of a tug.
Gustav Wallensius	Flag unknown	The barque was wrecked on the Northern Triangles Reef. She was on a voyage from Belize City, British Honduras to Queenstown, County Cork, United Kingdom.
Ludwig Gadd	United Kingdom	The paddle steamer departed from Malta for Taganrog, Russia. No further trace, presumed foundered with the loss of all hands.
Miss Victoria	United Kingdom	The schooner foundered in the Victoria Channel. Her crew got aboard the Formby Lightship ( Trinity House).
Neptune	United Kingdom	The brig was wrecked on Bornholm, Denmark. Her crew were rescued. She was on a voyage from Vyborg, Grand Duchy of Finland to Ipswich, Suffolk.
Resolution	Norway	The ship was abandoned in the North Sea. Her crew were rescued. She was on a voyage from Gävle, Sweden to Littlehampton, Sussex, United Kingdom. She was taken in to the Nieuw Diep in a derelict condition.

== 23 October ==
List of shipwrecks: 23 October 1869
Ship	State	Description
Andalusia	United Kingdom	The steamship caught fire at Leith, Lothian and was scuttled.
Cas	Ottoman Empire	The ship was driven ashore on the Dutch coast.
Columbine	United Kingdom	The derelict ship came ashore in a capsized condition at Bridlington, Yorkshire with a dead crewman on board. She was presumed to have capsized in the recent gale with the loss of all hands. She was refloated the next day and taken in to Bridlington.
Emerald	United Kingdom	The ship sprang a leak and was beached off Herne Bay, Kent. Her crew were rescued. She was on a voyage from London to Poole, Dorset. She was later refloated and taken in to Faversham, Kent.
Juno	United Kingdom	The ship was abandoned at Lemvig, Denmark.
Leon Crespo	Brazil	The ship put in to Rio de Janeiro on fire. She was on a voyage from Swansea, Glamorgan to Cobija.
Mystery	United Kingdom	The pilot cutter collided with the tug Ely (United Kingdom) and sank in the Bristol Channel. Her crew were rescued.
Rosebud	United Kingdom	The schooner was driven ashore and wrecked near Kyrkesund, Sweden with the loss of three of her four crew. She was on a voyage from Tayport, Fife to Königsberg, Prussia.
Saxon	United Kingdom	The ship struck the pier at Ramsgate, Kent, pushing her anchor through her bows. She was on a voyage from Härnösand, Sweden to Penzance, Cornwall. She was taken in to Ramsgate in a leaky condition.
Syringa	United Kingdom	The barque was beached on Banen Island in a sinking condition. She was on a voyage from Liverpool, Lancashire, to Yokohama, Japan. She was refloated with assistance from a steamship and taken in to Batavia, Netherlands East Indies.
Twee Gebruder	Flag unknown	The smack was abandoned in the North Sea. Her crew were rescued by a smack. She was on a voyage from Sunderland, County Durham, United Kingdom to Helsingborg, Sweden. She was taken in to Grimsby, Lincolnshire, United Kingdom in a derelict condition.

== 24 October ==
List of shipwrecks: 24 October 1869
Ship	State	Description
Echo	United Kingdom	The steamship was sighted off Skagen, Denmark whilst on a voyage from Saint Petersburg, Russia to Hull, Yorkshire. No further trace, presumed foundered with the loss of all eighteen crew.
Emma	Prussia	The ship departed from Middlesbrough, Yorkshire for Riga, Russia. No further trace, presumed foundered with the loss of all hands.
Ossian	United Kingdom	The steamship collided with the steamship Clairmont (United Kingdom) and sank with the loss of eleven of the 29 people on board. Ossian was on a voyage from Copenhagen, Denmark to Newcastle upon Tyne, Northumberland.
Wim Griffiths	United Kingdom	The sloop was driven ashore at Eyemouth, Berwickshire. She was on a voyage from Eyemouth to Newton.
Unnamed	United Kingdom	The schooner sank on the Zebra Flats, in Liverpool Bay.

== 25 October ==
List of shipwrecks: 25 October 1869
Ship	State	Description
Alexander	France	The brig ran aground on the Haisborough Sands, in the North Sea off the coast of Norfolk, United Kingdom. Her crew were rescued. She was on a voyage from Norway to Brest, Finistère.
Andronica	Flag unknown	The ship sank near Tulcea, Ottoman Empire.
Anna	United Kingdom	The ship was lost at Ciboure, Basses-Pyrénées.
Champion	United Kingdom	The ship was driven ashore at Lymington, Hampshire. She was on a voyage from A Coruña, Spain to Portsmouth, Hampshire. She was refloated.
Crawshaw Bailey	United States	The ship departed from Batavia, Netherlands East Indies for San Francisco, California. No further trace, presumed foundered with the loss of all hands.
Engelina	Prussia	The ship was abandoned at sea.
Fortune	United Kingdom	The ship was lost at Ciboure.
Indefatigable	Norway	The brig was abandoned in the North Sea. Her crew were rescued. She was on a voyage from Arendal to Dunkirk, Nord, France.
Industrie	United Kingdom	The ship foundered off Lowestoft, Suffolk. She was on a voyage from South Shields, County Durham to Genoa, Italy.
Jessie Greig	United Kingdom	The ship departed from Newcastle upon Tyne, Northumberland for Rio de Janeiro, Brazil. Presumed foundered in the North Sea with the loss of all hands; wreckage from the ship washed up on the Dutch coast.
Pauline and Julie	France	The ship sank at Bayonne, Basses-Pyrénées.
Rose	France	The ship was driven ashore at Odesa, Russia.
Strathspey	United Kingdom	The ship foundered. She was on a voyage from San Francisco, California, United States to Queenstown, County Cork.
Supply	United Kingdom	The brig was abandoned off Thurso, Caithness. Her seven crew were rescued by the Thurso Lifeboat Polly ( Royal National Lifeboat Institution). Supply was on a voyage from Leith, Lothian to Barcelona, Spain.
Vernon	United Kingdom	The ship ran aground at Hantoon, County Wexford. She was on a voyage from Dublin to Hantoon. She was refloated.
Unnamed	France	The ship was driven against the quayside at Oran, Algeria and was wrecked.

== 26 October ==
List of shipwrecks: 26 October 1869
Ship	State	Description
Active	United Kingdom	The schooner was driven ashore and wrecked at Lemvig, Denmark.
Christine	Rostock	The ship was taken in to Cuxhaven in a derelict condition. She was on a voyage from Vindava, Courland Governorate to Hartlepool, County Durham, United Kingdom. She was subsequently condemned.
David	United Kingdom	The smack foundered off Fishguard, Pembrokeshire. Her three crew were rescued by the Fishguard Lifeboat Sir Edward Perrott ( Royal National Lifeboat Institution).
Eden	United Kingdom	The schooner put in to Troon, Ayrshire on fire. She capsized and sank. Her crew were rescued. She was on a voyage from Larne, County Antrim to the Clyde.
Ellen	United Kingdom	The schooner was driven ashore and wrecked at Scarborough, Yorkshire. Her six crew were rescued by rocket apparatus.
Hecla, or Heckler	United Kingdom	The ketch ran aground and sank off Fraserburgh, Aberdeenshire. Her crew were rescued by the Fraserburgh Lifeboat Havelock ( Royal National Lifeboat Institution). The ketch was on a voyage from Lossiemouth, Moray to Fraserburgh. She was on a voyage from Hopeman, Moray to Fraserburgh.
Horsa	Denmark	The steamship foundered in the North Sea off Grimsby, Lincolnshire, United Kingdom with the loss of two of her crew. She was on a voyage Aarhus to Newcastle upon Tyne, Northumberland, United Kingdom.
Lector Voss	Sweden	The ship was driven ashore and wrecked on Terschelling, Friesland, Netherlands. Her crew were rescued. She was on a voyage from Ljusne to Southampton, Hampshire, United Kingdom.
Newnham	United Kingdom	The smack foundered in the Bristol Channel with the loss of both crew. She was on a voyage from Padstow, Cornwall to St Catherine's Island, Pembrokeshire.
Pride of the Arun	United Kingdom	The ship was abandoned off Cádiz, Spain. Her crew were rescued by an Ottoman steamship. She was on a voyage from the Clyde to Alexandria, Egypt.
St. Tudwall	United Kingdom	The smack was driven ashore at Bodfean, Caernarfonshire.
Two Sisters	United Kingdom	The schooner was abandoned off Fishguard. Her three crew were rescued by the Fishguard Lifeboat Sir Edward Perrott ( Royal National Lifeboat Institution). She sank the next day.
Victory	United Kingdom	The schooner was driven ashore near Larne, County Antrim. She was on a voyage from Caernarfon to Peterhead, Aberdeenshire.
Unnamed	United Kingdom	The schooner foundered off Fishguard. Her crew were rescued.
Unnamed	United Kingdom	The steamship foundered in the North Sea 5 nautical miles (9.3 km) off Cromer, Norfolk.

== 27 October ==
List of shipwrecks: 27 October 1869
Ship	State	Description
Bartolomeo Cerruti	Italy	The barque was driven ashore and wrecked at Donna Nook, Lincolnshire, United Kingdom. Her nineteen crew were rescued by the Donna Nook Lifeboat North Briton ( Royal National Lifeboat Institution). She was on a voyage from Hull to South Shields, County Durham, United Kingdom.
Bonnie Lass	United Kingdom	The fishing smack foundered in the North Sea with the loss of all six crew.
Breadalbane	Canada	The ship was driven ashore and wrecked in Cow Bay, Nova Scotia.
Charlotte	United Kingdom	The ship was driven ashore and wrecked near "Skarloi". She was on a voyage from Riga, Russia to Leith, Lothian.
Criterion	United Kingdom	The ship was driven ashore at Lowestoft, Suffolk. She was refloated.
Diana	United Kingdom	The brig was driven ashore near Ayr. She was on a voyage from Londonderry to Troon, Ayrshire.
Echo	United Kingdom	The fishing smack foundered in the North Sea with the loss of all six crew.
Elizabeth	United Kingdom	The schooner foundered off Rhyl, Denbighshire with the loss of all hands.
Emilie	Prussia	The barque ran aground on the Goodwin Sands, Kent, United Kingdom. She was on a voyage from London to Sunderland, County Durham. She was refloated with assistance from the tug Aid (United Kingdom) and towed in to Ramsgate, Kent.
Gipsey Queen	United Kingdom	The steamship foundered in the North Sea off Heligoland. Her nine crew were rescued by a Dutch pilot cutter. She was on a voyage from Middlesbrough, Yorkshire to Hamburg.
Helen	United Kingdom	The schooner was driven ashore at Scarborough, Yorkshire. Her crew were rescued. She was on a voyage from Alloa, Clackmannanshire to Boulogne, Pas-de-Calais, France.
HMS Heron	Royal Navy	The Albacore-class gunboat collided with another vessel in the North Sea and was severely damaged. She put in to Great Yarmouth, Norfolk.
Ida	Canada	The ship was driven ashore and wrecked in Cow Bay.
Johannes	United Kingdom	The ship ran aground at Rosneath, Argyllshire. She was on a voyage from Glasgow, Renfrewshire to Montevideo, Uruguay.
Louisa	Canada	The ship was driven ashore and wrecked in Cow Bay.
Malcolm	United Kingdom	The ship was driven ashore at Lowestoft. She was on a voyage from Riga to London, She was refloated and anchored off Corton, Suffolk in a waterlogged condition before being taken in to Great Yarmouth.
Marie Celestine	France	The schooner was driven ashore at Wells-next-the-Sea, Norfolk, United Kingdom. Her crew were rescued. She was on a voyage from La Nouvelle to Goole, Yorkshire.
Mary	United Kingdom	The brig was reported to have been abandoned in the North Sea. She was subsequently driven ashore and wrecked near Gravelines, Nord, France with the loss of three of her six crew. Survivors were rescued by the Gravelines Lifeboat. She was on a voyage from Seaham, County Durham to Dunkirk, Nord.
Mercurius	Norway	The brig sprang a leak and was abandoned in the North Sea. Her crew were rescued by the barque Antoinette (France). Mercurius was on a voyage from Kragerø to Harlingen, Friesland, Netherlands.
Napier	Canada	The ship was driven ashore and wrecked in Cow Bay. She was refloated in June 1870 and taken in to North Sydney, Nova Scotia.
Palmyra	United Kingdom	The brig was abandoned 80 nautical miles (150 km) west by south of "Holman". Her crew were rescued by the steamship Joseph Somes (United Kingdom). Palmyra was on a voyage from Kronstadt, Russia to West Hartlepool, County Durham. She drove ashore at Ringkøbing, Denmark on 5 November.
Regalia	United Kingdom	The brig foundered in the North Sea off Heligoland. Her eight crew were rescued by a Dutch pilot cutter. She was on a voyage from Middlesbrough, Yorkshire to Hamburg.
Rhone	United Kingdom	The steamship was driven ashore at Europa Point, Gibraltar. She was on a voyage from Liverpool, Lancashire to Genoa, Italy She had been refloated by 1 November with assistance from HMS Redpole (Royal Navy).
Statina	Belgium	The ship was driven ashore and wrecked near Westkapelle, West Flanders.
Stonewall	United States	The steamboat was destroyed by fire at Neely's Landing, Missouri with the loss of 220 of the 258 people on board. She was on a voyage from Saint Louis, Missouri to New Orleans, Louisiana.
Test	United Kingdom	The ship collided with Letitia (United Kingdom) and foundered off the coast of Suffolk with the loss of all hands. She was on a voyage from Southampton, Hampshire to Berwick upon Tweed, Northumberland.
Triton	Canada	The ship was driven ashore and wrecked in Cow Bay.
Truro	Canada	The ship was driven ashore and wrecked in Cow Bay.
Vixen	Canada	The ship was driven ashore and wrecked in Cow Bay/>
Zephyr	United Kingdom	The barque was abandoned off Peterhead, Aberdeenshire. Her crew were rescued by a pilot boat.
Unnamed	United Kingdom	The smack was driven ashore and wrecked near Fraserburgh, Aberdeenshire.
Two unnamed vessels	United Kingdom	The fishing smacks foundered in the North Sea, each with the loss of all six crew.

== 28 October ==
List of shipwrecks: 28 October 1869
Ship	State	Description
Aspern	United Kingdom	The schooner ran aground on the Barrows Sand, in the North Sea off the coast of Essex. Her crew were rescued by a smack. She was refloated with the assistance of two smacks and taken in to Harwich, Essex in a leaky condition.
Ayn	Russia	The barque was driven ashore at Grimsby, Lincolnshire, United Kingdom. She was on a voyage from Vyborg, Grand Duchy of Finland to Hull, Yorkshire, United Kingdom. She was refloated with the assistance of two tugs and towed in to Grimsby.
Cambridge	United Kingdom	The ship was abandoned in the Atlantic Ocean 60 nautical miles (110 km) off Cape Race, Newfoundland Colony. Her crew were rescued by the schooner Dyalytria ( Canada and the barque Post (Norway). The derelict Cambridge was towed in to Sydney, Nova Scotia, Canada on 13 November.
Durley	United Kingdom	The steamship was damaged by an onboard explosion and subsequent fire off Portland, Dorset. Six of her crew were injured. She was on a voyage from Cardiff, Glamorgan to Portland.
Gibraltar	United Kingdom	The steamship ran aground in the River Thames at East Greenwich, Kent. She was on a voyage from Cádiz, Spain, to London. She was refloated and completed her voyage.
Giuseppina	Italy	The brig was driven ashore and wrecked at Cowden, Yorkshire with the loss of three of her ten crew. Survivors were rescued by a fishing boat. She was on a voyage from Naples to Leith, Lothian, United Kingdom.
Hope	United Kingdom	The schooner was driven ashore and wrecked near Liverpool, Lancashire. Her crew were rescued. She was on a voyage from Dundalk, County Louth to Troon, Ayrshire.
Janet Forbes	United Kingdom	The ship was driven ashore at Low Point, Nova Scotia, Canada. She was on a voyage from London to Pictou, Nova Scotia. She was consequently condemned. She was refloated in June 1870 and taken in to North Sydney, Nova Scotia.
King John	United Kingdom	The ship was driven ashore near "Singo". She was on a voyage from Umeå, Sweden to an English port. She was refloated on 1 December and taken in to Stockholm, Sweden.
Makrell	Bremen	The fishing cutter was abandoned off Borkum, Prussia. Her four crew were rescued by the barque Penelope (United Kingdom).
Napoleon	United Kingdom	The ship collided with Highlander (United Kingdom) and was abandoned in the North Sea. Napoleon was on a voyage from Caernarfon to Hull.
Queen Victoria	United Kingdom	The ship was run ashore at Bridlington. She was on a voyage from King's Lynn, Norfolk to Hartlepool, County Durham. She was refloated on 3 November and taken in to Bridlington.
Thomas	United Kingdom	The schooner was driven ashore near Larne, County Antrim. She was on a voyage from Belfast to Larne.
Victor	United Kingdom	The brig ran aground on the Smithy Sand, in the North Sea off the coast of Yorkshire. Her crew got on board the Humber Lightship ( Trinity House), from where they were rescued by Sea Nymph (United Kingdom).
William	United Kingdom	The schooner was driven ashore near Rhyl, Denbighshire.
William Frothingham	United States	The full-rigged ship ran aground in the North Sea off Cromer, Norfolk. She was on a voyage from a Baltic port to South Shields, County Durham, United Kingdom and New York. She was refloated with assistance from the Cromer Lifeboat Benjamin Bond Cabbell ( Royal National Lifeboat Institution) and taken in to Great Yarmouth, Norfolk.

== 29 October ==
List of shipwrecks: 29 October 1869
Ship	State	Description
Arvid	Sweden	The ship was abandoned in the North Sea. Her crew were rescued. She was on a voyage from Hull, Yorkshire, United Kingdom to a Swedish port.
Constitution	Flag unknown	The schooner was driven ashore at Donna Nook, Lincolnshire, United Kingdom.
Eliza	United Kingdom	The ship foundered in the Baltic Sea off the "Bruster Ort". Her crew were rescued by a Prussian vessel. She was on a voyage from Pillau, Prussia to Exeter, Devon.
Emilie	Prussia	The brig was driven ashore on Amager, Denmark. She was on a voyage from Stettin to Sunderland, County Durham, United Kingdom.
Excellent	United Kingdom	The ship was abandoned in the North Sea 5 nautical miles (9.3 km) off Flamborough Head, Yorkshire. She was on a voyage from Newcastle upon Tyne, Northumberland to Teignmouth, Devon.
Fair Maid	United Kingdom	The schooner was driven ashore near Filey, Yorkshire. She was on a voyage from Grangemouth, Stirlingshire to Aberdeen.
Ravensbury	United Kingdom	The steamship ran aground at Brielle, South Holland, Netherlands. She had been refloated by 1 November.
Thilda	Norway	The brig was abandoned in the North Sea. Her crew were rescued by Joseph Hayden (United Kingdom).
Triover	Sweden	The brig was driven ashore at Yarmouth, Isle of Wight, United Kingdom. She was on a voyage from Söderhamn to Poole, Dorset, United Kingdom.
Unnamed	United Kingdom	The ship was driven ashore at Donna Nook.

== 30 October ==
List of shipwrecks: 30 October 1869
Ship	State	Description
Commerce	United Kingdom	The ship was abandoned in the North Sea off Heligoland. Her crew were rescued the steamship by Alexis (Flag unknown). Commerce was on a voyage from Porsgrund, Norway to Liverpool, Lancashire. She was towed in to Cuxhaven.
Elizabeth Reed	United Kingdom	The schooner sank in the North Sea off Orfordness, Suffolk. Her crew survived. She was on a voyage from Charlestown, Cornwall to Bruges, West Flanders, Belgium.
Ellen	United Kingdom	The schooner was driven ashore at Havre de Grâce, Seine-Inférieure, France. Her crew were rescued. She was refloated the next day and towed in to Havre de Grâce.
Emilie	Rostock	The schooner foundered in the North Sea. Her crew were rescued by Hendrika (Netherlands). Emilie was on a voyage from Newcastle upon Tyne, Northumberland, United Kingdom to Lübeck.
Henry Tinnoth	United Kingdom	The ship ran aground at Maassluis, South Holland, Netherlands.
Lightning	United Kingdom	The clipper was scuttled in Corio Bay off Geelong, Victoria, Australia, after a fire aboard her went out of control.
Lotus	United Kingdom	The barque was driven ashore and wrecked near Gävle, Sweden. Her crew were rescued. She was on a voyage from Kronstadt, Russia to Gävle.
Tern, and William Connal	United Kingdom	The steamshipTern collided with the steamship William Connal in the Clyde at Greenock, Renfrewshire and was consequently beached at Bowling, Dunbartonshire. She was on a voyage from Antwerp, Belgium to Glasgow, Renfrewshire. William Connal sank. Her crew survived. She was on a voyage from Glasgow to Havre de Grâce, Seine-Inférieure, France. She was refloated on 21 January 1870 and beached.
Zebiah	Italy	The ship was driven ashore near Messina, Sicily. She was on a voyage from Naples to Taranto. She was refloated.

== 31 October ==
List of shipwrecks: 31 October 1869
Ship	State	Description
Florence Lee	United Kingdom	The ship, which had sprung a leak on 18 October, foundered in the Atlantic Ocean. Her crew were rescued by Hannah Morris (United States). Florence Lee was on a voyage from Montreal, Quebec, Canada to Liverpool, Lancashire.
Lightning	United States	The extreme clipper caught fire at Geelong, Victoria and was scuttled. She was subsequently destroyed as she was an obstruction to navigation.
Sweden	Sweden	The barque was taken in to Sheerness, Kent, United Kingdom in a waterlogged condition. She was on a voyage from Sundsvall to Grimsby, Lincolnshire, United Kingdom.
Pilgrim	United Kingdom	The ship was abandoned in the Atlantic Ocean. Her crew were rescued by Solertia (Norway) and Tippoo Saib (United Kingdom).

== Unknown date ==
List of shipwrecks: Unknown date in October 1869
Ship	State	Description
Ada or Adam	United Kingdom	The steamship was lost on the Dutch coast before 22 October. Her crew were rescued by British fishing boats.
Æolus	United Kingdom	The barque was abandoned in the North Sea 100 nautical miles (190 km) off Spurn Point, Yorkshire with the loss of two of her crew. She was on a voyage from Sundsvall, Sweden to West Hartlepool, County Durham. She was towed in to Rotterdam, South Holland, Netherlands in a waterlogged condition on 30 October by William Coulman (United Kingdom).
Amanda	United Kingdom	The smack foundered in the North Sea with the loss of all hands.
Ansonia	Italy	The ship was wrecked near Brindisi. he was on a voyage from Newcastle upon Tyne, Northumberland, United Kingdom to Venice.
Appolonia	United Kingdom	The ship was driven ashore at Bergkvara, Sweden. She was on a voyage from Piteå, Sweden to London. She was refloated on 30 October and taken in to Kalmar, Sweden for repairs.
Ariel	Netherlands	The ship was driven ashore on Öland. She was reported to be on a voyage from Lisbon, Portugal to Schiedam, South Holland, Netherlands. She was refloated and taken in to Kalmar, Sweden.
Aurora	United Kingdom	The smack foundered in the North Sea with the loss of all hands.
Beloochee	United Kingdom	The steamship was wrecked at Cape Ray, Newfoundland Colony. Her crew were rescued by the schooner Appoline ( Canada). Beloochee was on a voyage from Belfast, County Antrim to Quebec City, Canada.
Bonnie Lass	United Kingdom	The smack foundered in the North Sea with the loss of all hands.
Calabar	United Kingdom	The steamship ran aground in the Sherbro River before 23 October. She was on a voyage from Liverpool to the Sherbor River. She was refloated a week later with assistance from RMS Macgregor Laird (United Kingdom).
Catherina Margaretha	Netherlands	The ship was wrecked on the north coast of Prince Edward Island, Canada after 23 October. She was on a voyage from Richibucto, New Brunswick, Canada to Hull, Yorkshire, United Kingdom.
Charlotte	United Kingdom	The ship was driven ashore at "Berguara", or on Öland. She was on a voyage from Leith, Lothian to Saint Petersburg, Russia.
Chieftain	United Kingdom	The barque was driven ashore on Skagen, Denmark. Her crew were rescued. She was on a voyage from Newcastle upon Tyne to Uddevalla, Sweden. She was refloated on 12 October and towed in to Uddevalla.
Dreadnought	United States	The ship was lost off "Point Penas", California. She was on a voyage from Liverpool, Lancashire to San Francisco, California.
Emily	United Kingdom	The barque foundered with the loss of all eleven people on board. She was on a voyage from South Shields, County Durham to Hamburg.
Emmery	United Kingdom	The ship was wrecked at "Altaba".
Etha Rickmers	Bremen	The ship was wrecked on the Goodwin Sands, Kent, United Kingdom with the loss of all 23 crew.
Eugene	United Kingdom	The fishing smack foundered with in the North Sea the loss of all hands.
Fanny	United States	The fishing schooner collided with a British ship and foundered in the Gulf of Saint Lawrence with the loss of two of her crew.
Fear Not	United Kingdom	The schooner capsized in the North Sea off the Farne Islands, Northumberland on or before 12 October.
Forfarshire	United Kingdom	The ship was damaged by fire at Calcutta, India before 20 October.
Garland	United Kingdom	The fishing smack foundered in the North Sea with the loss of all hands.
Hecla	United Kingdom	The ship was wrecked on Inagua, Bahamas. She was on a voyage from Saint Domingo to Falmouth, Cornwall.
John Wesley	United Kingdom	The fishing smack was reported missing in the North Sea with eleven crew on board.
Juno	United Kingdom	The schooner was abandoned in the North Sea.
Kingdom of Belgium	United States	The ship was driven ashore in Delaware Bay. She was on a voyage from Singapore, Straits Settlements to New York. She was later refloated and completed her voyage.
Lancashire	United Kingdom	The ship was wrecked at Pernambuco, Brazil before 13 October.
Leal	United Kingdom	The steamship foundered in the North Sea 65 nautical miles (120 km) north of the mouth of the Humber between 11 and 17 October with the loss of all eighteen people on board. She was on a voyage from Helsinki, Grand Duchy of Finland to Hull.
Liva	United Kingdom	The schooner foundered in the North Sea off the Dutch coast.
Lizzie	United Kingdom	The fishing smack collided with another vessel and foundered in the Dogger Bank before 23 October with the loss of all hands.
Lord Raglan	United Kingdom	The smack foundered in the North Sea with the loss of all hands.
Lucetta	United Kingdom	The barque was abandoned in the Atlantic Ocean (48°20′N 18°14′W) before 14 October. Her crew were rescued by Aurora ( Canada. Lucetta was on a voyage from Liverpool to Montreal, Quebec, Canada.
Margaret	United Kingdom	The ship was wrecked near Ballyshannon, County Donegal with the loss of two of her crew. She was on a voyage from Ballyshannon to a port in North America.
Marguerite	France	The ship was taken into Bermuda in a derelict condition.
Mary O'Brien	United States	The barque caught fire in the Atlantic Ocean and was abandoned by her crew, who were rescued by George Annie (United Kingdom). Mary O'Brien was on a voyage from South Shields to Callao, Peru.
Mary Stamford	United Kingdom	The barque was abandoned in the Atlantic Ocean.
Mirella	United Kingdom	The ship was destroyed by fire in the Guañape Islands, Peru.
Nellie Chapin	United States	The brig was abandoned in the Atlantic Ocean. Her crew were rescued by the barque Prinz Albert (Flag unknown). Nellie Chapin was on a voyage from Newport, Monmouthshire, United Kingdom to Genoa, Italy.
Nor'Wester	United States	The fishing schooner sailed from New York City for Para and vanished. Lost with all 5 hands.
Parejero	Argentina	The ship struck a reef in the Gaspar Strait. She was on a voyage from Whampoa Dock, China to Buenos Aires. She put in to Singapore.
Peruvian	United States	The ship was wrecked on "Vries Island", near Yokohama, Japan.
Pia	Austria-Hungary	The ship foundered in the North Sea after 12 October. She was on a voyage from Falmouth to Stockton-on-Tees, County Durham.
Princess Royal	Sweden	The brig collided with a barque in the North Sea and was abandoned by her crew before 4 October. Her crew were rescued by a Norwegian brig. She was taken in to Middlesbrough, Yorkshire, United Kingdom on 9 October by John and Alice Brown (United Kingdom).
Prodomoe	France	The ship sank at Kerch, Russia.
Prosperity	United Kingdom	The fishing vessel foundered in the North Sea with the loss of all eleven crew.
Pursuit	United Kingdom	The fishing smack foundered in the North Sea with the loss of all hands.
Rambler	United Kingdom	The fishing vessel foundered in the North Sea with the loss of all ten crew.
Robert Lowe	United Kingdom	The steamship ran aground at the mouth of the Mississippi River before 18 October. She was on a voyage from Liverpool to New Orleans, Louisiana.
Royal Diadem	United Kingdom	The smack foundered in the North Sea with the loss of all hands.
Seura	United Kingdom	The ship was driven ashore and severely damaged on Heligoland. She was on a voyage from Newcastle upon Tyne to Pori, Grand Duchy of Finland.
Sylph	United Kingdom	The ship was driven ashore near "Hourdel".
Syringa	United Kingdom	The ship was driven ashore on Bangka Island, Netherlands East Indies.
Sytendi Mai	Flag unknown	The brig was driven ashore and wrecked at Wijk aan Zee, North Holland, Netherlands. She was on a voyage from Tvedestrand, Norway to an English port.
Therese	United Kingdom	The ship was lost on the Dutch coast. She was on a voyage from Liverpool to Pillau, Prussia.
Thilda	Norway	The brig foundered in the North Sea before 29 October. Her crew were rescued by Joseph Haydn (United Kingdom).
Thomas Rusbridger	United Kingdom	The ship departed from East Wemyss, Fife for Boulogne, Pas-de-Calais, France. No further trace, presumed foundered with the loss of all hands.
Victoria	Sweden	The schooner was abandoned in the Dogger Bank before 20 October. She was on a voyage from Gävle to Boston, Lincolnshire, United Kingdom.
Vincentius von Paolo	Uruguay	The ship ran aground on the French Reef. She was on a voyage from Pensacola, Florida, United States to Montevideo.
Zoe	United Kingdom	The steamship was wrecked in Cow Bay, Nova Scotia after 18 October. Her crew survived. She was on a voyage from Savannah, Georgia, United States to Liverpool. She was refloated in August 1870 and taken in to Sydney, Nova Scotia.
