= Kwangtung (boat) =

Chinese dispatch boat

Lay-Osborn Flotilla
- Name: Kwangtung (廣東); Pai Yueh (百粵)
- Namesake: Guangdong; Baiyue
- Builder: Laird Brothers Limited
- Yard number: 297
- Launched: 4 March 1863
- Out of service: 1863
- Fate: Sold

General characteristics
- Class & type: Dispatch boat
- Displacement: 552 long tons (561 t)
- Tons burthen: 552 bm
- Length: 185 ft 0 in (56.38 m)
- Beam: 24 ft 0 in (7.31 m)
- Draught: 12 ft 10 in (3.9 m)
- Installed power: 150 nhp; 560 hp (420 kW)
- Propulsion: Side-wheel

Kwangtung (Chinese: 廣東; pinyin: Guǎngdōng; lit. 'Guangdong') was a British-made dispatch boat launched in 1863.

== History ==
Kwangtung was purchased by Horatio Nelson Lay, Inspector General of the Qing Dynasty Chinese Maritime Customs Service in May 1863 as part of an effort to bolster the Qing Dynasty naval force in response to the ongoing Taiping Rebellion. Thereafter she became part of the Lay-Osborn Flotilla commanded by Sherard Osborn. She was put under the command of Lieut. William Allen Young. Upon her arrival in China, the Qing government ordered the ship to be renamed as Pai Yueh (Chinese: 百粵; pinyin: Bǎiyuè; lit. 'Baiyue').

Disagreements between the Qing government and Lay over the command and composition of the Lay-Osborn Flotilla led to its disbandment in 1863, and Kwangtung was taken to Bombay. There, along with Thule, Kwangtung was sold to the Indian government for a total of £8,142.
