= HMS Mohawk (1856) =

British Vigilant-class gunvessel

History

United Kingdom
- Name: Mohawk
- Builder: Young, Magnay and Co.
- Launched: 11 January 1856
- Fate: Sold, 20 September 1862

Lay-Osborn Flotilla
- Name: Pei King (北京); Chin T'ai (金台)
- Namesake: Peking
- Acquired: 20 September 1862
- Decommissioned: 1863
- Fate: Sold, 30 December 1865

General characteristics
- Class & type: Vigilant-class gunvessel
- Displacement: 860 long tons (874 t)
- Tons burthen: 670 bm
- Length: 180 ft 0 in (54.86 m)
- Beam: 28 ft 0 in (8.53 m)
- Draught: 14 ft 0 in (4.26 m)
- Installed power: 200 nhp; 624 hp (465 kW)
- Propulsion: Steam engine; Single screw
- Speed: 11 knots (20 km/h; 13 mph)
- Armament: 1 × 7-inch/110-pdr breech loader; 1 × 68-pdr muzzle-loading rifle; 2 × 20-pdr breech loaders

HMS Mohawk was a British Vigilant-class gunvessel launched in 1856.

== History ==
HMS Mohawk was purchased by Horatio Nelson Lay, Inspector General of the Qing Dynasty Chinese Maritime Customs Service, on 20 September 1862, as part of an effort to bolster the Qing Dynasty naval force in response to the ongoing Taiping Rebellion. Thereafter she was renamed Pei King (also as Pekin, Chinese: 北京; pinyin: Běijīng; lit. 'Beijing'), and became part of the Lay-Osborn Flotilla commanded by Sherard Osborn. She was put under the command of Hugh Burgoyne. Upon her arrival in China, the Qing government ordered the ship to be renamed as Chin T'ai (Chinese: 金台; pinyin: Jīntái).

Disagreements between the Qing government and Lay over the command of the Lay-Osborn Flotilla led to its disbandment in 1863, and Pekin returned to the United Kingdom. She was originally intended for sale, but an embargo on sales, due to the concurrent American Civil War and fear of the vessel joining the Confederate States Navy, prevented any sales. When the American Civil War ended in 1865, she, along with China and Tientsin, were sold in an auction to Egypt on 30 December 1865 for £20,500.
