= Admiral Osborn =

Admiral Osborn may refer to:

- Henry Osborn (Royal Navy officer) (1694–1771), British Royal Navy admiral
- Peregrine Osborne, 2nd Duke of Leeds (1659–1729), British Royal Navy vice admiral
- Sherard Osborn (1822–1875), British Royal Navy rear admiral
