= Rosario-class sloop =

1862 class of British sloops-of-war

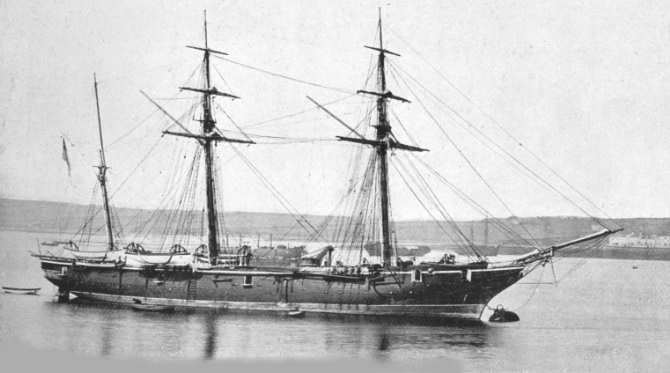
- Rosario-class sloop Peterel

Class overview
- Name: Rosario-class sloop
- Builders: Pembroke Dockyard; Devonport Dockyard; Deptford Dockyard
- Operators: Royal Navy; (Qing dynasty) Chinese Imperial Customs; (Ottoman Empire) Egyptian Government
- Built: 1860 - 1862
- In commission: 1862 - 1881
- Completed: 7
- Canceled: 6
- Lost: 0

General characteristics
- Displacement: 913 tons
- Length: 160 ft 10 in (49.02 m)
- Beam: 30 ft 6 in (9.30 m)
- Draught: 15 ft 10 in (4.83 m)
- Installed power: 436 - 627 indicated horsepower
- Propulsion: Single screw; 2-cylinder horizontal single-expansion steam engine
- Sail plan: As built: Ship-rigged; From c.1869: Barque-rigged
- Speed: About 9 kn (17 km/h) under power
- Complement: 140
- Armament: As built: 11 guns: 1 × 40-pounder (120 mm) Armstrong breech loading guns; 6 × 32-pounder (160 mm) muzzle-loading smooth-bore guns; 4 × 20-pounder (95 mm) Armstrong breech loading guns; By 1869: 3 guns; 1 × 7-inch (178 mm) 6.5-ton muzzle-loading gun; 2 × 40-pounder (120 mm) Armstrong breech loading guns

The Rosario class was a class of seven screw-sloops of wooden construction built for the Royal Navy between 1860 and 1862. A further six vessels were ordered and laid down, but were cancelled in 1863 before launch. This was the last class of purely wooden sloops built for the Royal Navy.

== Design ==
The Rosario class were designed in 1858 by Issac Watts, the Director of Naval Construction. They were built of wood, were rated for 11 guns and were built with a full ship rig of sails (this was reduced to a barque rig by about 1869). With a length overall of 160 feet (49 m) and a beam of 30 feet 4 inches (9.25 m), they had a displacement of 913 tons. These were the last sloops constructed for the Royal Navy to retain all-wooden construction; their successors, the Amazon class, incorporated iron cross beams.

=== Propulsion ===
All the completed vessels, with the exception of Shearwater, were fitted with a Greenock Foundry Company two-cylinder horizontal single-expansion steam engine driving a single screw. With an indicated horsepower of between 436 horsepower (325 kW) and 627 horsepower (468 kW) they were capable of about 9 knots (17 km/h) under steam. Shearwater's R & W Hawthorn engine was similar in design and power.

=== Armament ===
As designed, ships of the class carried a single slide-mounted 40-pounder Armstrong breech-loading gun, six 32-pounder muzzle-loading smooth-bore guns and four pivot-mounted 20-pounder Armstrong breech loaders. By 1869 the armament had been reduced to a single 7-inch (180 mm) muzzle-loading gun and two 40-pounders.

== Operational lives ==
=== Rosario ===
Rosario served a four-year commission on the North America and West Indies Station and then served an eight-year commission in Australia. She paid off in Sheerness in 1875 and was broken up nearly ten years later.

=== Peterel ===
Peterel served three commissions as a warship, on the North America and West Indies Station, the Cape of Good Hope Station and the Pacific Station. In 1877 she became a lightship marking the wreck of Vanguard, then in 1885 she was converted into a coal depot before finally being sold in 1901, the longest lived of her class.

=== Rapid ===
Rapid served a commission on the Cape of Good Hope Station and then two commissions with the Mediterranean Fleet before being broken up at Malta after more than 20 years service.

=== Shearwater ===
Shearwater spent a single six-year commission on the Pacific Station and was then converted into a survey vessel. Under George Strong Nares and later William Wharton (later Hydrographer of the Navy) she surveyed around the Mediterranean and the East coast of Africa. She was broken up at Sheerness in 1877.

=== Royalist ===
Royalist served both her commissions on the North America and West Indies Station, being commanded between 1865 and 1866 by Maurice Horatio Nelson, son of Thomas Nelson, 2nd Earl Nelson and great nephew to Horatio Nelson. She was broken up at Chatham in 1875.

=== Columbine ===
Columbine served briefly in the Channel Squadron before moving to the Pacific Station. Her second commission was on the East Indies Station, which at the time was involved in a long campaign to combat slavery in the area. Like Royalist, she was broken up at Chatham in 1875.

=== Africa ===
Of all the class, Africa had by far the shortest career in the Royal Navy, but one of the most unusual. Sold to the Imperial Chinese Customs shortly after launch, and renamed China, she became part of Sherard Osborn's "Vampire Fleet", along with Jasper and Mohawk. The venture came to nothing when it became apparent that command would not rest with the Emperor, but instead with local Mandarins. Osborn resigned his command, and the ships were resold to the Egyptian government in the mid-1860s.

== Ships ==
Name	Ship Builder	Launched	Fate
Rosario	Deptford Dockyard	17 October 1860	Prison ship for young criminals in South Australia from 1874, sold for breaking 31 January 1884
Peterel	Devonport Dockyard	10 November 1860	Light vessel from 1877, coal hulk from 1885, sold October 1901
Rapid	Deptford Dockyard	29 November 1860	Broken up at Malta in September 1881
Shearwater	Pembroke Dockyard	17 October 1861	Broken up at Sheerness in 1877
Royalist	Devonport Dockyard	14 December 1861	Broken up at Chatham in 1875
Columbine	Deptford Dockyard	2 April 1862	Broken up at Chatham in 1875
Africa	Devonport Dockyard	14 February 1862	Sold to Chinese Imperial Customs 18 August 1862, renamed China and sailed to join Sherard Osborn's "Vampire Fleet". Resold to the Egyptian Government 30 December 1865.
Circassian (ex-Enterprise)	Deptford Dockyard	-	Cancelled 12 December 1863
Acheron	Deptford Dockyard	-	Cancelled 12 December 1863
Bittern	Devonport Dockyard	-	Cancelled 12 December 1863
Fame	Deptford Dockyard	-	Cancelled 12 December 1863
Cynthia	Devonport Dockyard	-	Cancelled 12 December 1863
Sabrina	Pembroke Dockyard	-	Cancelled 12 December 1863
