= HMS Rapid (1860) =

Sloop of the Royal Navy

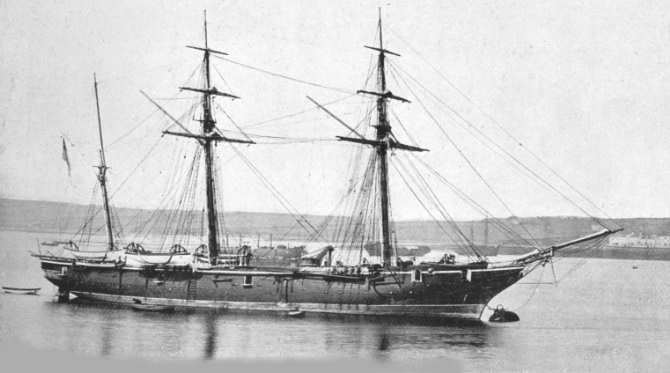
- Sister-ship, HMS Peterel

History

United Kingdom
- Name: HMS Rapid
- Ordered: 27 March 1858
- Builder: Deptford Dockyard
- Laid down: 18 August 1859
- Launched: 29 November 1860
- Commissioned: June 1862
- Fate: Broken up at Malta in September 1881

General characteristics
- Class & type: Rosario-class sloop
- Displacement: 913 tons
- Length: 160 ft 10 in (49.02 m)
- Beam: 30 ft 6 in (9.30 m)
- Draught: 15 ft 10 in (4.83 m)
- Installed power: 460 indicated horsepower
- Propulsion: 2-cylinder horizontal single-expansion steam engine; Single screw
- Sail plan: As built: Ship-rigged; From c.1869: Barge-rigged
- Speed: 9.1 kn (16.9 km/h) under power
- Complement: 140
- Armament: As built: 11 guns: One 40-pdr Armstrong breech loaders; Six 32-pdr muzzle-loading smooth-bore guns; Four 20-pdr Armstrong breech loaders; By 1869: 3 guns; One 7-inch 7.5-ton muzzle-loading gun; Two 40-pdr Armstrong breech loaders

HMS Rapid was an 11-gun Rosario-class wooden-hulled screw-driven sloop of the Royal Navy, launched on 29 November 1860 at Deptford Dockyard and broken up in 1881.

== Design ==
The Rosario class were designed in 1858 by Issac Watts, the Director of Naval Construction. They were built of wood, were rated for 11 guns and were built with a full ship rig of sails. With a length overall of 160 feet (49 m) and a beam of 30 feet 4 inches (9.25 m), they had a displacement of 913 tons.

=== Propulsion ===
Rapid was fitted with a Greenock Foundry Company two-cylinder horizontal single-expansion steam engine driving a single screw. With an indicated horsepower of 460 horsepower (340 kW) she was capable of 9.1 knots (16.9 km/h) under steam.

=== Armament ===
As designed ships of the class carried a single slide-mounted 40-pounder Armstrong breech-loading gun, six 32-pounder muzzle-loading smooth-bore guns and four pivot-mounted 20-pounder Armstrong breech loaders. By 1869 the armament had been reduced to a single 7-inch (180 mm) muzzle-loading gun and two 40-pounders.

== Service history ==
=== First Commission - Cape of Good Hope ===
Rapid was commissioned under Commander Charles Jago at Woolwich on 12 June 1862. Commander Jago took the ship to the Cape of Good Hope Station where she remained until 1866, paying off at Woolwich on 24 January 1867.

=== Second Commission - Mediterranean ===
She was recommissioned at Woolwich on 14 May 1868 by Commander Francis Wood and served in the Mediterranean. While in the Mediterranean she had been converted from fully ship-rigged to barque-rigged. Her guns were reduced from eleven to three; one 7.5-ton muzzle loader and two 40-pounder Armstrong breech loaders. On 5 April 1869, she ran aground entering Malta but was not damaged. In September 1869, she assisted in the refloating of the British steamship Becton, which had run aground at Missolonghi, Greece. On 11 October, she was driven ashore. Repairs cost £347.

=== Third Commission - Mediterranean ===
She recommissioned at Malta on 9 August 1871 under Commander Victor Montagu. In September 1875 her next captain, Commander Seymour Smith, was invalided home, being replaced by Commander Adolphus Fitzgeorge. In 1878 she was attached to the Mediterranean fleet under Geoffrey Hornby. Commander Charles Penrose-Fitzgerald took command on 4 January 1878 when she was stationed at Corfu. The island had recently been transferred from British to Greek control, which had resulted in a decline in the local economy as British forces and their funding had been withdrawn. Her Armstrong guns had a reputation amongst their crews as 'two muzzle guns, what shoots inwards', due to the unreliability of the breech mechanism. It was felt they killed more of their operators than ever those fired upon. The 7.5-ton gun was intended to fire to either side of the ship, but the spare topmast was stored on the port side of the ship, preventing the gun being fired in that direction. This difficulty was corrected by Fitzgerald once he assumed command.

At the request of the British consul, Rapid evacuated 180 Christian women and children from Tre Scogli and Santi Quaranta villages in Albania when an attack by Turkish troops was expected. Fitzgerald was first censured for exceeding his authority in doing this by Admiral Hornby, but the Admiralty confirmed he had acted under instructions. The villagers for the most part remained destitute in Corfu for many years.

In the autumn of 1878 Rapid was ordered to Malta for her annual refit. She was then ordered to visit Syria for the winter. The summer of 1879 was spent again at Malta refitting the ship and exchanging the crew. Fitzgerald found this trying, as his good companions with whom he had enjoyed hunting wherever the ship visited, were departing. Rapid was ordered to Constantinople for the winter, to act as guard ship for the ambassador. Each of the Great Powers kept a small warship there in attendance.

== Fate ==
Rapid was paid off at Malta on 14 January 1881 and was broken up there in September of the same year.
