= Charles Cooper Penrose-Fitzgerald =

Royal Navy Vice-Admiral (1841–1921)

Admiral Charles Cooper Penrose-Fitzgerald
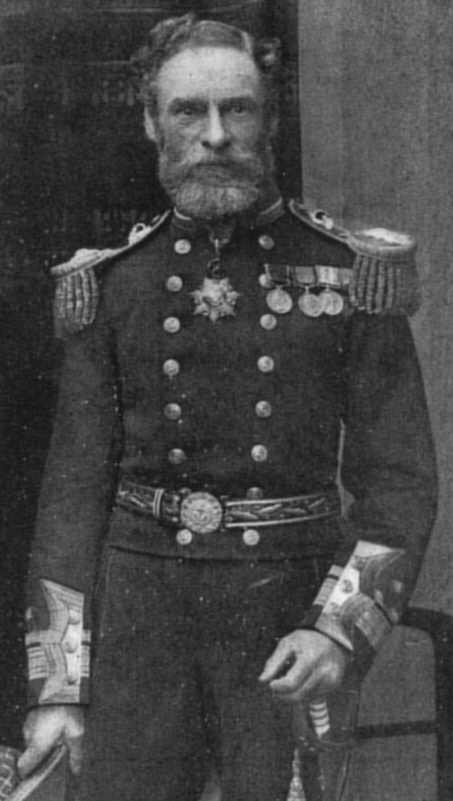
- Born: 30 April 1841; Corkbeg, Ireland
- Died: 11 August 1921 (aged 80); 2 Trinity Road, Folkestone, Kent
- Military career
- Allegiance: Royal Navy
- Service years: 1854–1901
- Rank: Admiral
- Nickname: Rough
- Other work: author

Admiral Charles Cooper Penrose-Fitzgerald (30 April 1841 – 11 August 1921) was a senior officer in the Royal Navy.

== Family ==
His father was Robert Uniacke Penrose (1800–1857) who married Francis Matilda Austin, daughter of the Revd Robert Austin, prebendary of Cloyne Cathedral. Charles married Henrietta Elizabeth Hewson on 29 November 1882, daughter of Revd Francis Hewson of Dunganston, Wicklow. They had a son John Uniacke Penrose Fitzgerald (27 July 1888 – 11 December 1940) who also joined the navy and was killed on active service in World War II. In 1896 Charles changed his own surname to Uniacke-Penrose-Fitzgerald.

== Career ==
He was educated at Dr. Burney's academy, Gosport, and joined the navy in 1854 on board HMS Victory at Portsmouth. In 1855 he served in the Baltic and then the Black Sea in 1856. He served on HMS Retribution on the China station and in 1860 on HMS Ariadne.

On 22 May 1861 he was made lieutenant. On 24 July 1871 he became a commander while serving as first lieutenant on HMS Hercules under Captain Lord Gilford. He was appointed to second in command of HMS Agincourt, flagship of the second division of the Mediterranean squadron, commander Captain Hopkins. Hercules had been involved in the rescue of Agincourt when her previous commander had allowed her to run aground near Gibraltar. He spent three years on HMS Asia, which was an old hulk moored near Fareham. Lord Gilford was once again in command. The posting was a bad one for an officer concerned about his career, but allowed plenty of leave and hunting. The most onerous duty was that he was sometimes called to sit on courts-martial. In the summer he had a small yacht to sail about in the Solent so as not to get out of practice. After Asia he spent a period on half pay and while in Ireland had a bad hunting accident which required him to lie flat for most of a year while recovering.

On 4 January 1878 he was appointed to his first independent command in HMS Rapid in the Mediterranean. Lord Gilford was now a junior Lord of the Admiralty so was able to assist in obtaining the command. Rapid was the slowest ship in the fleet, so was normally used for 'detached' duties. It was fourteen months before Fitzgerald met the squadron commander, Admiral Geoffrey Hornby.

On 19 March 1880 he was promoted to captain and was appointed to HMS Inconstant, flagship of the flying squadron. Although he wrote on the subject of sailing, he was an advocate of the complete removal of sails from naval vessels (which frequently were equipped with both engines and sails at this time).

In 1884 he was the captain of the Royal Naval college, Greenwich. In 1886, he commanded HMS Bellerophon. He was one of the public supporters of a campaign for increased Naval funding (alongside Captain Lord Charles Beresford and Admiral Sir Geoffrey Hornby) which led to the Naval Defence Act 1889 and he continued to be involved in public debate on naval matters throughout his life.

On 7 November 1889 he was made captain of HMS Collingwood in the Mediterranean. He was a proponent of Rear Admiral George Tryon's ideas that a simplified system of flag signals was needed for battle conditions. After Tryon's death, he distributed a pamphlet seeking to continue the campaign for their adoption. Tryon drowned when his flagship HMS Victoria was sunk by a collision with HMS Camperdown during fleet manoeuvres, which caused both public and naval opinion to turn against him and his ideas. Tryon was held responsible for the sinking and his flag system also blamed. Fitzgerald wrote a biography describing Tryon's achievements during his career, but these efforts rebounded to the detriment of his own career.

He continued his writing career by contributing a biography of Admiral Rooke for From Howard to Nelson: Twelve sailors (1899) edited by John Laughton for Greenwich College. He became a naval aide de campe in 1892 and served on the council of the Naval Records Society. In January 1893 he became superintendent of Pembroke naval dockyard. He became a rear admiral on 20 February 1895 and from 1897 to 1899 was second-in-command of the China station. He was promoted to the rank of vice-admiral on 28 March 1901. Promoted to full admiral in 1905, he retired later the same year.

== War with Germany and the white feather campaign ==
Cartoon from German magazine Ulk Michel: "Blut ist dicker als wasser – ist nicht dicker – ist dicker – ist nicht – ist". Admiral Fitzgerald: "Das wollen wir mal sehen"

In 1905 he was requested to write an article for the Deutsche Revue on British naval policy. He had no control over the German translation of his article and said it had exaggerated his statements, but the article expressed a British interpretation of the threat implied by German naval expansion to traditional British command of the seas. It included the observation that Britain would be better served by a war sooner rather than later when the German navy would be bigger. The article was used in Germany to whip up support for the naval programme.

In 1914 Penrose-Fitzgerald organised a group of thirty women in Folkestone to persecute men not in uniform by distributing white feathers. This was reported in the press and rapidly spread nationwide. The government responded by issuing a badge which could be worn by civilians occupied in war work.

A story by Sir Arthur Conan Doyle entitled "Danger! Being the log of Captain John Sirius" appeared in the July 1914 issue of The Strand Magazine. It envisaged Britain's being starved into submission by eight enemy submarines. The underwater menace came from the fictional country of Norland but was a thinly veiled reference to Germany's naval power. The Strand subsequently published an accompanying piece with a response by naval experts. There was scepticism of the prediction of unrestricted submarine warfare. Penrose-Fitzgerald wrote: "I do not myself think that any civilized nation will torpedo unarmed and defenceless merchant ships."

== Published works ==
- Life of Vice-Admiral Sir George Tryon K.C.B., William Blackwood and sons, Edinburgh and London, 1897
- Boat sailing and racing: Containing practical instructions for bending and setting sails, trimming, steering, and handling boats under all circumstances... hints on racing, with a view to winning. Griffin and Co. The Hard, portsmouth 1883 (available online at internet archive )
- Memories of the Sea, Edward Arnold, London 1913 (autobiography part 1, available at internet archive )
- From Sail to steam, naval recollections 1878–1905. 1916 (autobiography, part 2)

=== References ===
- Online service record
- Oxford Dictionary of national biography
- The Dreadnought Project: Charles Cooper Penrose-Fitzgerald
