= HMS Peterel (1860) =

Sloop of the Royal Navy

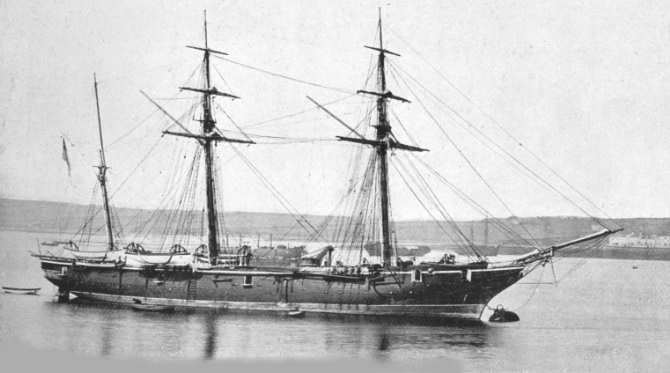
- Rosario-class sloop Peterel

History

United Kingdom
- Name: HMS Peterel
- Ordered: 1 April 1857
- Builder: Devonport Dockyard
- Laid down: 5 December 1859
- Launched: 10 November 1860
- Completed: March 1862
- Reclassified: Lightship in December 1877; Coal hulk in December 1885
- Fate: Sold in October 1901

General characteristics
- Class & type: Rosario-class sloop
- Displacement: 913 tons
- Tons burthen: 668 76/94 bm
- Length: 160 ft (49 m) (gundeck); 139 ft 8.5 in (42.583 m) (keel)
- Beam: 30 ft 4 in (9.25 m)
- Draught: 15 ft 10 in (4.83 m)
- Depth of hold: 18 ft 11 in (5.77 m)
- Propulsion: Sails; 2-cylinder horizontal single expansion engine; Single screw; 150 nhp; 478 ihp
- Sail plan: Full-rigged ship (as built); Barque-rigged (after 1869)
- Speed: 8.982 knots (16.635 km/h; 10.336 mph) (under engines)
- Complement: 130–150
- Armament: As built; 1 × 40-pdr Armstrong BL; 6 × 32-pdr MLSB; 4 × 20-pdr Armstrong BL; After 1869; 1 × 7 in ML; 2 × 40-pdrs

HMS Peterel was a Rosario-class sloop of the Royal Navy.

Peterel served three commissions as a warship, on the North America and West Indies Station, the Cape of Good Hope Station and the Pacific Station. In 1877 she became a lightship marking the wreck of HMS Vanguard, then in 1885 she was converted into a coal depot before finally being sold in 1901, the longest lived of her class.

== Figurehead ==
The ships figurehead was a simple three-quarter-length female bust carved by the resident carver of Devonport Dockyard, Frederick Dickerson of the Dickerson family.

When the ship was sold, the figurehead was preserved at Devonport Dockyard and subsequently moved to the training establishment of HMS Royal Arthur.

The figurehead eventually transferred to the Portsmouth Royal Dockyard Historical Trust who still own the artefact. It is currently at the National Museum of the Royal Navy, Portsmouth as part of 'The Dockyard Apprentice' exhibition.
