= Horatio Nelson Lay =

British diplomat (1832–1898)

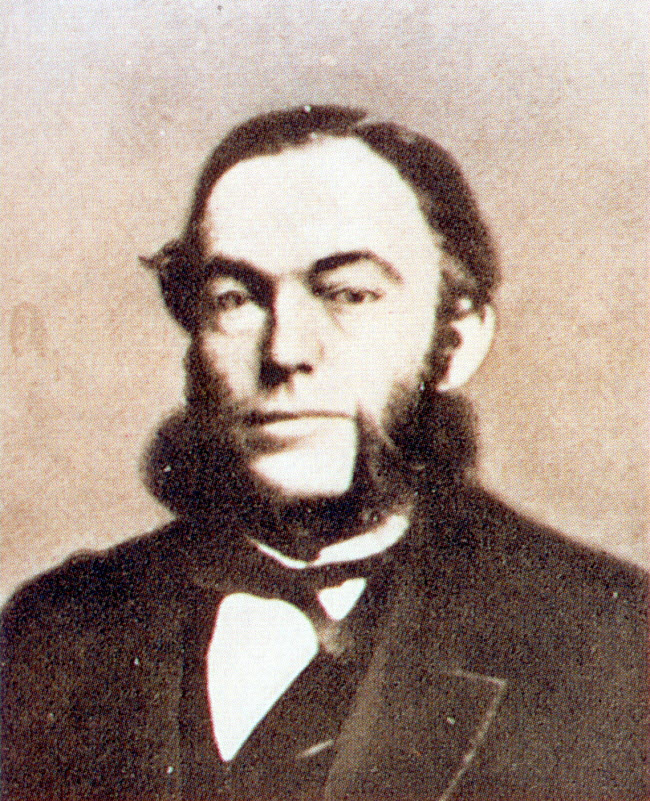
- Born: January 23, 1832; Forest Hill, Kent, England
- Died: May 4, 1898 (aged 66); Forest Hill, Kent, England
- Occupation: diplomat

Horatio Nelson Lay (23 January 1832 – 4 May 1898, Forest Hill, Kent, England) was a British diplomat, noted for his role in the ill-fated "Lay-Osborn Flotilla" during the Taiping Rebellion.

== Biography ==
=== Early life ===
Horatio Nelson Lay was born in Forest Hill to George Tradescant Lay, a naturalist and missionary, who served as British consul in the treaty port of Amoy in China. Lay's father inspired him to go to China, but he died in 1845 before Lay had a chance to join him.

In 1847, Lay was sent to China to study Chinese under the German linguist and missionary Karl Gützlaff. Lay's proficiency in the Chinese language soon earned him promotion in the British consular service and in 1854 he was appointed acting Vice-Consul in Shanghai. The same year, Lay took part in the founding of the Imperial Maritime Customs Service and he became the first Inspector General of the service the following year. In China, Lay adopted a Chinese name Li Taiguo (李泰國, Lǐ Tàiguó), which was similar to his father's (李太郭, Lǐ Tàiguō).

During the Second Opium War, Lay served as Lord Elgin's interpreter and he participated in the negotiation of the Sino-British Treaty of Tianjin. Even though Lay was not in charge of designing the actual treaty, he was instrumental in intimidating the Qing delegation into signing it despite the highly unfavorable terms to the Chinese side. Among other things, Lay humiliated the Qing representative Qiying by exposing recently captured documents, which revealed Qiying's hostility to the British. The disgraced Qiying later committed suicide.

=== Lay-Osborn Flotilla ===
During the Taiping Rebellion the Chinese government wished to regain control over Nanjing, which had been captured by the rebel forces in 1853 and declared their capital, but lacked the necessary ships to bring troops down the Yangtze River and to provide fire support. The Chinese government turned to the British for help, who agreed to provide assistance in order to bring stability to their commerce in China.

The Chinese Emperor, exiled to Jehol, agreed to a proposal presented by British ambassador Sir Frederic Bruce in July 1861 to purchase British gunboats. Robert Hart, interpreter of the Imperial Maritime Customs Service is given credit for creating the proposal. Prince Gong, the head of the Zongli Yamen, appointed Lay as Inspector General of the new flotilla. Lay left China for England on 14 March 1862 with written instructions from Prince Gong.

Queen Victoria agreed to the proposal on 2 September 1862 and gave permission to equip the vessels and hire crews. Lay appointed Captain Sherard Osborn as commander of the flotilla.

It was felt that if the flotilla was to fly an internationally recognized ensign this might reduce the risk of capture and imprisonment but the British Admiralty would not sanction such an ensign without China's explicit consent. Although the Tongzhi Emperor had decreed that the Chinese flag would be a yellow triangle with a blue dragon trying to catch a red ball, Prince Kong did not mention this in his written instructions to Lay, and thus Lay himself designed an ensign to be used by the flotilla.

On 13 February 1863 the “Lay-Osborn” flotilla, also known as the Osborn or "Vampire" Fleet, with seven steam cruisers and a supply ship left England, arriving in China in September 1863. Upon reaching China, Osborn refused to take any orders from local Chinese officers, stating that his agreement with Lay stipulated that any Chinese orders must come directly from the Tongzhi Emperor, as transmitted via Lay. The Imperial court refused to ratify this, and Osborn resigned in pique on 9 November 1863, disbanded the flotilla, and sent the ships back to England without them having fired a shot. Lay was fired that same year by the Chinese government and replaced with Sir Robert Hart.

== Subsequent career ==
In 1864, Lay resigned from the diplomatic service and returned to England, where he engaged in financial affairs.

In December 1869, Lay was hired as a foreign advisor by the Meiji government of the Empire of Japan to assist in raising its first foreign loan, for 1 million pound sterling which was needed to finance the construction of Japan's first railways and telegraph lines. Having led the Japanese government to believe that he would raise the money through private investors, Lay instead floated Japanese sovereign bonds on the London Stock Exchange, arranging to have the interest on the bonds credited to his private accounts. When the Japanese government discovered the fraud, they cancelled his contract and appointed the British Oriental Bank in his place.

Two of Lay's brothers (Walter Thurlow Lay (1840–1917), Amoy Lay (1846–1911), two of his nephews (William George Lay (1862–1921), son of W.H. Lay, and Harry Lay (1894-?), son of Amoy Lay), and one grandnephew (Arthur Croall Hyde Lay (1900-) also served in the Chinese Maritime Customs Service.

== Legacy ==
Lay Road, beside Yangtzepoo Creek in old Shanghai's Hongkew district (although now part of Yangpu), was named for Lay. Following the Communist conquest of Shanghai in 1949, however, it was renamed Lanzhou Road.

== Notes ==
=== Bibliography ===
- Jack J. Gerson. Horatio Nelson Lay and Sino-British relations, 1854-1864. Cambridge, MA: Harvard University Press, 1972. ISBN 0-674-40625-7
- A.C. Hyde Lay. Four Generations in China, Japan and Korea. Edinburgh: Oliver & Boyd, 1952.
- Jonathan Spence. Western Advisers in China: To change China. London: Penguin, 1980.
- Britannica.com: Lay-Osborn flotilla
