= Sherard Osborn =

English rear admiral and polar explorer

Rear-Admiral Sherard Osborn CB FRS
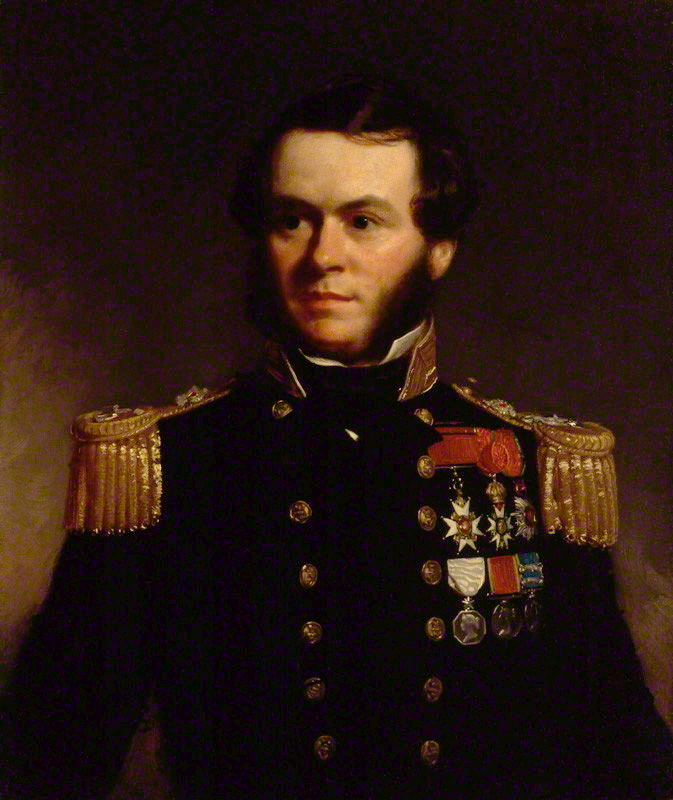
- Born: 25 April 1822; Madras, British India
- Died: 6 May 1875 (aged 53); London, Middlesex, England
- Military career
- Branch: Royal Navy
- Service years: 1837–1875
- Rank: Rear-Admiral
- Wars: First Opium War; Crimean War; Second Opium War
- Awards: Companion of the Order of the Bath (1856)

Sherard Osborn CB FRS (25 April 1822 – 6 May 1875) was a Royal Navy admiral and Arctic explorer.

== Biography ==
Born in Madras, he was the son of an Indian army officer. Osborn entered the navy as a first-class volunteer in 1837, serving until 1844 on HMS Hyacinth, HMS Clio, and HMS Volage.

In 1838, he was entrusted with the command of a gunboat at the attack on Kedah in the Malay Peninsula, and was present at the Battle of Canton in 1841, and at the Battle of Woosung in 1842. From 1844 until 1848, he was gunnery mate and lieutenant on HMS Collingwood, the flagship of Sir George Seymour in the Pacific.

He took a prominent part in 1849 in advocating a new search expedition for Sir John Franklin, and in 1850 was appointed to the command of the steam-tender HMS Pioneer (1850) in the Arctic expedition under Horatio Thomas Austin, in the course of which he performed a remarkable sledge-journey to the western extremity of Prince of Wales Island. He published an account of this voyage, entitled Stray Leaves from an Arctic Journal (1852), and was promoted to the rank of commander shortly afterwards.

In the new expedition of 1852–1854 under Sir Edward Belcher he again took part as commander of Pioneer. In 1856, he published the journals of Captain Robert McClure, giving a narrative of the discovery of the Northwest Passage. Early in 1855, he was called to active service in the Crimean War as the captain of HMS Vesuvius (1839). After seeing considerable action in the Black Sea he was promoted to post-rank in August 1855, and was appointed to HMS Medusa, in which he commanded the Sea of Azov squadron until the end of the war. For these services he was appointed a Companion of the Order of the Bath, awarded the Legion of Honour, and the Turkish Order of the Medjidie.

In 1859 he published the work A cruise in Japanese waters, The fight on the Peiho and some of the first Japanese illustrations (since a shipment in made 1620 by John Saris) which he published initially in the Once a Week periodical which Osborn acquired in Edo in 1859.

As captain of HMS Furious, he took a prominent part in the operations of the Second Opium War, and performed a piece of difficult and intricate navigation in taking his ship up the Yangtse to Hankow in 1858. He returned to England in broken health in 1859, and at this time contributed a number of articles on naval and Chinese topics to Blackwood's Magazine, and wrote The Career, Last Voyage and Fate of Sir John Franklin (1860).

In 1861, he commanded HMS Donegal in the Gulf of Mexico during the Second French intervention in Mexico, and in 1862, undertook the command of a squadron fitted out by the Chinese government for the suppression of piracy on the coast of China. Owing to the non-fulfilment of the condition that he should receive orders from the imperial government only, he quit the appointment.

=== Lay-Osborn Flotilla ===
During the Taiping Rebellion the Chinese government wished to regain control over Nanjing, which had been captured by the rebel forces in 1853 and declared their capital, but lacked the necessary ships to bring troops down the Yangtze River and to provide fire support. The Chinese government turned to the British for help, who agreed to provide assistance in order to bring stability to their commerce in China.

The Chinese Emperor, exiled to Jehol, agreed to a proposal presented by British ambassador Sir Frederic Bruce in July 1861 to purchase British gunboats. Robert Hart, interpreter of the Imperial Maritime Customs Service is given credit for creating the proposal. Prince Gong, the head of the Zongli Yamen, appointed Horatio Nelson Lay as Inspector General of the new flotilla. Lay left China for England on 14 March 1862 with written instructions from Prince Gong.

Queen Victoria agreed to the proposal on 2 September 1862 and gave permission to equip the vessels and hire crews. Lay appointed Captain Sherard Osborn as commander of the flotilla.

On 13 February 1863 the "Lay-Osborn" flotilla, also known as the Osborn or "Vampire" Fleet, with seven steam cruisers and a supply ship left England, arriving in China in September 1863. Upon reaching China, Osborn refused to take any orders from local Chinese officers, stating that his agreement with Lay stipulated that any Chinese orders must come directly from the Tongzhi Emperor, as transmitted via Lay. The Imperial court refused to ratify this, and Osborn resigned in pique on 9 November 1863, disbanded the flotilla, and sent the ships back to England without them having fired a shot. Lay was fired that same year by the Chinese government and replaced with Sir Robert Hart.

=== Later ===
In 1864, he was appointed to the command of HMS Royal Sovereign, the first British turret-armed battleship, in order to test the turret system of shipbuilding. In 1865, he became agent to the Great Indian Peninsula Railway Company, and two years later was made managing director of the Telegraph Construction and Maintenance Company, a post that he held until 1874. From 1869 he was a Director of the International Mid-Channel Telegraph Co. Ltd.

In 1871, he was appointed as captain of HMS Hercules in the Channel Fleet. On 12 June 1873, he was appointed rear admiral.

His interest in Arctic exploration had never ceased, and in 1873, he induced Commander Albert Hastings Markham to undertake a summer voyage for the purpose of testing the conditions of ice-navigation with the aid of steam. The result of this summer voyage was the British Arctic Expedition, under Sir George Nares. Osborn became a member of the expedition committee.

== Death ==
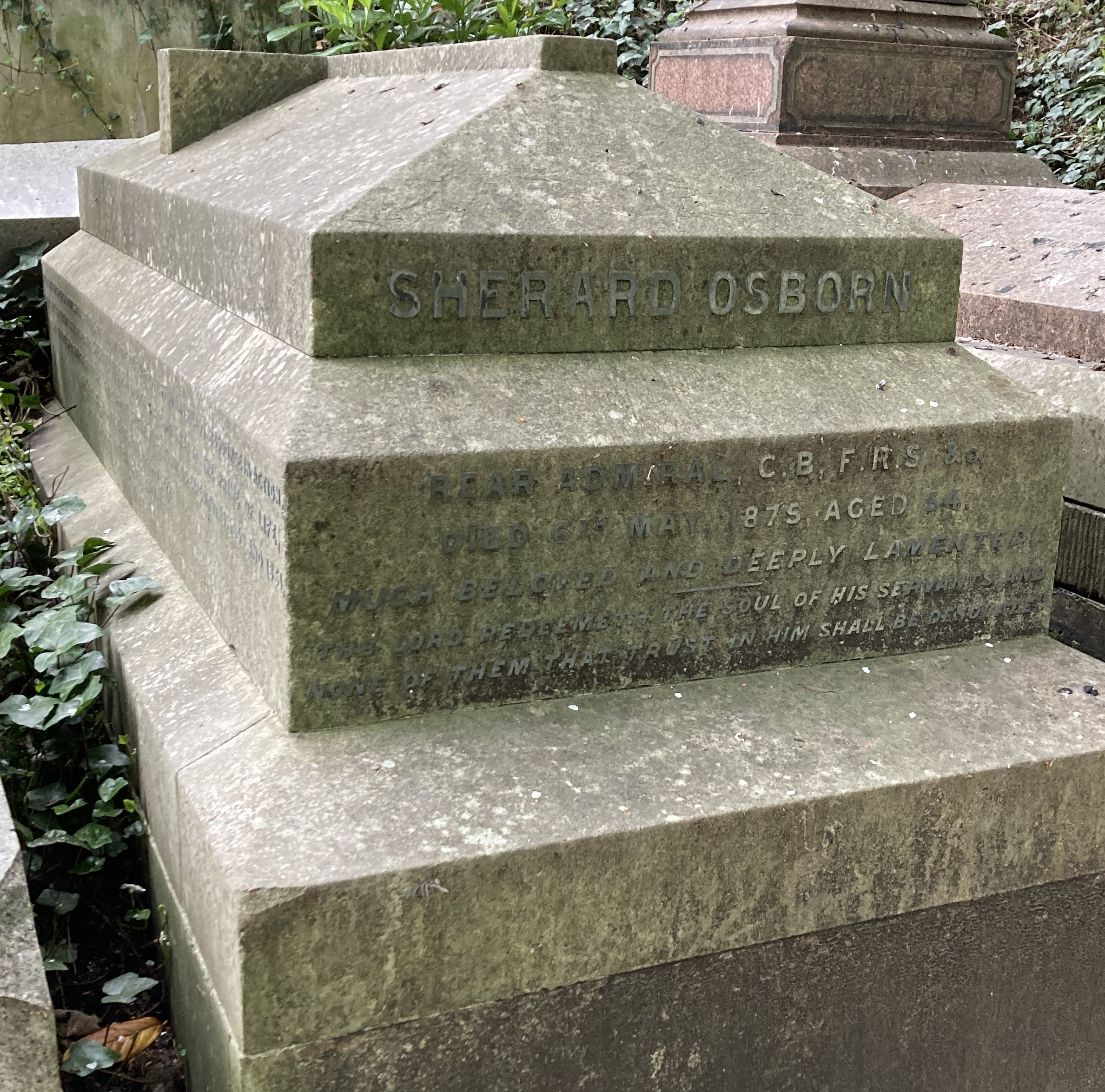
Grave of Sherard Osborn in Highgate Cemetery, London

Osborn died in London on 6 May 1875, a few days after the expedition had sailed. His body was interred at Highgate Cemetery on 10 May 1875 with the funeral attended by many of those who had served with him in the Royal Navy.

A cable ship was named for him and the SS Sherard Osborn was launched in 1878, for the Eastern Extension, Australasia and China Telegraph Company.
