= Timeline of Shanghai =

Coordinates: 31.2°N 121.5°E

The following is a timeline of the history of the city of Shanghai in China.

== Prior to 1800 ==
- 5th-7th c. CE - Fishing village develops where Suzhou Creek enters the Huangpu River.
- 751 CE - Area becomes part of Huating county.
- 976 CE - Longhua Temple rebuilt.
- 12th c. - Market town develops.
- 1216 - Jing'an Temple built.
- 1292 - Town becomes county seat.
- 1294 - Wen Miao (temple) active.
- 1554 - City walls constructed.
- 1732 - Customs office relocated to Shanghai from Songjiang.
- 1780 - Yu Garden opens.
- 1789 - Guyi Garden becomes communal property.

== 1800-1900 ==
- 1842
  - 19 June: Shanghai taken by British forces.
  - Shanghai opens to foreigners per Treaty of Nanking.
- 1843 Captain George Balfour appointed British consul.
- 1845
  - David Sassoon & Sons in business.
  - British settlement established on outskirts of Old City.
- 1846 - Richards' Hotel and Restaurant in business.
- 1849 - French Concession granted.
- 1850
  - North-China Herald newspaper begins publication.
  - Collège Saint Ignace founded.
- 1851 - Jardine, Matheson & Co. branch built.
- 1853
  - Small Swords Society occupies Old City.
  - April: Shanghai Volunteer Corps organized.
- 1854
  - Imperial Maritime Custom Offices installed.
  - Shanghai Municipal Council formed by westerners.
- 1855 - Shanghai Race Club founded.
- 1856 - Wills' Bridge constructed.
- 1857 - Royal Asiatic Society North-China Branch established.
- 1859 - Astor House Hotel in business.
- 1860
  - August: Taiping rebels unsuccessfully attempt to take city.
  - New Northern Gate built into city wall.
- 1861
  - Battle of Shanghai (1861).
  - Correspondent's Club formed by British residents.
- 1862
  - American settlement established.
  - Saint Joseph's Church consecrated.
- 1863 - Hongkou becomes part of American Concession.
- 1865
  - Kiangnan Arsenal and Long Men College established.
  - Hongkong and Shanghai Banking Corporation branch opens.
  - British Supreme Court for China established.
  - Gas lighting introduced.
- 1866 - Butterfield & Swire in business.
- 1868 - Musee de Zikawei founded.
- 1869 - Holy Trinity Church consecrated; designed by George Gilbert Scott.
- 1871 - August: Typhoon.
- 1872 - Shen Bao newspaper begins publication.
- 1874
  - Rickshaws introduced.
  - Natural history museum established by Royal Asiatic Society North-China Branch.
- 1876 - Woosung Railway begins operating.
- 1881 - Population: 302,767.
- 1882
  - Jade Buddha Temple founded.
  - Electricity introduced.
- 1884 - Dianshizhai-huabao (magazine) begins publication.
- 1889 - Ostasiatischer Lloyd newspaper begins publication.
- 1895 - Population: 411,753.
- 1896 - Nanyang Public School and Consulate-General of Russia in Shanghai established.
- 1897
  - April: wheelbarrow riots
  - 22 June: British nationals conduct jubilee events.
- 1898
  - Songhu Railway begins operating.
  - Bubbling Well cemetery established.

== 1900-2000 ==
=== 1900s ===
- 1901 - Hardoon & Company in business.
- 1905 - Kiangnan Shipyard and Fudan College established.
- 1907 - Waibaidu Bridge constructed.
- 1908
  - Nanjing-Shanghai Railway, Shanghai South railway station, Palace Hotel, and New Stage built.
  - Electric tram begins operating.
  - Art exhibit held in Shanghai Mutual Telephone Company building.
  - Hongkou cinema opens.
- 1909
  - Shanghai railway station and Shanghai Industrial College established.
  - Shanghai–Hangzhou Railway begins operating.
  - New gates built into city wall.

=== 1910s ===
- 1910
  - St. Ignatius Cathedral and Shanghai Club Building constructed.
  - Shanghai Oil Painting Institute, and Eastern City Women's Art School founded.
- 1912 - Old City walls dismantled.
- 1913 - Shanghai Art School, Women's Art and Embroidery Institute, and Xinmin Theater Research Society founded.
- 1914 - Trolleybus begins operating along Fokein Road.
- 1916 - Asia Building and Union Building constructed on The Bund.
- 1917
  - Millard's Review of the Far East begins publication.
  - Sincere Department Store branch in business.

=== 1920s ===
- 1920 - Shanghai Mint established.
- 1921
  - July: Chinese Communist Party founded during meeting in Xintiandi.
  - Mingxing Film Company founded.
- 1923
  - Hongqiao Airport in operation.
  - Hongkong and Shanghai Banking Corporation building constructed.
- 1924 - General Post Office Building and North China Daily News Building constructed.
- 1925
  - 30 May: Protest quashed; May Thirtieth Movement launched.
  - Shanghai East Library opens.
  - Tianyi Film Company in business.
  - Institute of Chartered Accountants organized.
- 1927
  - Shanghai Commune of 1927 active.
  - 12 April: Shanghai massacre of 1927.
  - 7 July: Huang Fu becomes mayor.
  - Shanghai Conservatory of Music founded.
  - Customs House, Zhapu Road Bridge, and Ohel Moishe Synagogue built.
  - City becomes a special municipality.
- 1928 - Fahua District becomes part of city.
- 1929
  - Chang Ch'ün becomes mayor.
  - Shanghai Stock Exchange formed.
  - Xinmin Po and Shanghai Evening Post & Mercury newspapers begin publication.
  - Sassoon House built.

=== 1930s ===
- 1930 - Nanking Theatre founded.
- 1932
  - January 28 Incident
  - January: Wu Tiecheng becomes mayor.
  - Grand Theatre rebuilt.
- 1933 - Paramount Ballroom opens.
- 1934 - Shanghai Joint Savings Society Building constructed.
- 1935
  - EWO Brewery Ltd. in business.
  - Sheshan Basilica and Broadway Mansions built.
- 1937
  - April: Yu Hung-Chun becomes mayor.
  - 13 August - 26 November: Battle of Shanghai; Japanese occupation begins.
  - 26 October - 1 November: Defense of Sihang Warehouse.
  - Bank of China Building constructed.
- 1938 - Wen Hui Bao newspaper begins publication.
- 1939 - Shanghai Jewish Chronicle begins publication.

=== 1940s ===
- 1940 - November: Chen Gongbo becomes mayor.
- 1943 - British and American concessions end.
- 1944 - December: Zhou Fohai becomes mayor.
- 1945
  - Japanese occupation ends.
  - August: K. C. Wu becomes mayor.
  - City divided into 30 administrative districts.
  - Shanghai Theatre Academy established.
- 1946 - French concession ends.
- 1947 – Constitution of the Republic of China passes.
- 1949
  - Rao Shushi becomes Shanghai Party Committee Secretary.
  - May: Chen Yi becomes mayor.
  - May–June: Shanghai Campaign.
  - Jiefang Daily newspaper begins publication.
  - Shanghai Film Studio founded.
  - October: Proclamation of the People's Republic of China.
  - Shanghai residents find refuge on the island of Taiwan with some fleeing to Hong Kong.

=== 1950s ===
- 1950
  - Chen Yi becomes Party Committee Secretary.
  - Shanghai Women's Federation founded.
- 1951 - Shanghai Shenhua Football Club formed.
- 1952 - Shanghai Museum, Shanghai Banking School, and Shanghai Chinese Orchestra founded.
- 1953 - Population: 6,204,417.
- 1954
  - Ke Qingshi becomes Party Committee Secretary.
  - Shanghai Zoo and Shanghai Teachers Training College established.
  - Jing'an Park developed.
- 1955
  - Shanghai Exhibition Centre completed
  - Hongkou Stadium opens.
  - Shanghai Internal Combustion Engine Components Company in business.
- 1956 - Shanghai Natural History Museum established.
- 1958
  - Shanghai Academy of Social Sciences founded.
  - Ke Qingshi becomes mayor.
  - Baoshan, Fengxian, Jiadang, Jinshan, Qingpu, Songjiang districts and Chongming County become part of city.
- 1959 - Drunken Bai Garden opens.

=== 1960s ===
- 1960 - Shanghai Institute of Foreign Languages established.
- 1961 - Yu Garden opens.
- 1964 - Population: 10,816,500.
- 1965
  - Chen Pixian becomes CPC Party chief.
  - Cao Diqiu becomes mayor.
  - Cucumber Lane renovated.
- 1966 - Cultural Revolution begins.
- 1967
  - Shanghai People's Commune active.
  - Zhang Chunqiao becomes mayor.

=== 1970s ===
- 1970
  - One Strike-Three Anti Campaign.
  - Population: 10,820,000.
- 1971 - Zhang Chunqiao becomes Party Committee Secretary.
- 1972 - Richard Nixon visits city.
- 1974 - Shanghai Botanical Garden established.
- 1976 - Su Zhenhua becomes Party Committee Secretary.
- 1978 - Shanghai Translation Publishing House founded.
- 1979
  - Peng Chong becomes Party Committee Secretary.
  - Sister city relationship established with San Francisco, USA.

=== 1980s ===
- 1980
  - Shanghai Bar Association founded.
  - Chen Guodong becomes Party Committee Secretary.
- 1981 - Wang Daohan becomes mayor.
- 1982 - Population: 6,292,960 city; 11,859,700 (urban agglomeration).
- 1983 - Shanghai History & Cultural Relics Showroom opens.
- 1984 - Shanghai University of Political Science and Law founded.
- 1985
  - Rui Xingwen becomes Party Committee Secretary.
  - Jiang Zemin becomes mayor.
  - Shanghai Daoist Association established.
  - Wenhui Book Review begins publication.
- 1987 - Jiang Zemin becomes Party Committee Secretary.
- 1988
  - Zhu Rongji becomes mayor.
  - Jin Jiang Tower built.
- 1989
  - Protests.
  - Zhu Rongji becomes Party Committee Secretary.

=== 1990s ===
- 1990 - Population: 13,341,900.
- 1991
  - Nanpu Bridge and Yangpu Bridge open.
  - Wu Bangguo becomes Party Committee Secretary.
  - Huang Ju becomes mayor.
  - The Chinese Republic on Taiwan unofficially abandoned the claims to Shanghai after amending the constitution.
- 1992 - Shanghai Star newspaper begins publication.
- 1993
  - Pudong Special Economic Zone established.
  - Shanghai Metro begins operation.
  - Shanghai International Film Festival begins.
- 1994
  - Huang Ju becomes Party Committee Secretary.
  - Oriental Pearl Tower constructed in Lujiazui.
  - Australian Chamber of Commerce Shanghai established.
- 1995
  - Xu Kuangdi becomes mayor.
  - Dajing Ge Pavilion museum opens (approximate date).
- 1996
  - Shanghai Library building opens.
  - Shanghai Biennale art exhibit begins.
  - Yan'an Elevated Road and King Tower built.
  - Canadian Chamber of Commerce in Shanghai established.
- 1997 - Xupu Bridge opens.
- 1998
  - Shanghai Grand Theatre opens.
  - Jin Mao Tower, Shanghai Sen Mao International Building, Shanghai Futures Building, and Lippo Plaza built.
- 1999
  - Shanghai Pudong International Airport begins operating.
  - Shanghai Century Publishing Group established.
  - Shanghai Daily newspaper begins publication.
  - Shanghai public transport card launched.
- 2000
  - International Ocean Shipping Building, World Finance Tower, and Bank of China Tower constructed.
  - Fireworks Festival begins.
  - Population: 16,407,700.

== 21st century ==
=== 2000s ===
- 2001
  - Chen Liangyu becomes mayor.
  - Plaza 66 and Pudong International Information Port built.
  - Shanghai Film Group Corporation in business.
  - Benelux Business Association established.
- 2002
  - Chen Liangyu becomes Party Committee Secretary.
  - Shanghai Ocean Aquarium and Super Brand Mall open.
  - Shanghai Fashion Week begins.
  - Shanghai Golden Eagles baseball team formed.
- 2003
  - Han Zheng becomes mayor.
  - Lupu Bridge opens.
  - Tomorrow Square, Shanghai Dong Hai Plaza, Aurora Plaza, and Raffles Square built.
  - Nanhui New City construction begins.
- 2004
  - Shanghai Maglev Train begins operating.
  - Shanghai Railway Museum and Shanghai International Circuit open.
  - Chinese Grand Prix begins.
- 2005
  - Shanghai Institute of Visual Art and Shanghai City Symphonic Orchestra established.
  - Donghai Bridge, Shimao International Plaza, Grand Gateway Shanghai, Longemont Shanghai, Citigroup Tower, and Bank of Shanghai Headquarters built.
  - Shanghai Oriental Art Center and Qi Zhong Stadium inaugurated.
- 2006
  - Han Zheng becomes Party Committee Secretary.
  - Shanghai pension scandal.
  - Island6 Art Center opens.
  - Chenghuang Miao (temple) restored.
  - PLA Unit 61398 active (approximate date).
- 2007
  - Xi Jinping becomes Party Committee Secretary, succeeded by Yu Zhengsheng.
  - Oasis Skyway Garden Hotel built.
- 2008 - Shanghai World Financial Center, One Lujiazui, and Zhongrong Jasper Tower built.
- 2009
  - Shanghai Pride begins.
  - Shanghai Yangtze River Tunnel and Bridge and Happy Valley (amusement park) open.
  - Shanghai Masters tennis tournament held.

=== 2010s ===
- 2010
  - Expo 2010 Shanghai China (world expo) held.
  - Shanghai Arena opens.
  - Minpu Bridge and Shanghai Wheelock Square built.
  - 15 November: Fire on Jiaozhou Road, Jing'an District.
  - Population: 23,019,148.
- 2011
  - Beijing–Shanghai High-Speed Railway begins operating.
  - Huamin King Tower built.
- 2012
  - November: Han Zheng becomes Party Committee Secretary.
  - December: Yang Xiong becomes mayor.
  - Power Station of Art opens.
  - Turkish Chamber of Commerce established.
- 2014
  - 31 December: 2014 Shanghai stampede
- 2016
  - June 16: Shanghai Disneyland Park opened.
- 2017
  - 26 April : Shanghai Tower officially opened its sightseeing deck to the public.
  - 10 June: Protest against changes to housing regulations by the municipal authorities on Nanjing Road

== See also ==
- History of Shanghai
- List of historic buildings in Shanghai
- List of administrative divisions of Shanghai
- List of township-level divisions of Shanghai
- List of Shanghai Metro stations
- List of universities and colleges in Shanghai
- Major National Historical and Cultural Sites (Shanghai)
- List of economic and technological development zones in Shanghai
- Urbanization in China

== Bibliography ==
=== Published in the 19th century ===
- S. Wells Williams (1863), "Port of Shanghai", Chinese Commercial Guide (5th ed.), Hongkong: A. Shortrede & Co
- Charles J. Bullock (1884), "Yangtse Kiang: Shanghai", China Sea Directory (2nd ed.), London: Admiralty Hydrographic Office
- J.W. MacLellan (1889), Story of Shanghai, from the Opening of the Port to Foreign Trade, North-China Herald Office, OCLC 16835850, OL 23452930M

=== Published in the 20th century ===
- A.M. Murray (1907), "Shanghai and the 'Yellow Peril'", Imperial outposts from a strategical and commercial aspect, London: John Murray
- Arnold Wright, ed. (1908), "Shanghai", Twentieth century impressions of Hongkong, Shanghai, and other treaty ports of China, London: Lloyd's Greater Britain Pub. Co.
- Carlos Augusto Montalto de Jesus (1909), Historic Shanghai, Shanghai: Shanghai Mercury, OCLC 5339784, OL 7016345M
- "Shanghai" . Encyclopædia Britannica. Vol. 24 (11th ed.). 1910. pp. 799–801.
- Claudius Madrolle (1912), "Shang-hai", Northern China, Paris: Hachette & Company, OCLC 8741409
- Mary Louise Ninde Gamewell (1916), The Gateway to China: Pictures of Shanghai, New York: Fleming H. Revell Company, OCLC 394602, OL 6593310M
- All About Shanghai. Shanghai: University Press. 1934.
- Rhoads Murphey (1953), Shanghai: Key to Modern China, Cambridge: Harvard University Press, OCLC 16740238
- Rhoads Murphey (1988). "Shanghai". In Mattei Dogan and John D. Kasarda (ed.). The Metropolis Era. Mega-Cities. Sage. ISBN 0803937903.
- Robert Eng (1989), "Transformation of a Semi-Colonial Port City: Shanghai, 1843-1941", in Frank Broeze (ed.), Brides of the Sea: Port Cities of Asia from the 16th-20th Centuries, Univ of Hawaii Press, ISBN 9780824812669
- Françoise Kreissler (1989). "La presse des refugies allemands a Shanghai". L'action culturelle allemande en Chine de la fin du 19e siècle à la Seconde Guerre mondiale (in French). Editions de la Maison des Sciences de l'Homme Paris.
- Tan Chenchang (1994), "Shanghai shi yanjiu sishinian (1949-1989)" [Forty years of historical research on Shanghai (1949-1989)], Jindai Shanghai tansuo lu (A record of explorations of modern Shanghai) (in Chinese), Shanghai
- Takahashi Kosuke and Furuye Tadao, ed. (1995). Shanhai shi (in Japanese). Tokyo. ISBN 4497954471.
- Schellinger and Salkin, ed. (1996). "Shanghai". International Dictionary of Historic Places: Asia and Oceania. UK: Routledge. ISBN 9781884964046.
- Christian Henriot and Zheng Zu'an (1999). Altas de Shanghai: Espaces et representations de 1849 a nos jours (in French). Paris.
- Yingjin Zhang (1999). Cinema & Urban Culture in Shanghai, 1922-1943. Stanford University Press.
- David Fraser, “Inventing Oasis: Luxury Housing Advertisements and Reconfiguring Domestic Space in Shanghai,” chapter 2 in The Consumer Revolution in Urban China (Berkeley: University of California Press, 2000) 25-53.

=== Published in the 21st century ===
2000s

- Bradley Mayhew (2001), Shanghai, Lonely Planet, OL 8314702M
- Jeffrey N. Wasserstrom (2001). "New Approaches to Old Shanghai: A Review Essay". Journal of Interdisciplinary History. 32.
- "Shanghai". Understanding Slums: Case Studies for the Global Report 2003. United Nations Human Settlements Programme and University College London. 2003.
- Yin Xu; Xiaoqun Xu (2003). "Becoming Professional: Chinese Accountants in early 20th Century Shanghai". Accounting Historians Journal. 30.
- Xiaoqing Ye (2003), The Dianshizhai Pictorial: Shanghai Urban Life, 1884-1898, Center for Chinese Studies, The University of Michigan, ISBN 9780892641628
- Hanchao Lu (2004), Beyond the Neon Lights: Everyday Shanghai in the Early Twentieth Century, University of California Press, ISBN 9780520243781
- Weiping Wu and Shahid Yusuf (2004). "Shanghai". In Josef Gugler (ed.). World Cities beyond the West: Globalization, Development, and Inequality. Cambridge University Press. ISBN 0521830036.
- Piper Gaubatz, “Globalization and the Development of New Central Business Districts in Beijing, Shanghai and Guangzhou,” chapter 6 in Restructuring the Chinese City: Changing Society, Economy and Space (New York: Routledge, 2005) 98-121.
- Wing Chung Ho (2006). "From Resistance to Collective Action in a Shanghai Socialist "Model Community": From the Late 1940s to Early 1970s". Journal of Social History. 40.
- Stephanie Po-Yin Chung (2007). "Moguls of the Chinese Cinema: The Story of the Shaw Brothers in Shanghai, Hong Kong and Singapore, 1924-2002". Modern Asian Studies. 41 (4): 665–682. doi:10.1017/s0026749x06002423. S2CID 145666838.
- Alexander Townsend Des Forges (2007). Mediasphere ShangHai: The Aesthetics of Cultural Production. University of Hawaii Press.
- Jeffrey N. Wasserstrom (2007). "Is Global Shanghai "Good to Think"? Thoughts on Comparative History and Post-Socialist Cities". Journal of World History.
- Jeffrey N. Wasserstrom (2008), Global Shanghai, 1850 - 2010, Abingdon, Oxon: Routledge, ISBN 9780415213271
- Jane Zheng (2009). "Private Tutorial Art Schools in the Shanghai Market Economy: The Shanghai Art School, 1913-1919". Modern China. 35.

2010s

- Shanghai, San Francisco: Asian Art Museum, Shanghai Museum, 2010, OL 24338798M
- "Encyclopedia of Shanghai". Shanghai Municipal Government. 2010. Archived from the original on 2015-01-10.
- Nick Pearce (2011). "Shanghai 1908: A. W. Bahr and China's First Art Exhibition". West 86th. 18.
