= Chong Hing Finance Center =

Building in Shanghai, China

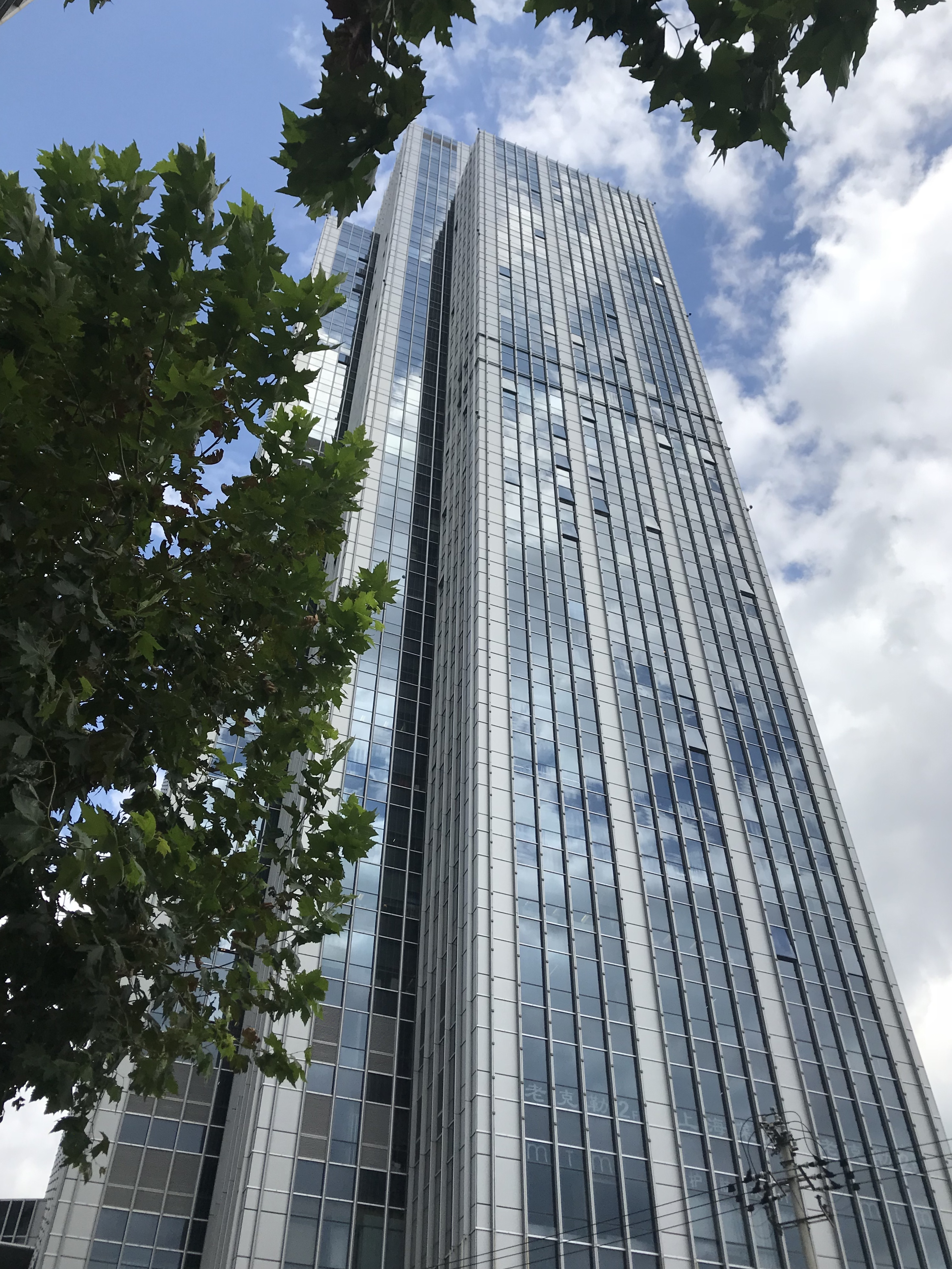
- The building's exterior in 2018
- Interactive map of the Chong Hing Finance Center area

General information
- Type: Finance Center
- Location: 288 Nanjing Road West, Shanghai, China
- Coordinates: 31.2341°N 121.4659°E

Technical details
- Floor count: 36

The Chong Hing Finance Center is a 36-storey Grade A commercial building, located at 288 Nanjing Road West in the Huang Pu District of Shanghai, China.

== See also ==
- List of tallest buildings in Shanghai
