= Ciros Plaza =

Building in Huangpu, Shanghai, China

Coordinates: 31.2334°N 121.4645°E

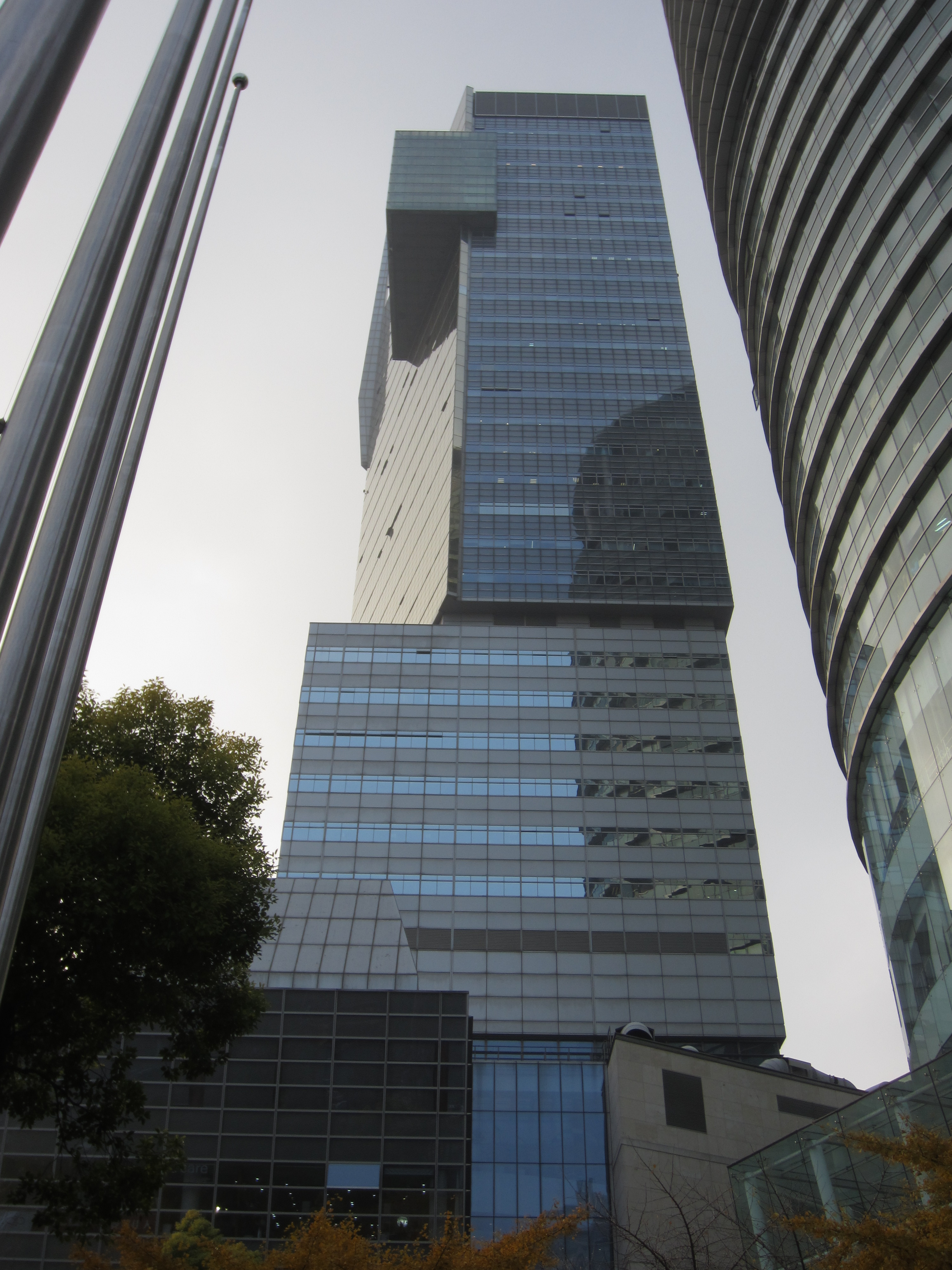
- The building's exterior, 2015
- Interactive map of the Ciros Plaza area

General information
- Location: 388 Nanjing Road West, Shanghai

Ciros Plaza, or Ciro's Plaza (仙乐斯广场), is a commercial office building and houses an eco-friendly shopping complex. It is located at 388 Nanjing Road West in Shanghai, China.

Ciro's Plaza is a 39-story skyscraper in Huangpu District with three basement levels. With a total floor area of 99,135 square meters (1,067,080 square feet), it houses diverse office, retail and dining spaces. The glass facade gives it an ultra-contemporary appearance but the construction, repair and maintenance of the building have strictly followed eco-friendly processes. Organic cosmetics and food stores, groceries, fashion boutiques, furniture and home decor shops are just some of the retailers here. Ciro's Plaza is also popular for its numerous coffeehouses and restaurants.

== See also ==
- List of tallest buildings in Shanghai
