= Maxdo Centre =

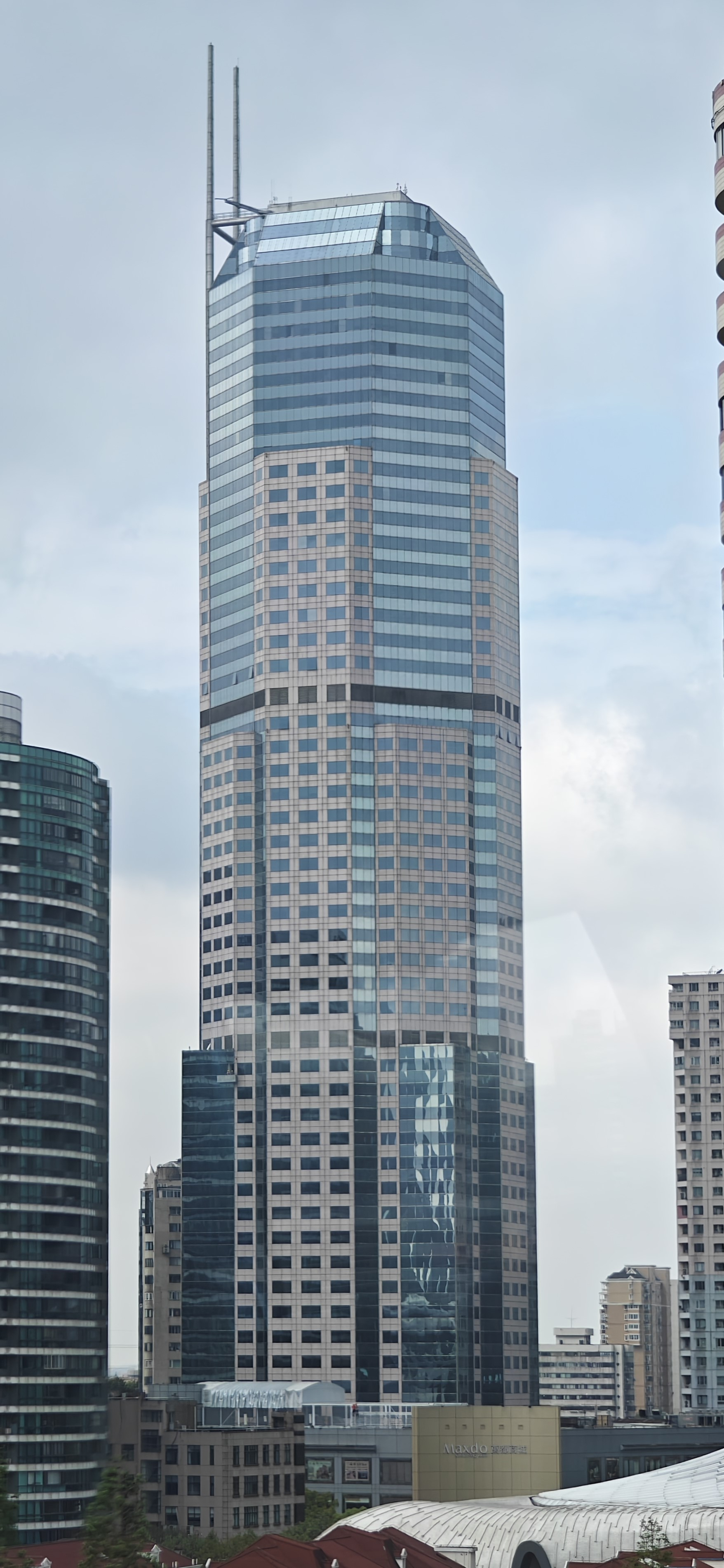
- Maxdo Centre in 2026
- Interactive map of the Maxdo Centre area

General information
- Type: Office
- Location: Changning District, Shanghai, China
- Coordinates: 31.206720°N 121.400101°E
- Completed: 2002

Height
- Antenna spire: 241 m (791 ft)
- Roof: 211 m (692 ft)

Technical details
- Floor count: 55
- Floor area: 132,800 m^{2} (1,429,000 sq ft)

Maxdo Centre is a skyscraper in Changning District, Shanghai, China. It is 241 metres high, and has 55 floors. Construction of the office tower was financed by Shanghai Social Security Fund and Pudong Development Bank. It was completed in 2002.

== See also ==
- List of tallest buildings in Shanghai
