= Xujiahui Center =

- 徐家汇中心
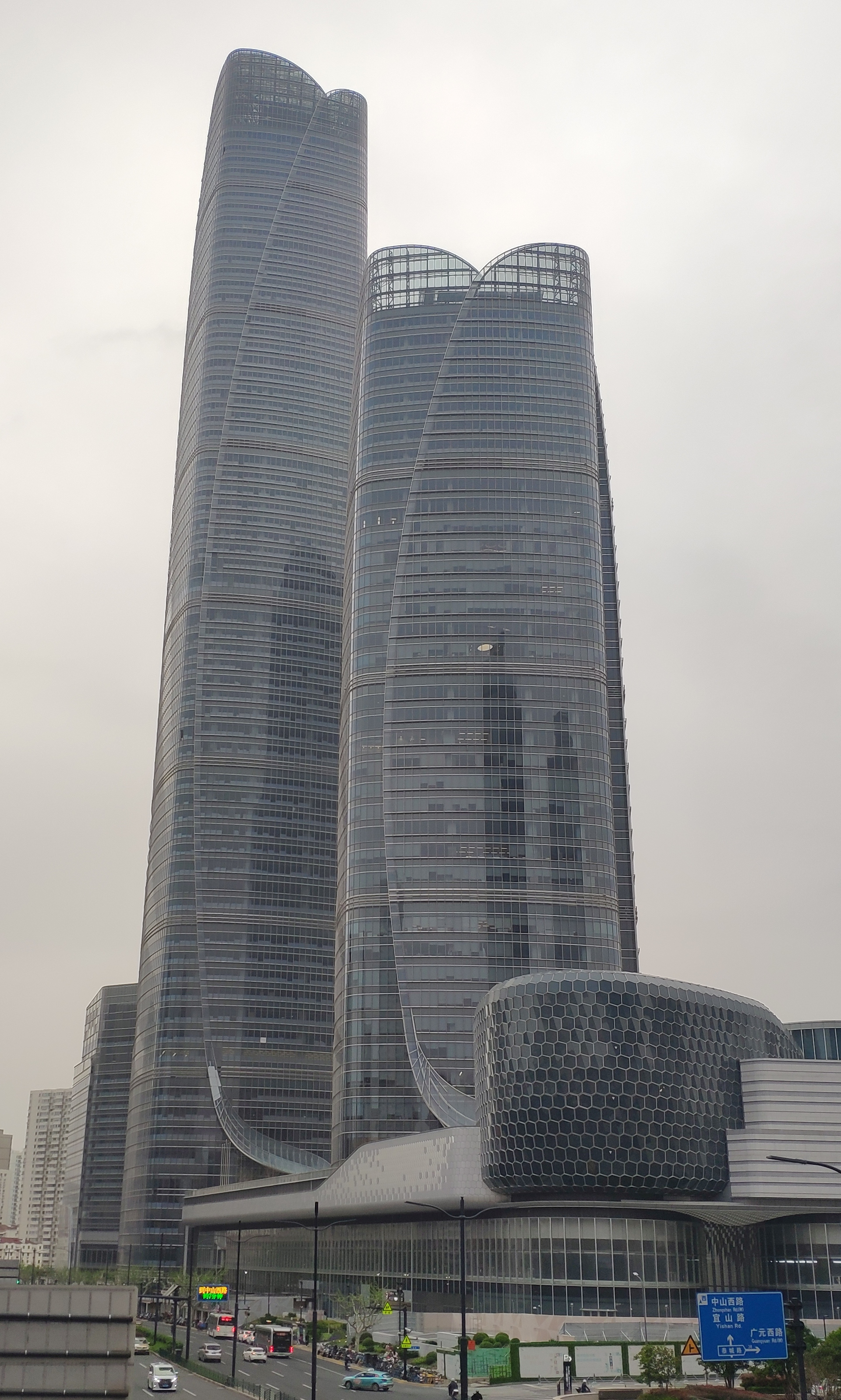
- Xujiahui Center in 2025
- Interactive map of the Xujiahui Center area

General information
- Status: Completed
- Type: Office
- Location: Hongqiao Road, Xujiahui, Shanghai, China
- Coordinates: 31.196°N 121.43°E
- Construction started: 2017
- Completed: 2025

Height
- Height: Tower 1: 370 m / 1,214 ft Tower 2: 220 m / 722 ft

Technical details
- Floor count: Tower 1: 70 Tower 2: 43

Design and construction
- Architects: Pelli Clarke & Partners; East China Architectural Design & Research Institute
- Developer: Sun Hung Kai Properties
- Main contractor: Shanghai Construction Group

The Xujiahui Center is a complex of skyscrapers in Shanghai, China. Upon its completion in 2025, the main tower is the fourth tallest building in Shanghai, after the Shanghai Tower, Shanghai World Financial Center, and the Jin Mao Tower.

== See also ==
- List of tallest buildings in Shanghai
- List of tallest buildings in China
- List of tallest buildings
