= Lumina Shanghai =

Skyscraper in Xuhui, Shanghai

- 星扬西岸中心
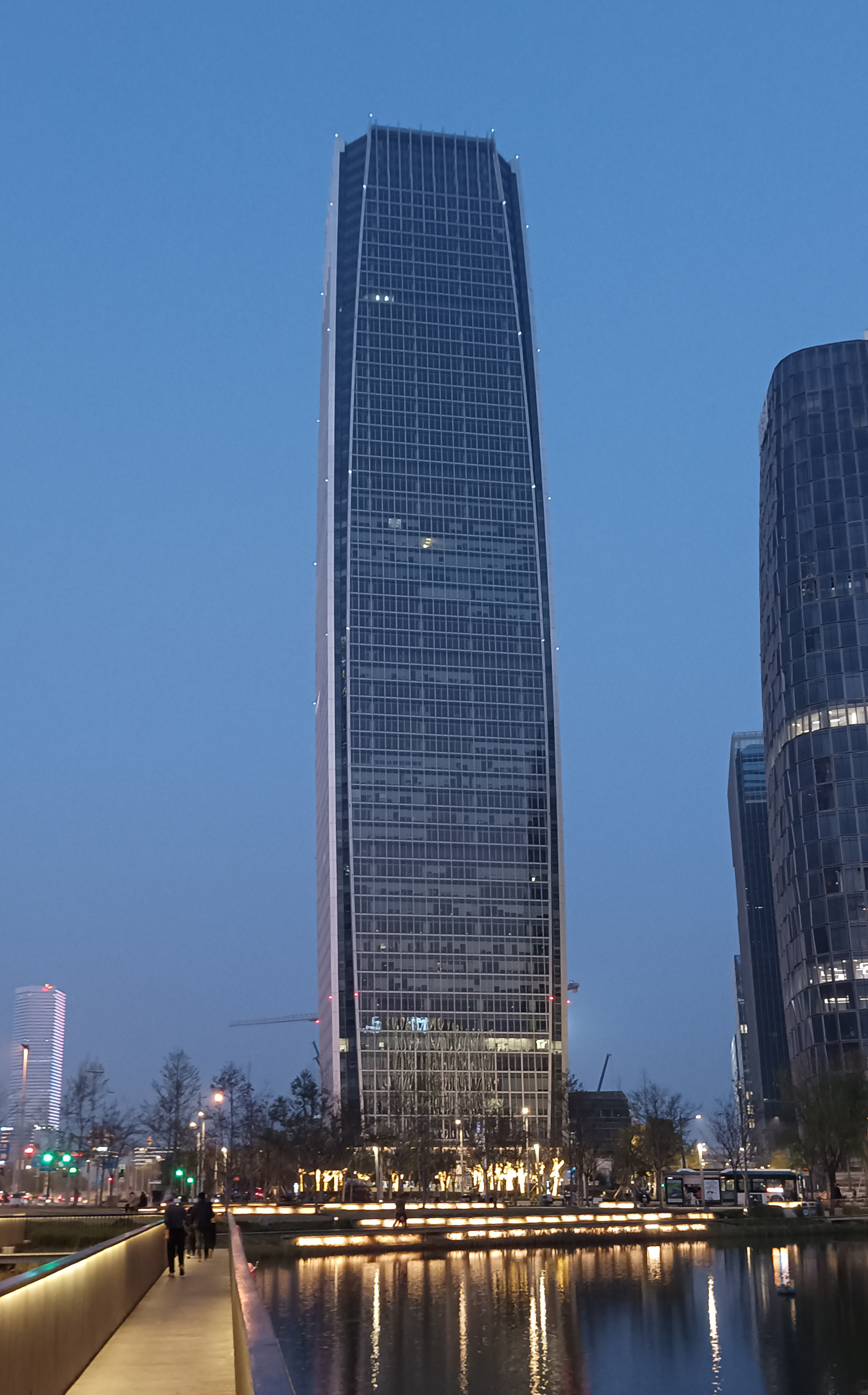
- Lumina Shanghai in 2024

General information
- Status: Completed
- Type: Shopping centre; office building
- Architectural style: Contemporary
- Location: 175 Longyao Road, Xuhui District, Shanghai, China
- Coordinates: 31.163460097708406°N 121.45651338045057°E
- Year built: 4
- Construction started: 2017
- Topped-out: 2021
- Completed: July 2022
- Client: Henderson Land Development

Height
- Height: 285.1 m (935 ft)

Technical details
- Structural system: Concrete-steel composite
- Floor count: 61
- Floor area: 254,498 m^{2} (2,739,390 sq ft)
- Lifts/elevators: 40
- Grounds: 18,622 m^{2} (200,450 sq ft)

Design and construction
- Architects: Xiaomei Lee, Raymon Chen
- Architecture firm: Gensler
- Engineer: Zhiqiang Zhang, of Arup Group
- Structural engineer: Wenjie He, Ligang Zhu, Shuanglan Wu, of Arup Group
- Services engineer: Lingfei Wang, Ning Xiao, of Arup Group
- Other designers: Facade: Zhiheng Cai, Yuan Qi, Lina Guo, Dongxia Wu, of Arup Group Interior: HASSELL Landscape: East China Architectural Design & Research Institute (Arcplus Group) Lighting: Brandston Partnership, Inc. BIM: isBIM Ltd.
- Main contractor: Shanghai Construction Group

Other information
- Parking: 1168 spaces; underground
- Public transit: 11 Longyao Road Station

Website
- www.shlumina.com

Lumina Shanghai (Chinese: 星扬西岸中心; pinyin: xīng yáng xī'àn zhōngxīn), also known as the Henderson Xuhui Tower, is a 61-floor contemporary skyscraper in Xuhui, Shanghai. It was designed by Xiaomei Lee and Raymon Chen of Gensler and built from 2017 to 2021. According to CTBUH, as of March 2024, at 285.1m, it is the tallest building in Xuhui, the seventh-tallest building in Shanghai, 151st-tallest in China, 180th-tallest in Asia, and 288th-tallest in the world. The building has received a LEED Gold pre-certification and a China Green 3-star certification for sustainability.

== Site ==
Lumina Shanghai is located in the waterfront area of Xuhui, a major development site outlined in the 'Shanghai Master Plan 2017-2035' by the Shanghai Municipal People's Government, where it is part of the 'central activity zone'. In the document, it calls for a 'Focus on building a core cultural and functional area of the Expo-Qiantan-Xuhui waterfront area, leading global functions such as innovation, creativity and culture', and also calls for the construction of landmarks in this area as well.

Neighbouring Lumina Shanghai, are the West Bund Media Port, West Bund Smart Valley, and West Bund Financial Centre, which are managed by state-owned Shanghai West Bund Development (Group) Co., Ltd, which is responsible for developing the Xuhui waterfront area.

The building is connected to Line 11 of the Shanghai Metro at Longyao Road station, on Exits 1 and 2. It is also connected to the West Bund Media Port through elevated paths.

== Architecture ==
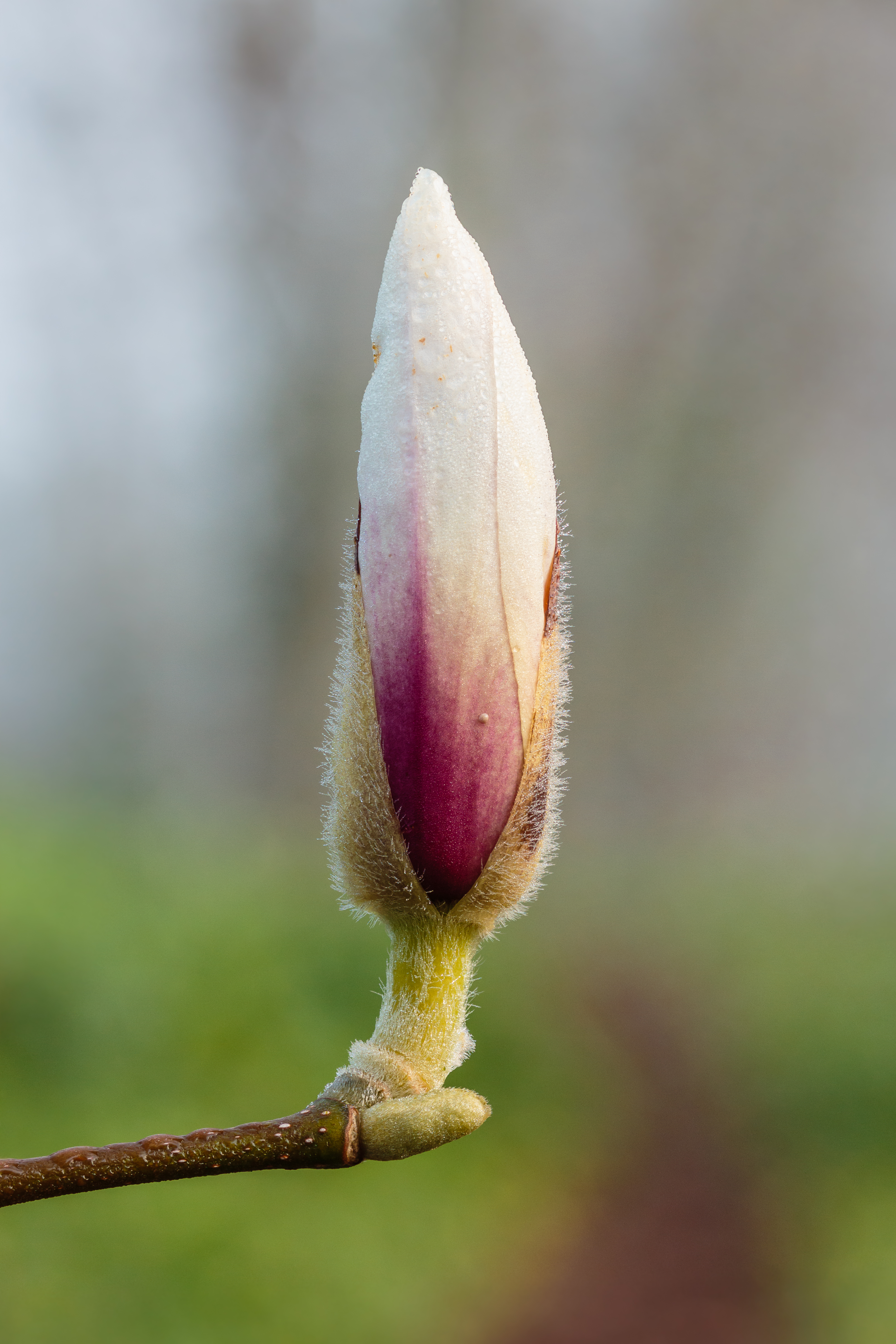
A Magnolia flower bud

Lumina Shanghai is a contemporary skyscraper that provides 254,498m^{2} of floor area for office and retail space, whilst occupying 18,622m^{2} of ground area.

Lumina Shanghai, inspired by Shanghai's city flower, the magnolia flower, is a cuboid with curved edges. The top, similar to the client, Henderson Land Development's, headquarters at the International Finance Centre, features a crown, with its design symbolising continued growth, inspired by a flower bud, and to boldly mark the highest point of the riverside.

The design for the façade features a transparent, glass, curved, curtain wall, which are designed to exaggerate the 'erect posture' of the building. The building uses many vertical decorative fins for sun-shading. The transparent design provides more natural lighting in the building. The curtain walls are cantilevered on the four corners of the building.

The lighting of the building features a strip of light down all corners, and the crown has multiple short vertical strips of light to emphasise it. The light temperature is 3000k in winter, as it is warmer and 'warms the city', and 4000k in winter.

== Engineering ==
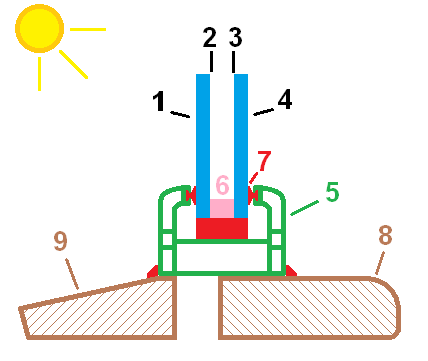
An Insulated Glass Unit (IGU)

The skyscraper uses a tube-in-tube system, where the inner core supports the building in combination with an external moment-resisting frame. The lift system is located within the core tube. Designers used building information modelling to optimise the size of the core tube so that more floor area could be used.

Designers used computational fluid dynamics to analyse the effects of wind resistance on the building and, considering the views as well, optimised the building's rotation.

The tower adopts an efficient lift system. Users would first arrive at the sky lobby from the ground floor via a double-cabin shuttle lift, then can transit to inter-regional lifts reaching different floors.

The design of the curtain walls combines high-performance insulating glass with vertical and horizontal aluminium decorative bars to create an efficient modular unit for the curtain walls.

=== Sustainability ===
The vertical fins provide shade, and the transparent façade increases natural lighting, reducing energy consumption. A building envelope system composed of LOW-E glass decreases heat loss, and a rainwater recycling system and solar energy water heating further reduce water and energy consumption, where 44.92% of water consumption is recycled.
