= Bocom Financial Towers =

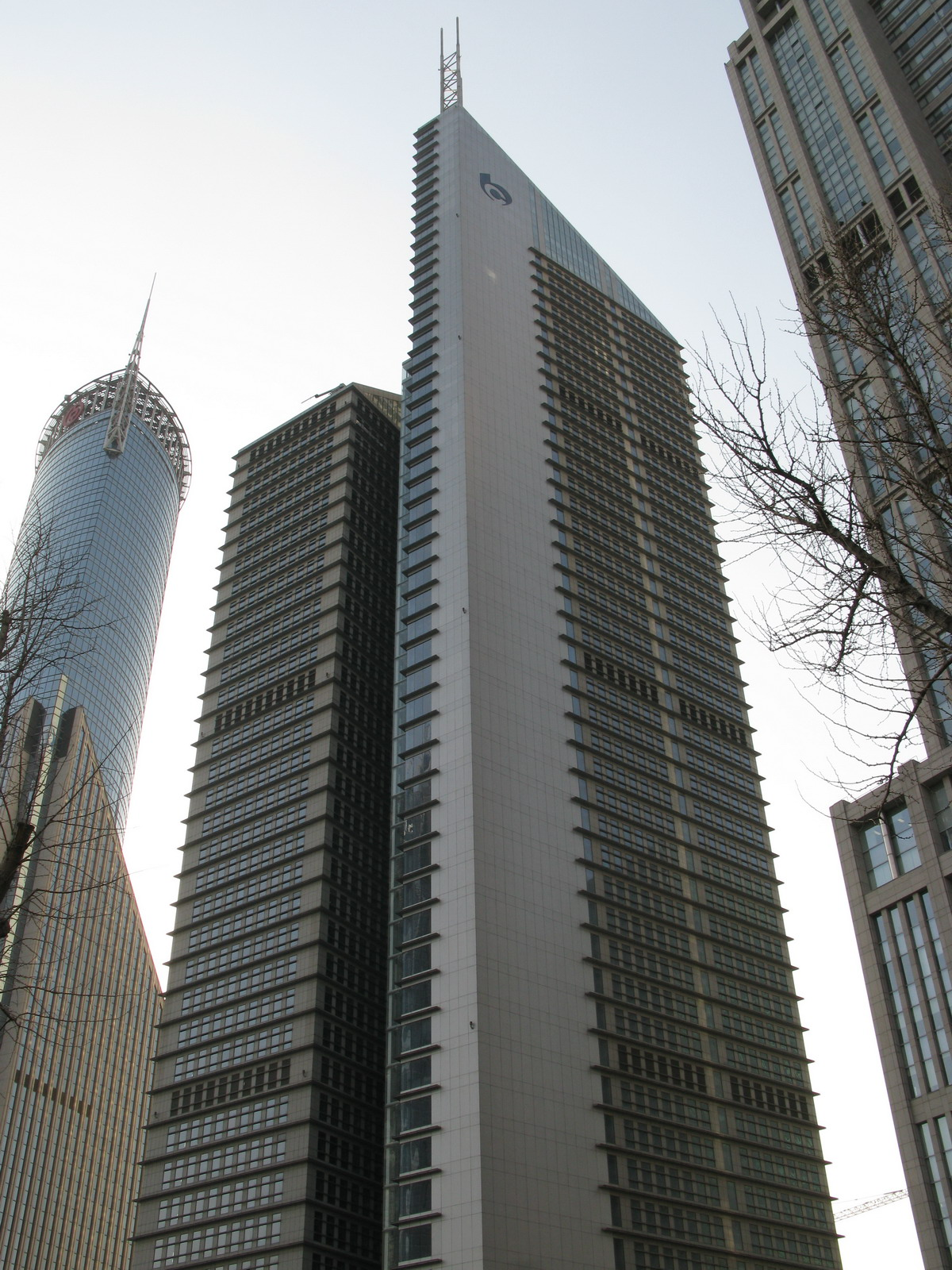
- Bocom Financial Towers in 2008
- Interactive map of the Bocom Financial Towers area

General information
- Type: Office
- Location: Pudong District, Shanghai, China
- Coordinates: 31.2414°N 121.499°E
- Completed: 2002

Height
- Roof: North tower: 230 m (755 ft); South tower: 197 m (646 ft)

Technical details
- Floor count: 52

Design and construction
- Architect: ABB Architekten

The Bocom Financial Towers (Chinese: 交银金融大厦) are two conjoined skyscrapers which reach 230 metres (755 feet) in height, the head office of Bank of Communications (Bocom). They are located in the Pudong District of Shanghai, China and are split into the North and South Towers. Both towers were designed by ABB Architekten. The North tower is the 810th tallest existing building in the world when measured up to the highest architectural point.

An atrium connects the two towers together and reaches a height of 163.4 metres. A swimming pool offering views over all of Shanghai is located on the 48th floor of the North Tower.

== North Tower statistics ==
Construction of the tower began in 1997 and was completed in 2002. It is 52 stories tall with four basement levels. The height of the tower is 230 metres. At its widest point, the tower is 15.8 metres wide and at its narrowest it is 9.75 metres wide. It has a length of 31 metres.

== South Tower statistics ==
Construction of the South Tower was completed in 1999, three years before the North Tower. It has 42 floors above ground and four below ground level. It has a roof height of 197.4 metres and the top floor is located 171.6 metres up. At its widest point, the tower is 15.8 metres wide and at its narrowest, it is 9.75 metres wide. It has a length of 31 metres.

== In popular culture ==
It was one of the three buildings part of the filming of Mission: Impossible III starring Tom Cruise. Ethan Hunt was shown sliding down the angled roof of the south tower.

== See also ==
- List of tallest buildings in Shanghai
