= Qiantan Center =

Skyscraper in Shanghai, China

- 前滩中心
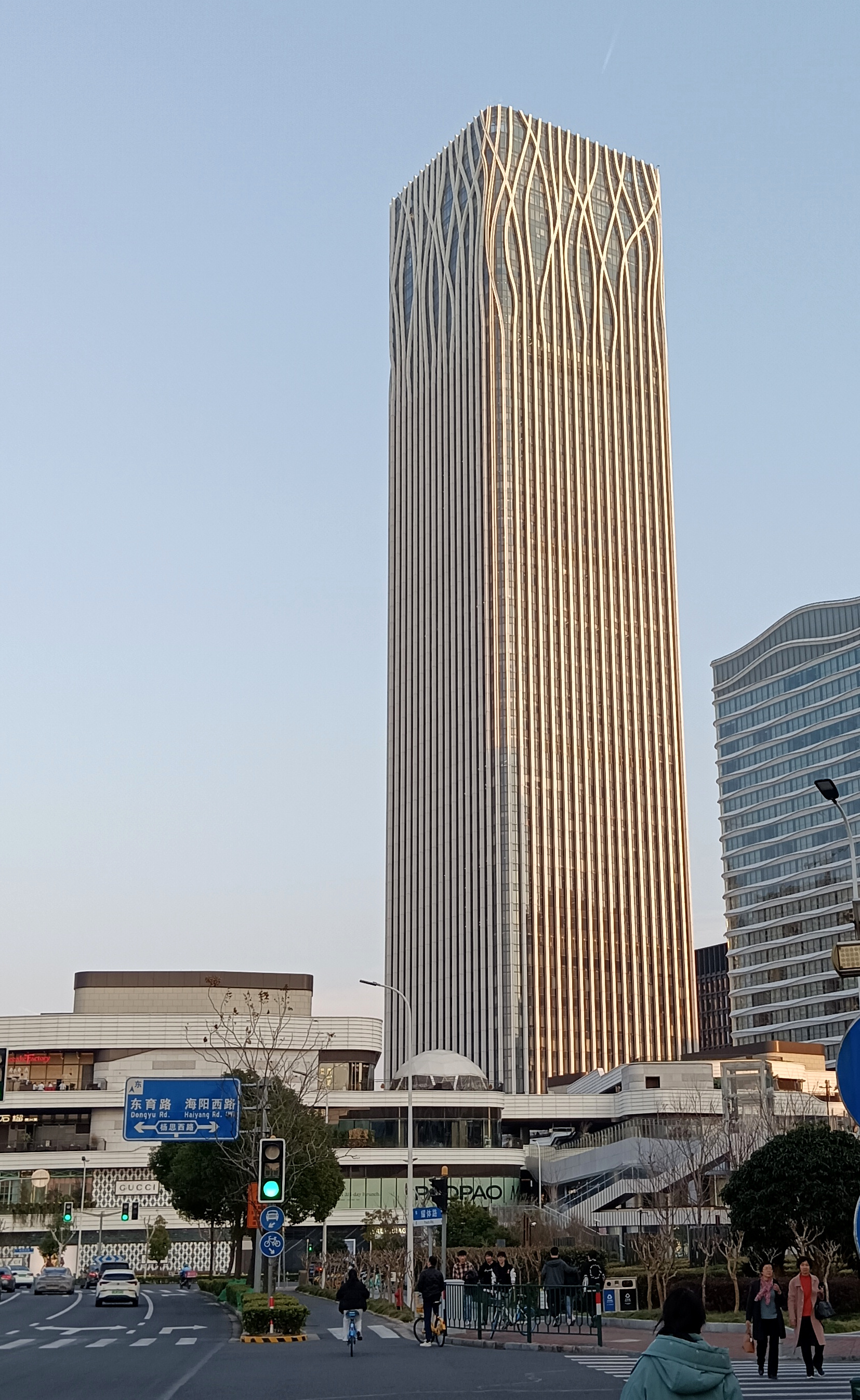
- Interactive map of the Qiantan Center area

General information
- Status: Completed
- Type: Office
- Location: Shanghai, China, 5F2J+HX2 Haiyang West Road, Pudong, Shanghai, China
- Coordinates: 31.1527°N 121.478°E
- Construction started: 2016
- Completed: 2020
- Cost: WT Partnership

Height
- Roof: 280 m (920 ft)

Technical details
- Structural system: Reinforced concrete
- Floor count: 56
- Floor area: 191,000 m^{2} (2,060,000 sq ft)

Design and construction
- Architects: Kohn Pedersen Fox (Design); Tongji Architectural Design (Group) Co., Ltd.(Record & MEP)
- Developer: Shanghai Lujiazui Development

The Qiantan Center (Chinese: 前滩中心) is an office skyscraper in the Pudong district of Shanghai, China. Built between 2016 and 2020, the tower stands at 280 m (920 ft) tall with 56 floors and is the current 9th tallest building in Shanghai.

== History ==
The building is located in the Qiantan International Business District of the Pudong New Area in Shanghai. It was developed by the Chinese company Shanghai Lujiazui Development and was designed by the American firm Kohn Pedersen Fox & Associates. The office building of Qiantan Center is the tallest building in the Qiantan area of Shanghai. It is adjacent to the third Taikoo Li project in mainland China, the Taikoo Li Qiantan commercial complex, and the five-star Shangri-La Qiantan Hotel.

=== Architecture ===
The total construction area of the Qiantan Center project is approximately 191,000 square meters, with 3 underground floors and 56 above-ground floors. The area of each floor is approximately 3,300-3,600 square meters. It is an ultra-high-rise intelligent Grade A office building. As a multi-functional development project, the Qiantan Center also has a conference center, commercial units and a fitness center.

Qiantan has become the area with the lowest vacancy rate in Pudong. As of 2022, it has attracted more than 10 international economic organizations, more than 20 industry headquarters and more than 200 Chinese and foreign companies to settle in. As of August 2024, the occupancy rate of Qiantan Center has reached 94.6%.

The office building at Qiantan Center stands as the tallest tower in Shanghai's Qiantan district, featuring vertical fins on its facade that converge at the top to form a striking organic shape, highlighting its prominence in the area. These vertical supports are arranged at three-meter intervals to reduce view blockages from the interior.

A podium links the office to the hotel, extending the "flow lines" throughout the Qiantan Center and serving as a sheltered pathway and raised bridge between the two structures. Skylights bring natural light to the lower floor and present framed perspectives of the office tower. The project, a mixed-use development, features a convention center, retail spaces, and a fitness facility. Three newly built rail lines efficiently link the center to other notable districts in Shanghai.

== See also ==
- List of tallest buildings in China
- List of tallest buildings in Shanghai
