= Shanghai North Bund Center =

- Artist's impression of Shanghai North Bund Center

General information
- Status: Under construction (Tower 1); Proposed (Tower 2 & 3)
- Type: Office, hotel, observation
- Location: Hongkou District, Puxi, Shanghai, China
- Coordinates: 31.25468°N 121.49820°E
- Construction started: March 24, 2023
- Completed: 2030
- Owner: Sinar Mas Group

Height
- Height: 480 m (1,575 ft) (tower 1); 380 m (1,247 ft) (tower 2); 300 m (984 ft) (tower 3)

Technical details
- Floor count: 97

Design and construction
- Architects: Kohn Pedersen Fox; East China Architectural Design & Research Institute
- Developer: Shanghai Industrial Urban Development Group Limited
- Engineer: Thornton Tomasetti
- Main contractor: Shanghai Construction Group

Shanghai North Bund Center (上海北外滩中心), also known as the North Bund Tower, is a 480-meter (1,570 ft) skyscraper under construction in Shanghai's Hongkou District. Designed by American architecture firm Kohn Pedersen Fox, when completed it will have 97 stories above the ground and four below ground, and will be the tallest building in Puxi.

Once completed, it will be home to the world's first urban Ritz-Carlton Reserve property.

== History ==
In May 2020, Shanghai's Hongkou District government announced a redevelopment plan for North Bund. It was also announced that a 480-meter-tall (1,570 ft) skyscraper will be built as the tallest building of the redevelopment project. Construction of the building began on March 24, 2023.

== See also ==
- List of tallest buildings in Shanghai
- Shanghai Tower
- Jin Mao Tower
- Shanghai World Financial Center
