= Shanghai SK Group Tower =

Skyscraper in Shanghai, China

- 上海SK大厦
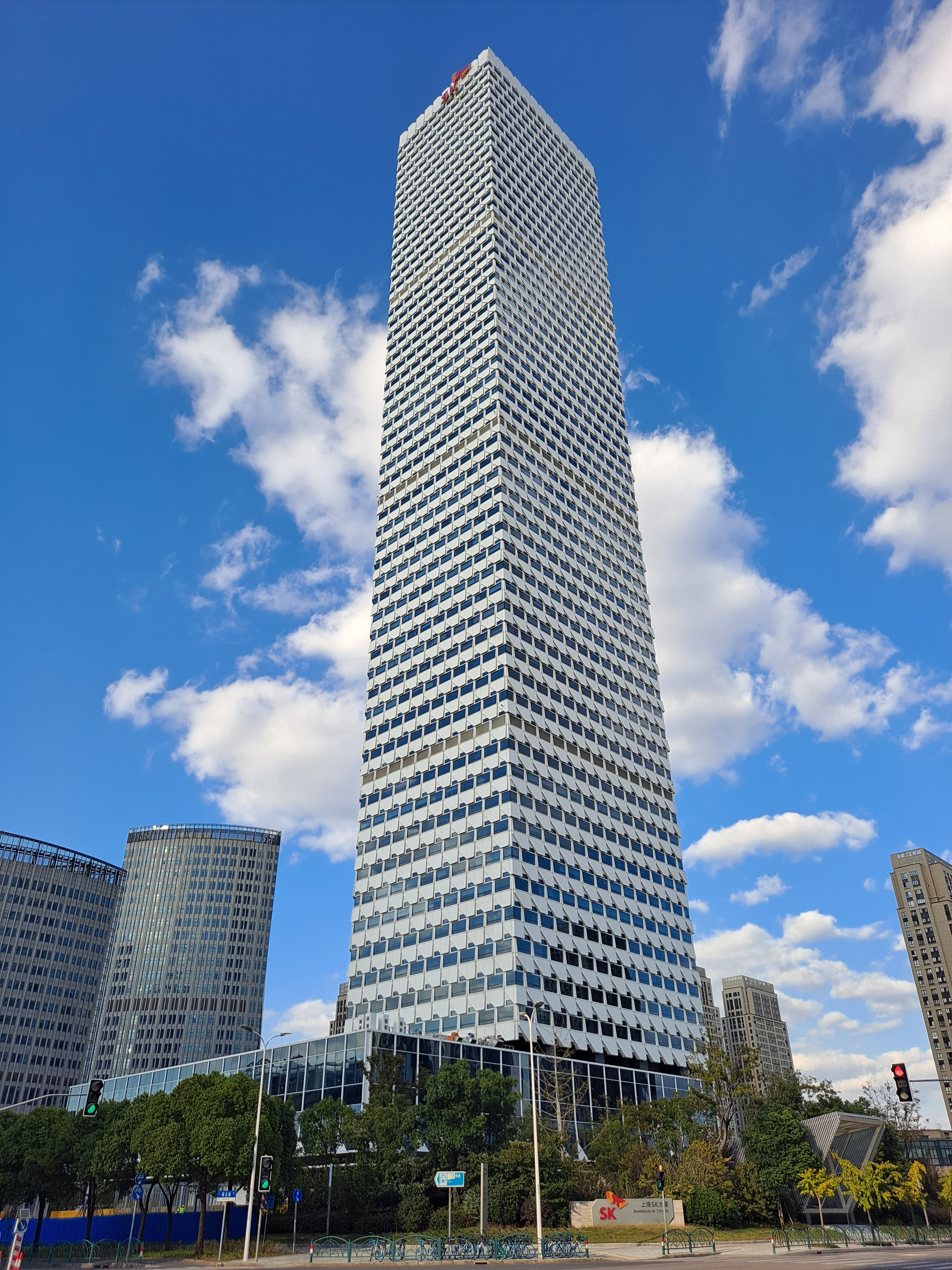

General information
- Status: Completed
- Type: Office
- Location: Shanghai, China, 330 Jiming Road, Pudong New Area, Shanghai, China
- Coordinates: 31.1724°N 121.4699°E
- Construction started: 2015
- Completed: 2019
- Cost: Rider Levett Bucknall (RLB)

Height
- Roof: 275 m (902 ft)

Technical details
- Structural system: Reinforced concrete
- Floor count: 59

Design and construction
- Architects: Arup Group (Design); Shanghai Institute of Architectural Design & Research (Record)
- Developer: SK Group
- Main contractor: Beijing Construction Engineering Group

The Shanghai SK Group Tower (Chinese: 上海SK大厦) is an office skyscraper in the Pudong district of Shanghai, China. Built between 2015 and 2019, the tower stands at 275 m (902 ft) tall with 59 floors and is the current 11th tallest building in Shanghai.

== History ==
In October 2014, the construction of Shanghai SK Tower started. In June 2021, Shanghai SK Tower was completed. The tower disposes 5A grade office quality with a 200-square-meter lobby equipped with LED screens and lighting systems provided by SK Group. The equipment stands in the cloud of approximately 2,500-square-meter freely customizable space designed for smart offices. The building provides ultra-wide viewing angle which allows a 315° panoramic view of the Huangpu River.

It is 275 meters high and has 55 floors. It is close to Houtan Station. The building is located in the area surrounded by the Yaolong Road, Yaoyuan Road, Jiming Road and Youcheng Road. The building was invested in by the South Korean technology company SK Group and designed by Shanghai's Architectural Design Institute. The building is also the location of SK Group's regional headquarters.

=== Architecture ===
The design studio RAD, based in Hong Kong and responsible for the project, chose the Timeless Marble Slimtech collection to adorn corridors across 59 floors. In the Statuario White variant, the 3m x 1m slabs shape surfaces with their modern appeal. The delicate vein designs on the pristine white base tiles foster a luminous, open ambiance in the corridors of the building, linking spaces that are often neglected.

The aesthetic merges with the principles of durability and functionality of ceramic material which is non-absorbent and resistant to stains and wear; it also aligns with eco-sustainable trends—production methods that honor the environment, minimizing the use of water, energy, and raw materials.

The building received its LEED Platinum Certification in February 2023.

== See also ==
- List of tallest buildings in Asia
- List of tallest buildings in China
- List of tallest buildings in Shanghai
