= Pudong International Information Port =

- 浦东国际信息港
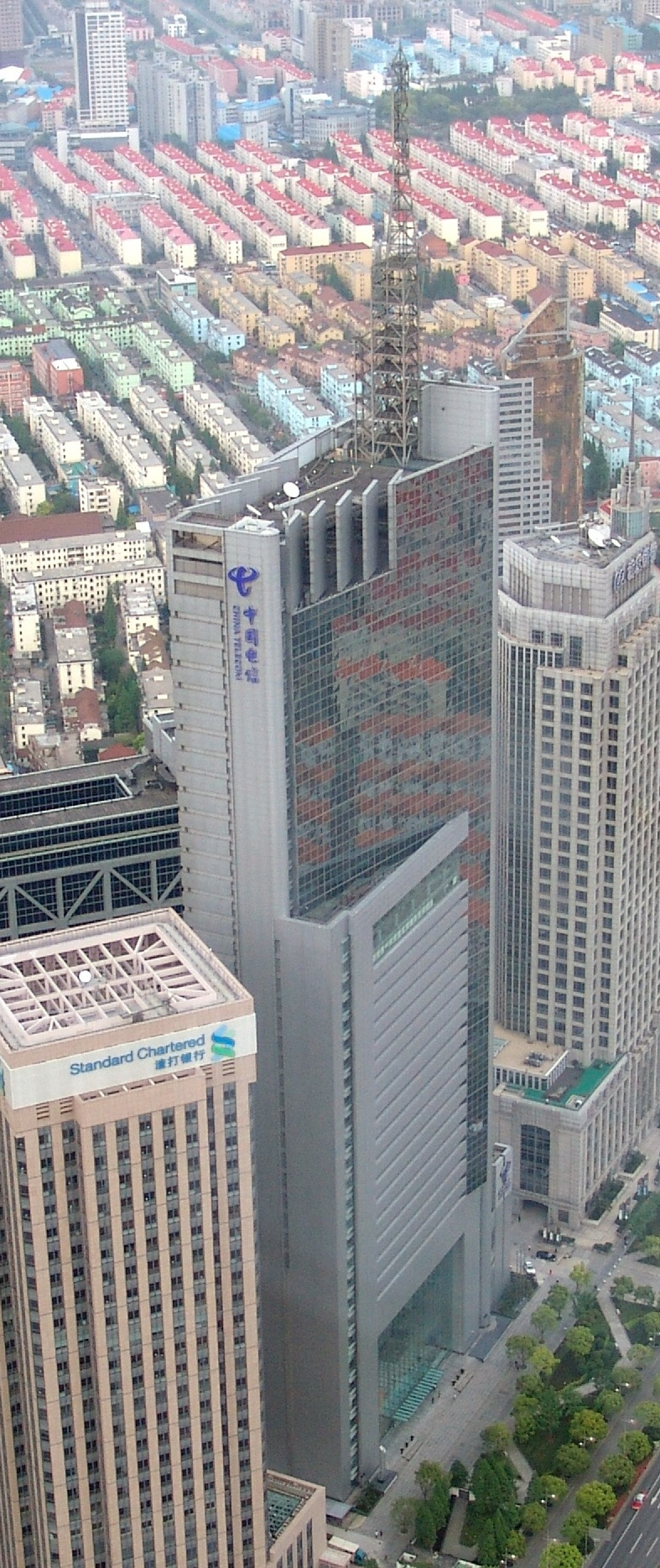
- Interactive map of the Pudong International Information Port area

General information
- Type: Office, communications, conference, restaurant
- Location: Pudong District, Shanghai, China
- Coordinates: 31.2375°N 121.5058°E
- Completed: 2001

Height
- Roof: 211 m (692 ft)

Technical details
- Floor count: 40
- Floor area: 103,442 m^{2} (1,113,440 sq ft)

Design and construction
- Architect: Nikken Sekkei Ltd.

Pudong International Information Port (Chinese: 浦东国际信息港) is a steel skyscraper in the Lujiazui financial district of Shanghai, China. It stands at 211 metres tall with 41 floors above ground and 4 floors of basement. The high-rise covers a total surface area of 103,442 m^{2}. The commercial smart building was finished in 2001. Currently, it is used for office, communication, conference, parking garage and dining purposes.

== See also ==
- List of tallest buildings in Shanghai
