= Bank of Shanghai Headquarters =

- 上海银行大厦
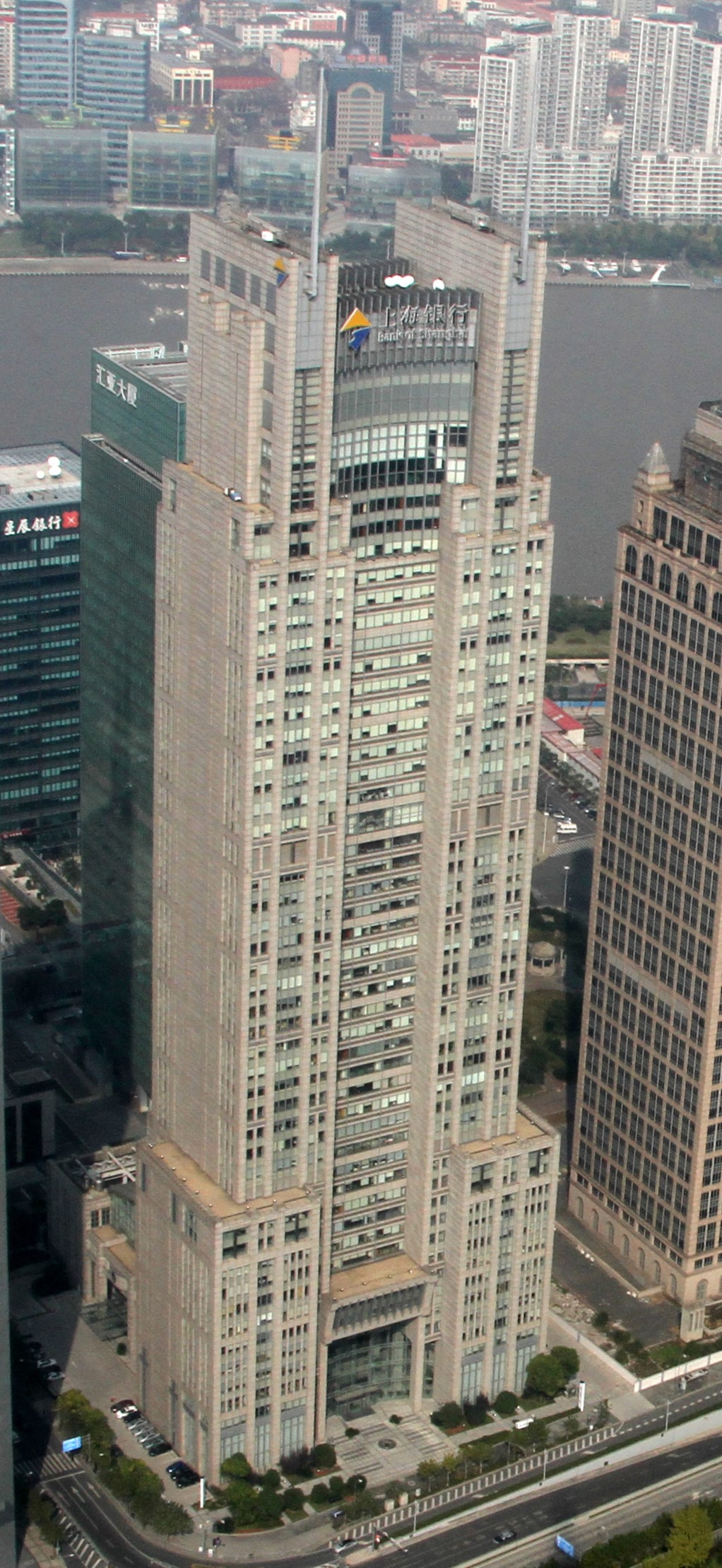
- Bank of Shanghai Headquarters in 2012
- Interactive map of the Bank of Shanghai Headquarters area

General information
- Type: Office
- Location: Pudong District, Shanghai, China
- Coordinates: 31.242°N 121.5°E
- Construction started: 2002
- Completed: 2005
- Owner: Bank of Shanghai

Height
- Antenna spire: 252 m (827 ft)
- Roof: 230 m (755 ft)

Technical details
- Floor count: 46 (+3 below-grade)
- Floor area: 107,977 m^{2} (1,162,250 sq ft)

Design and construction
- Architect: Kenzo Tange Associates
- Main contractor: Shanghai No. 1 Construction Co., Ltd.

Bank of Shanghai Headquarters (simplified Chinese: 上海银行大厦; traditional Chinese: 上海銀行大廈; pinyin: Shànghǎi Yínháng Dàshà) is a 46 floor tower in the Pudong area of Shanghai and was completed in 2005. It was built by architects Kenzo Tange Associates.

== In popular culture ==
It was one of the three buildings that were part of the filming of Mission: Impossible III starring Tom Cruise.

== See also ==
- List of tallest buildings in Shanghai
