= Shanghai International Music Fireworks Festival =

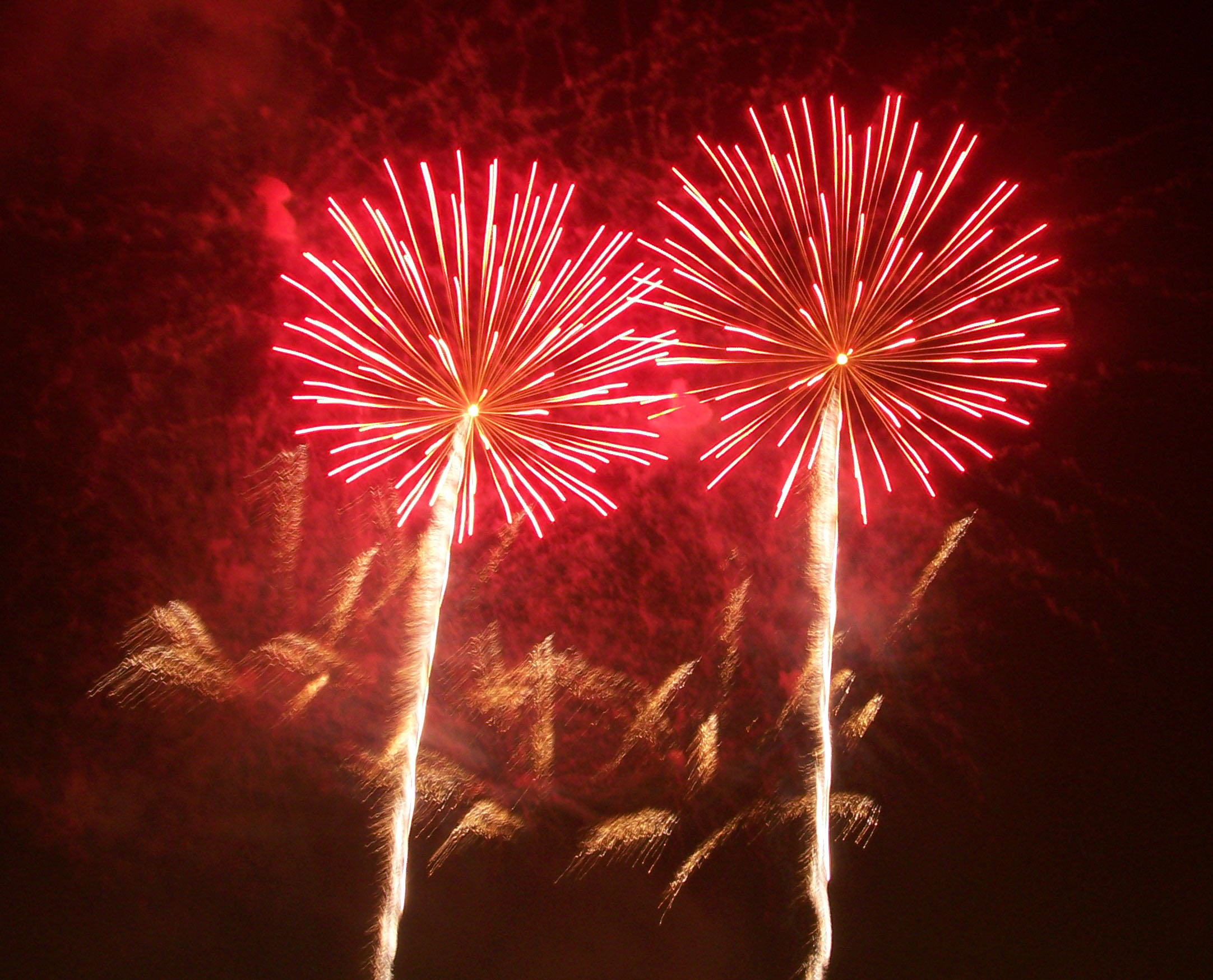
The 7th Shanghai Festival

Shanghai International Music Fireworks Festival started in 2000 and is held annually on National Day. The fireworks are fired from 7 barges and the other side of a lake in Shanghai Century Park. All fireworks are produced in China and they are designed by invited companies/designers.
