= World Finance Tower =

Building in People's Republic of China

- 世界金融大厦
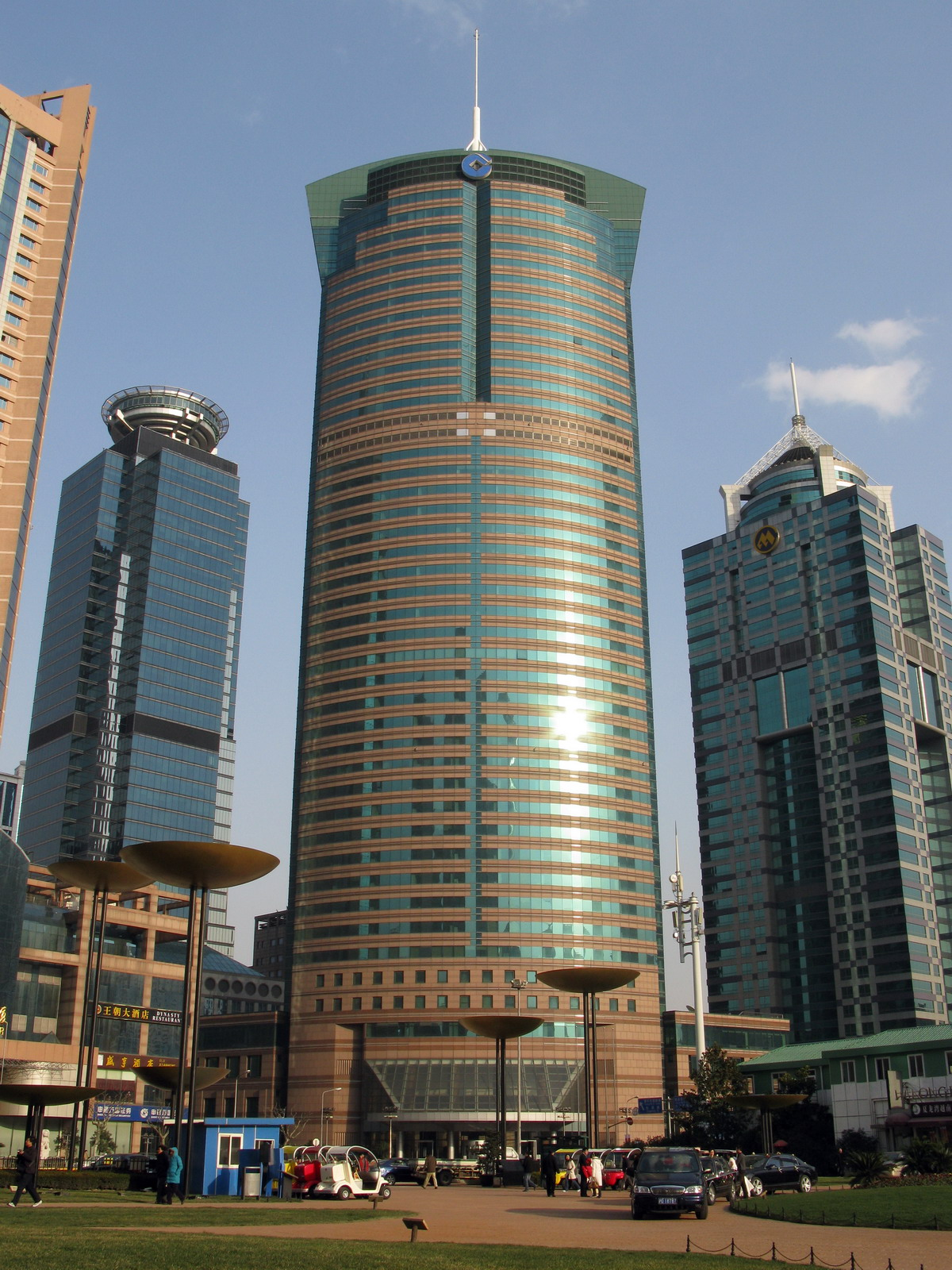
- Interactive map of the World Finance Tower area

General information
- Type: Office, restaurant
- Location: Pudong District, Shanghai, China
- Coordinates: 31.2405°N 121.504°E
- Completed: 2000

Height
- Antenna spire: 212 m (696 ft)

Technical details
- Floor count: 43
- Floor area: 87,758 m^{2} (944,620 sq ft)

Design and construction
- Architect: Leigh & Orange Ltd.
- Structural engineer: Magnusson Klemencic Associates

The World Finance Tower (Chinese: 世界金融大厦) is a 43 floor tower in the Pudong area of Shanghai and was completed in 2000. It was designed by architects Leigh & Orange.

== See also ==
- List of tallest buildings in Shanghai
