= Bank of China Tower, Shanghai =

Skyscraper in Shanghai, China

Bank of China Tower
- 中银大厦
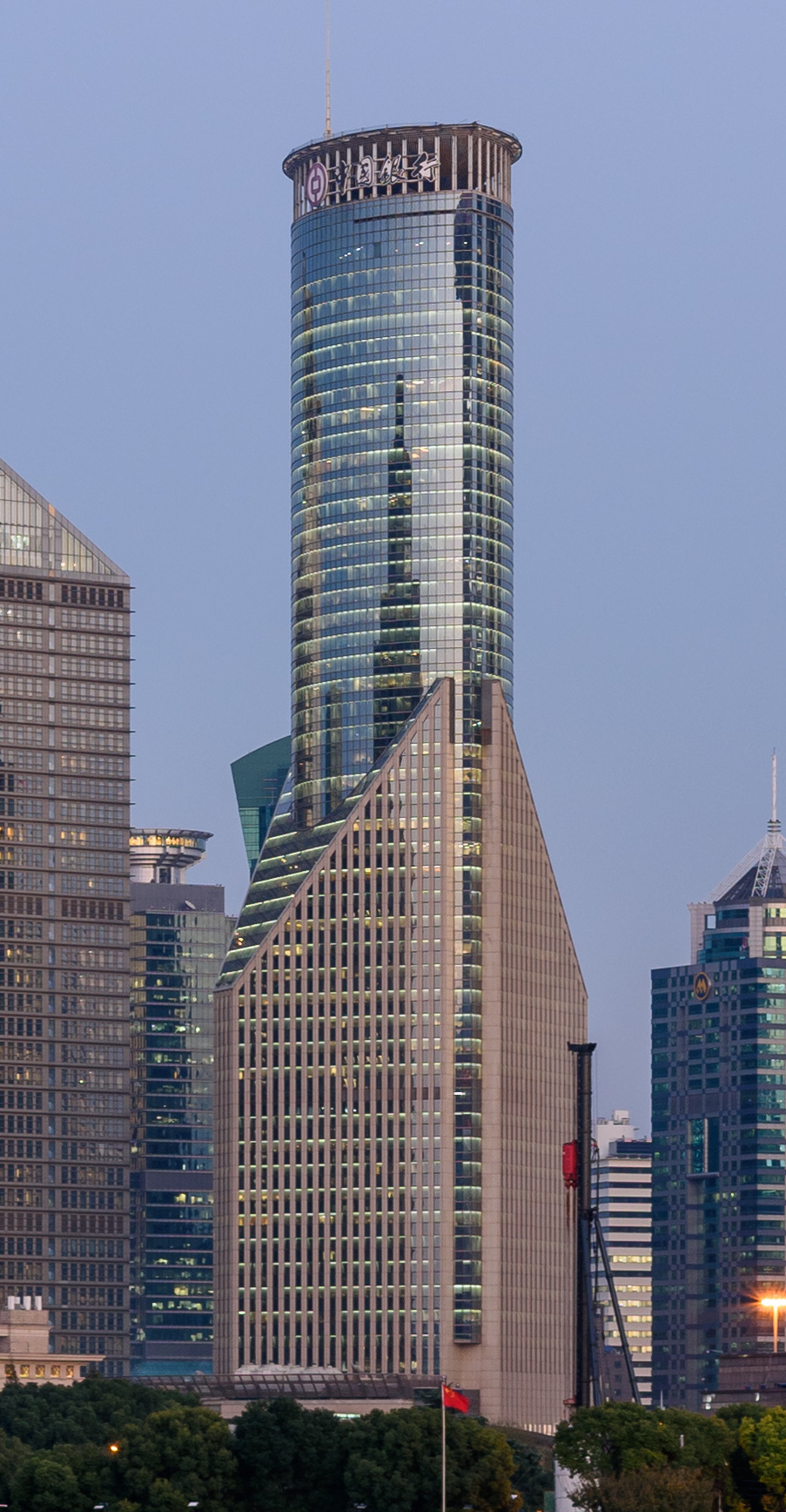
- Bank of China Tower taken from The Bund in 2017
- Interactive map of the Bank of China Tower area

General information
- Status: Completed
- Type: Office
- Location: 200 Yincheng Middle Road, Pudong District, Shanghai, China
- Coordinates: 31.2405°N 121.4985°E
- Completed: 1999
- Opening: 28 August 2000
- Cost: 230 million USD

Height
- Antenna spire: 258 m (846 ft)
- Roof: 226 m (741 ft)

Technical details
- Floor count: 53 (plus 3 underground）
- Floor area: 124,444 m^{2} (1,339,500 sq ft)

Design and construction
- Architect: Nikken Sekkei Ltd.

The Shanghai Bank of China Tower (simplified Chinese: 上海中银大厦; traditional Chinese: 上海中銀大廈; pinyin: Shànghǎi Zhōngyín Dàshà) is a 53-story tower in the Pudong District, Shanghai, China. It was built for the Bank of China by the Japanese architectural firm Nikken Sekkei.

== In popular culture ==
It was one of the three buildings that were part of the filming of Mission: Impossible III starring Tom Cruise. It is the building where Tom Cruise did a bungee jump.

== See also ==
- List of tallest buildings in Shanghai
