= Oasis Skyway Garden Hotel =

Skyscraper hotel in Luwan District, Shanghai, China

Oasis Skyway Garden
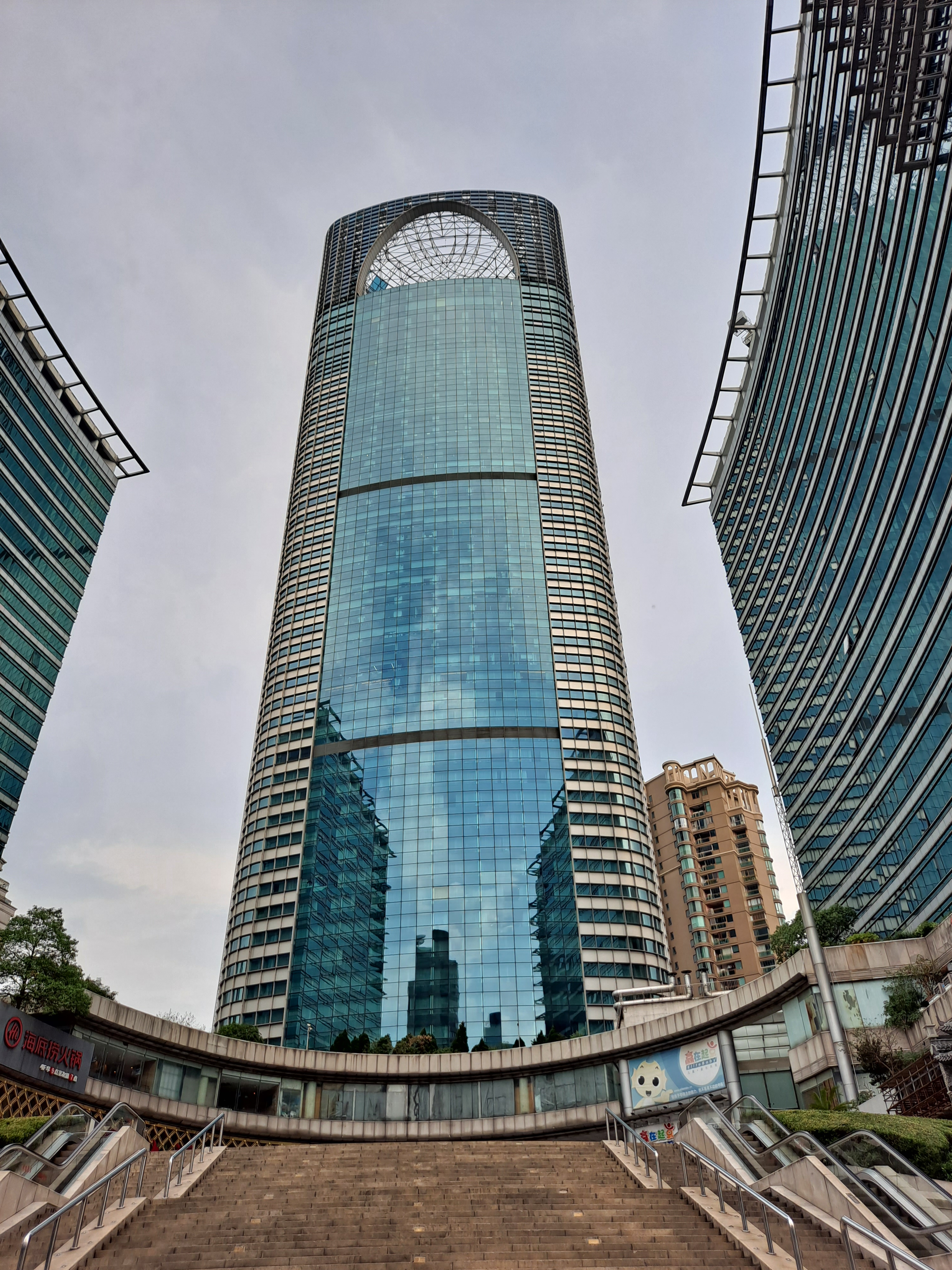
- The main tower of the Golden Magnolia Plaza
- Interactive map of the Oasis Skyway Garden area

General information
- Type: Pullman Shanghai Skyway Hotel, residential
- Location: Luwan District, Shanghai, China
- Coordinates: 31.206379°N 121.466214°E
- Construction started: 2005
- Completed: 2007

Height
- Roof: 226 m (741 ft)

Technical details
- Floor count: 52
- Floor area: 97,000 m^{2} (1,040,000 sq ft)

Design and construction
- Architects: Bregman + Hamann Architects, Arte Charpentier et associés

Oasis Skyway Garden Hotel is a skyscraper located at 15 Dapu Road, Luwan, Shanghai, 200023, China. It is 226 m high, has 52 stories and was completed in 2007. It contains 454 hotel rooms and 239 serviced apartments. It is now home to the Pullman Shanghai Skyway Hotel.

== See also ==
- List of tallest buildings in Shanghai
