= Shanghai Wheelock Square =

Coordinates: 31°13′25″N 121°26′25″E

- 会德丰国际广场
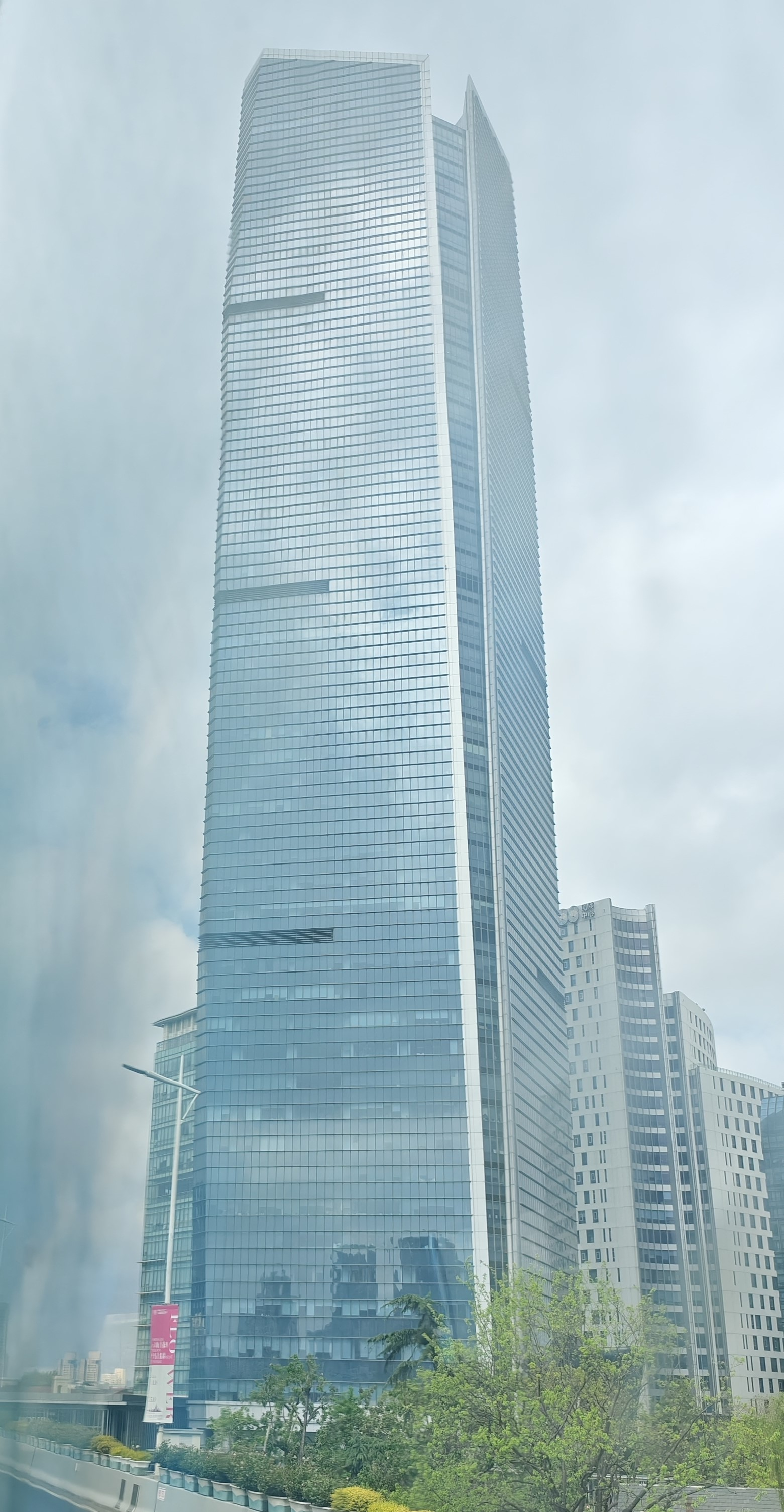
- Shanghai Wheelock Square in 2026
- Interactive map of the Shanghai Wheelock Square area

General information
- Status: Completed
- Type: Office
- Location: Nanjing Road West/Huasha Road, Puxi, Shanghai, China
- Construction started: 2003
- Completed: 2010

Height
- Roof: 887 ft (270 m)

Technical details
- Floor count: 59
- Floor area: 1,227,893 sq ft (114,075.0 m^{2})

Design and construction
- Architect: Kohn Pedersen Fox Associates PC
- Developer: The (Wharf) Holdings Limited

Shanghai Wheelock Square is a skyscraper located in Puxi, Shanghai, China. It is the sixth-tallest building in Shanghai.

The Wheelock Square building has 58 floors, and just over 100,000 m^{2} (1,100,000 sq ft) of prime office space. It is located across the street from the Jing'an Temple Station on Shanghai Metro Lines 2, 7, and 14.

== Awards and honors ==
- CTBUH, Best Tall Building Asian & Australia, Nominee (2011)
- International Property Awards: Asia, Highly Commended High Rise Award (2013)
- MIPIM Asia, Business Centres, Bronze (2011)
- Quality Building, Non-Residential Category, Finalist (2012)

== See also ==
- List of tallest buildings in Shanghai
