= Raffles City Shanghai =

- 上海来福士广场
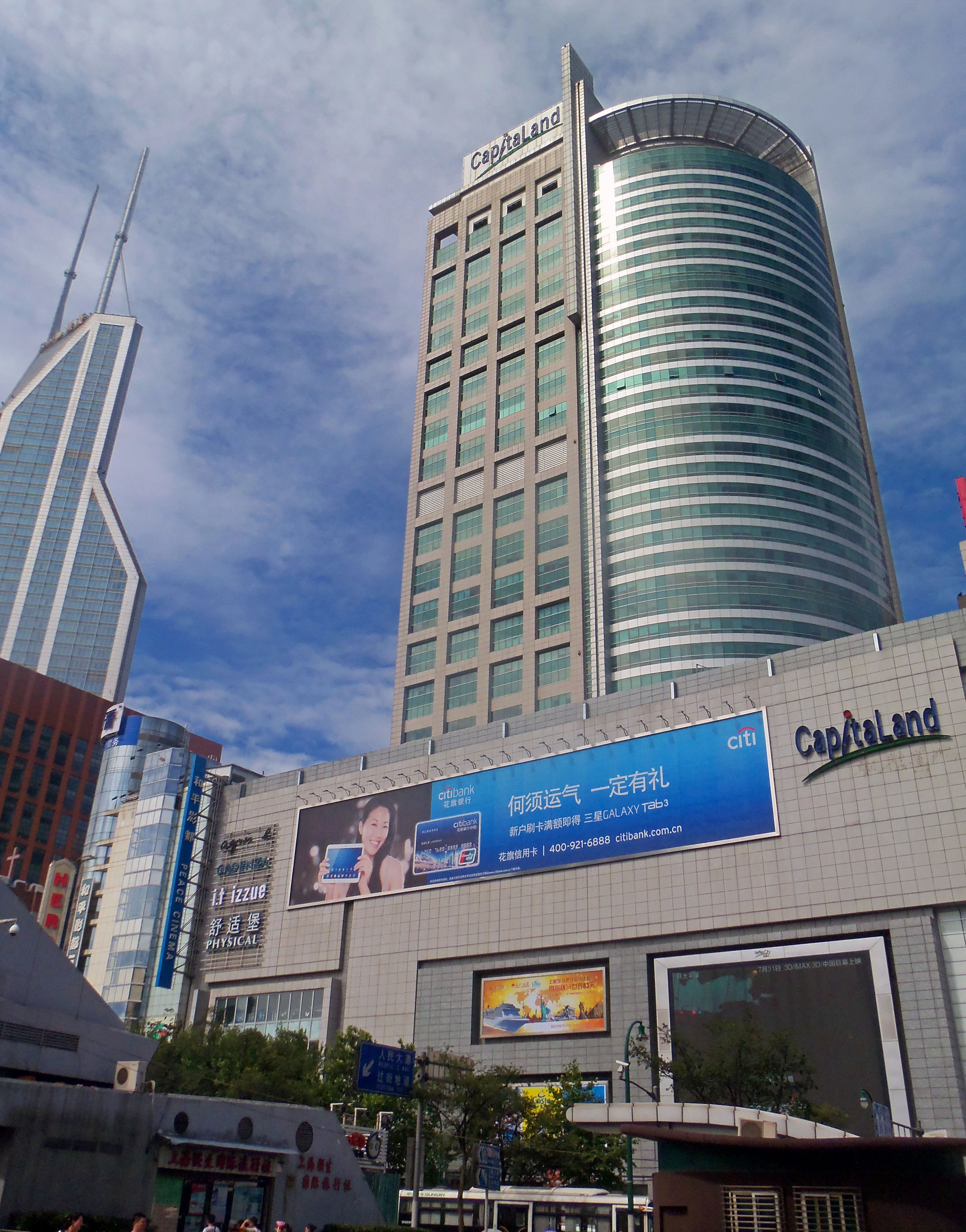
- Raffles City mall and tower from across Middle Xizang Road, 2013
- Interactive map of the Raffles City Shanghai area

General information
- Type: Office, retail
- Location: Huangpu District, Shanghai, China
- Coordinates: 31.2345°N 121.472°E
- Completed: 2003
- Operator: CapitaLand

Height
- Roof: 222 m (728 ft)

Technical details
- Floor count: 49
- Floor area: 87,000 m^{2} (940,000 sq ft)

Design and construction
- Architects: P & T Architects & Engineers Ltd.

Raffles City Shanghai (Chinese: 上海来福士广场) is a skyscraper in Shanghai, China, developed by CapitaLand of Singapore. It is 222 m high, has 49 stories and was completed in 2003. Its base contains a shopping mall, with the tower devoted to office space. A news report in 2021, reported that Ping An unit will acquire stakes in six Raffles City properties, including the Raffles City Shanghai.

== See also ==
- List of tallest buildings in Shanghai
