= One Lujiazui =

- 时代金融中心
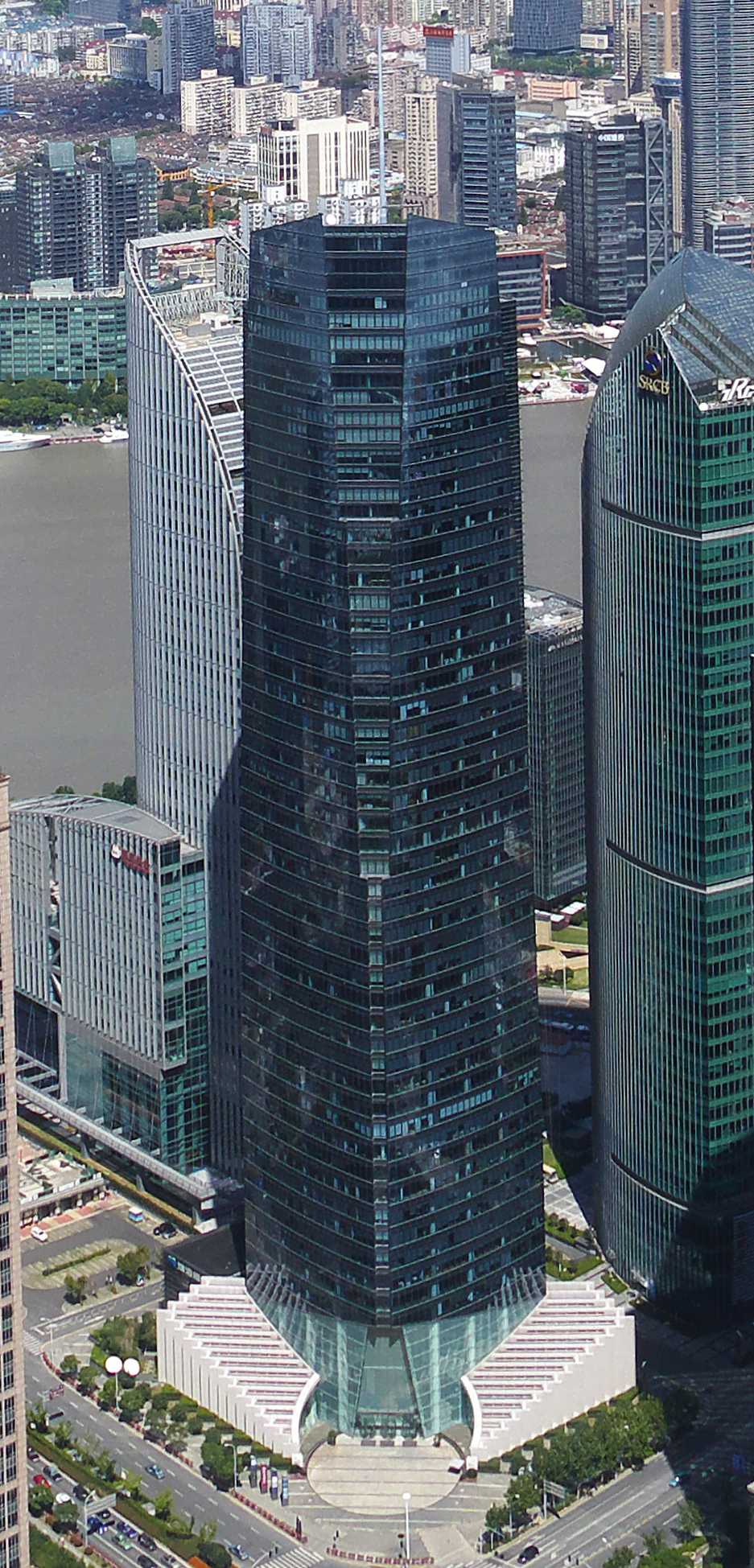
- Interactive map of the One Lujiazui area

General information
- Type: Mixed-use: Office, Residential
- Location: Pudong New District, Shanghai, China
- Coordinates: 31.243329°N 121.50189°E
- Construction started: 2004
- Completed: 2008
- Owner: Shanghai Development Real Estate Co., Ltd.

Height
- Antenna spire: 269 m (883 ft)
- Roof: 239 m (784 ft)

Technical details
- Floor count: 57
- Floor area: 110,000 m^{2} (1,200,000 sq ft)

Design and construction
- Architect: Nikken Sekkei Ltd

One Lujiazui, previously known as Development Tower, is a mixed-use skyscraper in Shanghai, China. It is the 9th tallest building in Shanghai. Finished in 2008, the tower stands 269 metres tall. The glass highrise's primary use is as an office building, though it also offers over 6,000 square metres of residential space. One Lujiazui is located near the Lujiazui Central Park, by the Huangpu River.

== Designer ==
Design Architect : Tomohiko Yamanashi / NIKKEN SEKKEI (Japan)

== See also ==
- List of tallest buildings in Shanghai
