= King Tower =

Skyscraper in Shanghai, China

- 新金桥大厦
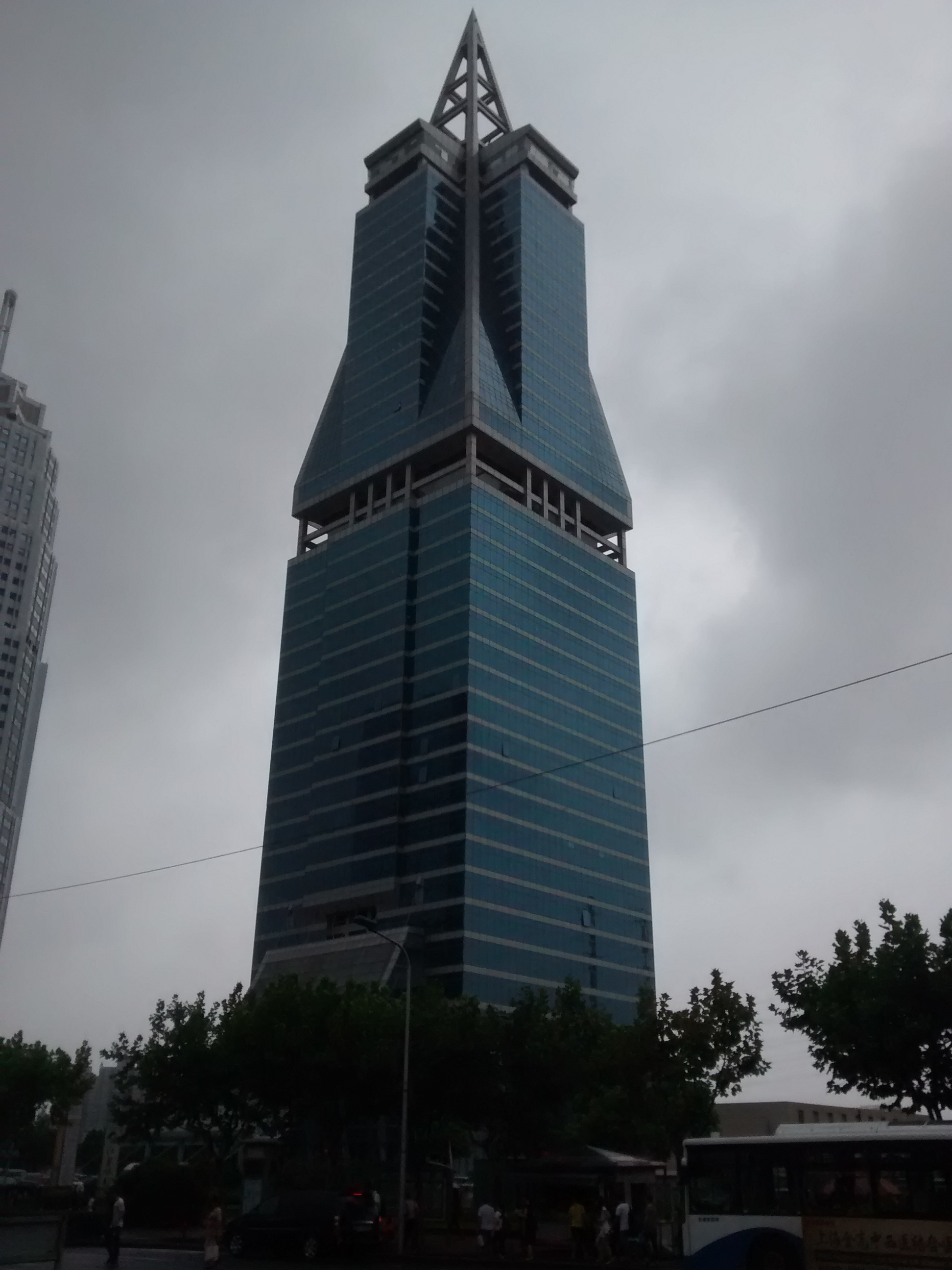
- Interactive map of the King Tower area

General information
- Type: Office
- Location: Pudong District, Shanghai, China
- Coordinates: 31.2479°N 121.587°E
- Completed: 1996

Height
- Antenna spire: 212 m (696 ft)
- Roof: 172 m (564 ft)

Technical details
- Floor count: 38

Design and construction
- Architect: TaoHo Design Architects

King Tower (simplified Chinese: 新金桥大厦; traditional Chinese: 新金橋大廈; pinyin: Xīnjīnqiáo Dàshà) is a skyscraper in Shanghai, China. It is 212 m tall, has 38 stories and was completed in 1996.

The tower was the tallest in China until Shun Hing Square in Shenzhen was built later in the same year. It was the tallest building in Shanghai until the Jin Mao Tower's completion in 1998.

== See also ==
- List of tallest buildings in Shanghai

Records
Preceded by China Merchants Tower	Tallest Building in Shanghai; 1996 – 1998	Succeeded by Jin Mao Tower
