= International Ocean Shipping Building =

- 国际航运金融大厦
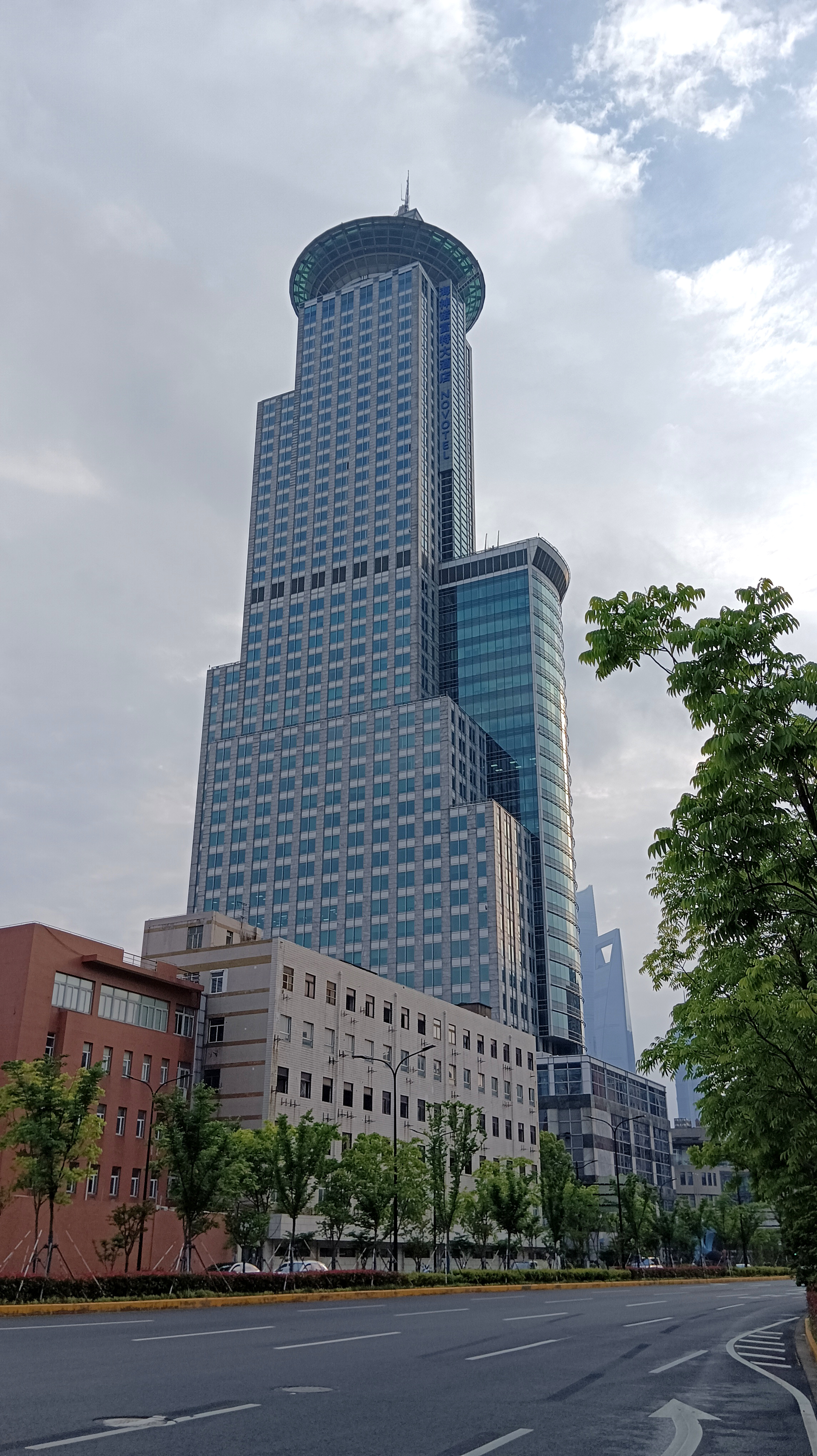
- Interactive map of the International Ocean Shipping Building area

General information
- Type: Office, hotel, retail, restaurant
- Location: Pudong District, Shanghai, China
- Coordinates: 31.242°N 121.5205°E
- Completed: 2000

Height
- Antenna spire: 232 m (761 ft)
- Roof: 208 m (682 ft)
- Top floor: 200 m (656 ft)

Technical details
- Floor count: 50
- Floor area: 125,000 m^{2} (1,350,000 sq ft)

Design and construction
- Architects: East China Architectural Design & Research Institute Co. Ltd., Joseph Bogdan Associates, Inc.

The International Ocean Shipping Building (Chinese: 国际航运金融大厦) is a 50-floor, 232-metre (761 ft) tall skyscraper completed in 2000 located in Shanghai, China. It was designed by East China Architectural Design & Research Institute and Joseph Bogdan Associates. It has a total floor area of 125,000 square metres (1,350,000 square feet).

Part of the building is occupied by the Novotel Atlantis Pudong Shanghai hotel, with 303 guest rooms. The 50th floor is home to a revolving restaurant.

== See also ==
- List of tallest buildings in Shanghai
