= Shanghai Futures Building =

Office building in Shanghai, China

Coordinates: 31.227886°N 121.530432°E

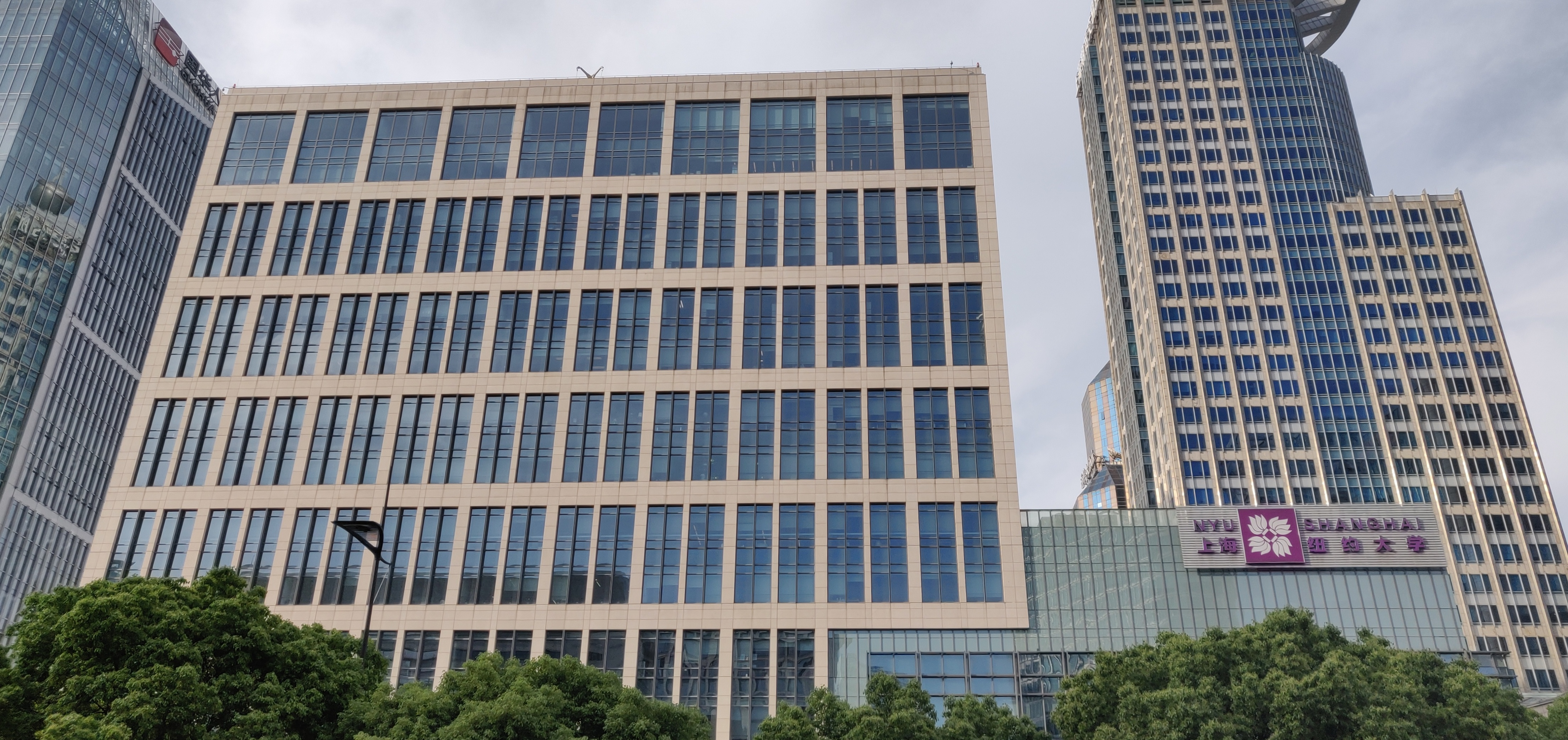
- The building to the right is the Shanghai Futures Building
- Interactive map of the Shanghai Futures Building area

General information
- Status: Completed
- Location: 500 Pu Dian Road, Shanghai, China
- Completed: 1998

Height
- Height: 614 ft (187 m)

Technical details
- Floor count: 37 (+3 below-grade)
- Floor area: 768,027 sq ft (71,352.0 m^{2})

The Shanghai Futures Building is a 37 floor tower in the Pudong area of Shanghai that was completed in 1998. It was designed by architect Langdon Wilson.
