= Jin Jiang Tower =

Hotel in Shanghai, China

Coordinates: 31°13′20″N 121°27′30″E

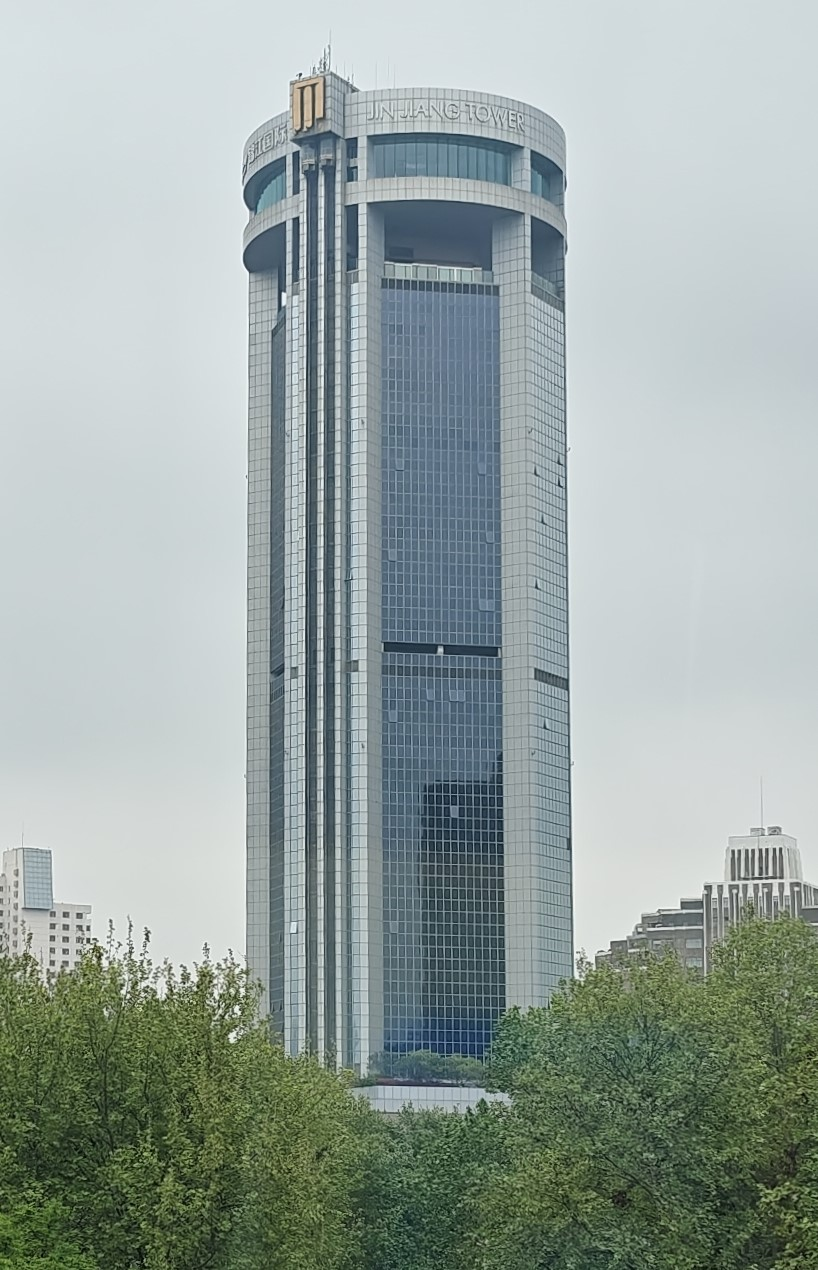
Jin Jiang Tower in 2026

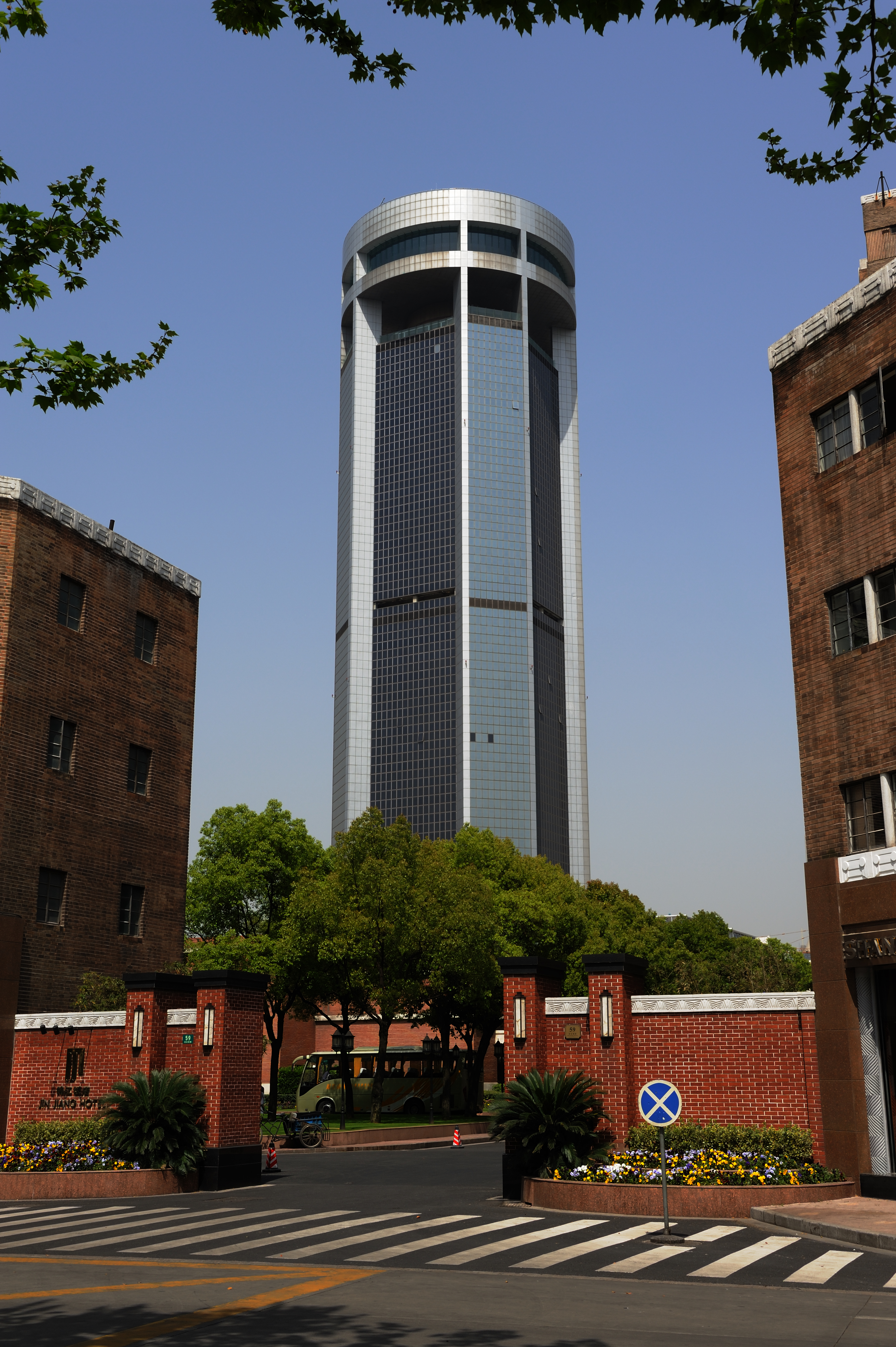
Jin Jiang Tower Hotel, Shanghai.

Jin Jiang Tower (上海新锦江大酒店; lit. 'Shanghai New Jinjiang Hotel') is a 43-floor hotel in Shanghai, China. The hotel is owned and operated by Shanghai Jinjiang Capital Co., Ltd., a subsidiary company of Jin Jiang International Co., Ltd.

It was the tallest building in Shanghai from its completion in 1988, to the construction of the Oriental Pearl Tower in 1994.

== See also ==
- Shanghai Jinjiang Hotel (1934)

Preceded by Union Friendship Tower	Tallest Building in Shanghai; 1988–1990	Succeeded by The Portman Ritz-Carlton
