= List of tallest buildings in Shanghai =

Tall buildings in Shanghai
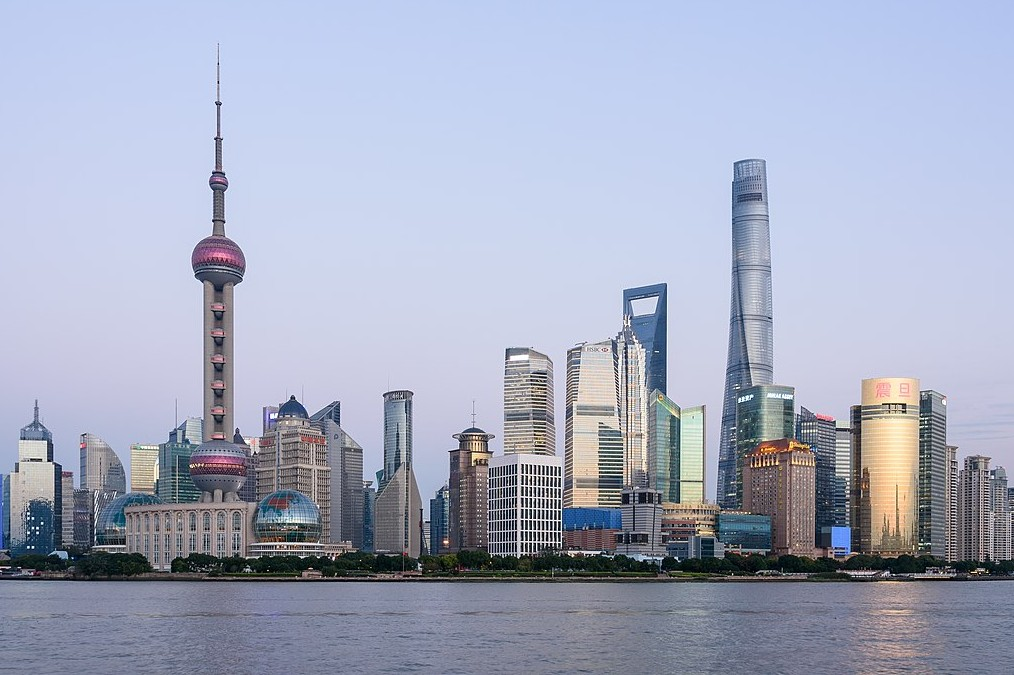
- The skyline of Lujiazui in Pudong District, with the Oriental Pearl Tower, Jin Mao Tower, Shanghai World Financial Center and Shanghai Tower
- Tallest building: Shanghai Tower (2015)
- Tallest building height: 632 m (2,073 ft) (3rd)
- First 150 m+ building: Jin Jiang Tower (1988)

Number of tall buildings
- Taller than 150 m (492 ft): 206 (2026) (6th)
- Taller than 200 m (656 ft): 76 (2026) (6th)
- Taller than 300 m (984 ft): 9 (2026) (5th)
- Taller than 400 m (1,312 ft): 3

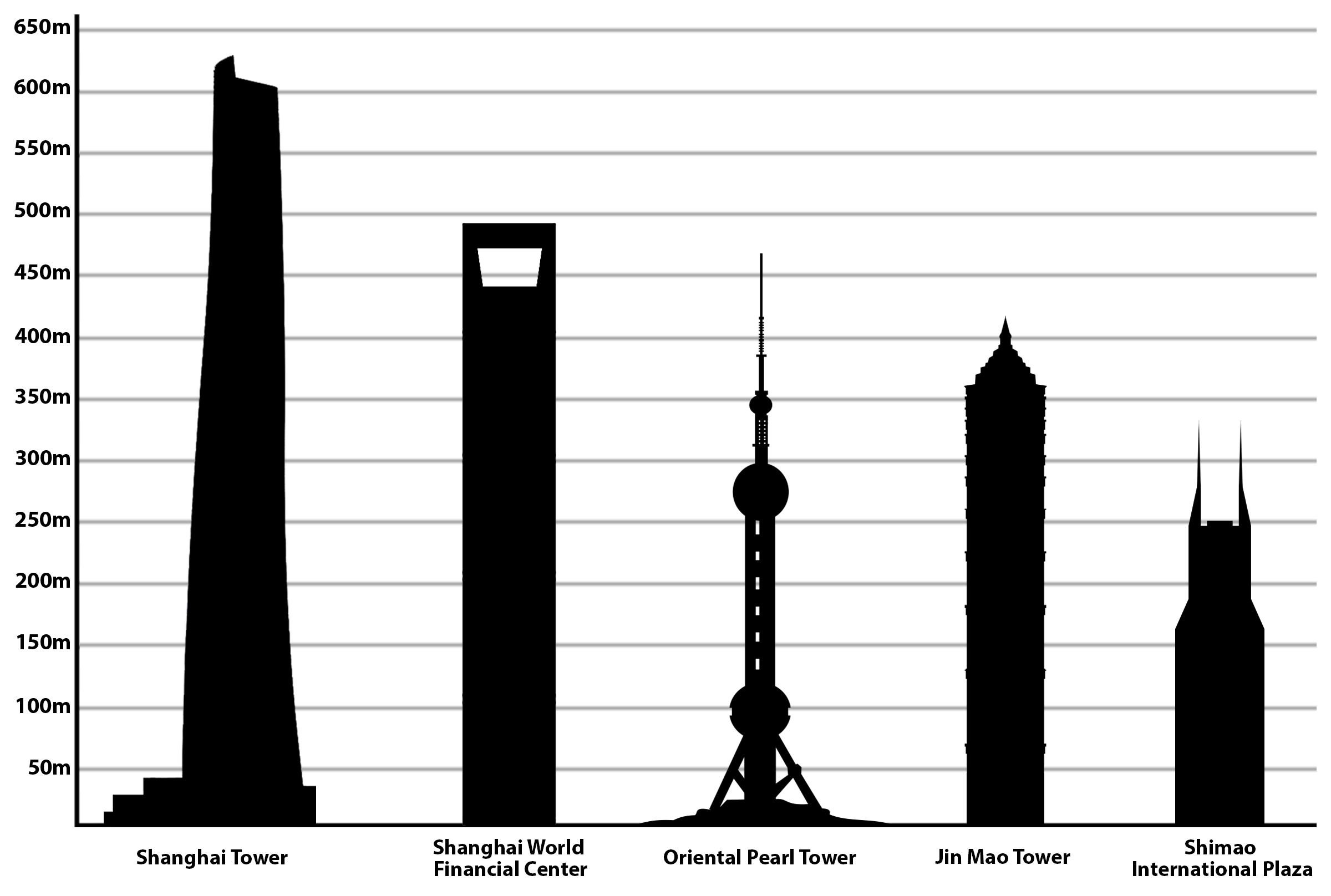
Tallest structures in Shanghai.

The city of Shanghai, China has one of the largest skylines in the world, with 193 completed skyscrapers that reach a height of 150 metres (492 feet) as of 2026, making it the city with the sixth-most skyscrapers in the world. It also has the third most skyscrapers in mainland China, after Shenzhen and Guangzhou. As the largest urban area in China, with an urban area population of over 21.9 million residents as of 2020, Shanghai is home to some of China's tallest buildings.

Shanghai's first high-rise building boom occurred in the 1920s and 1930s, during the city's heyday as a multinational center of business and finance. The city's international concessions permitted foreign investment, and with it came architectural styles influenced by the West, as seen today in areas such as the French Concession and the Bund. After the Communist takeover in 1949, Shanghai's urban development was stifled, punished for its earlier capitalist excesses.

Following economic reforms in the late 1980s, Shanghai became one of the first Chinese cities to build skyscrapers. The area of Lujiazui, in the district of Pudong, was designated as a new central business district (CBD), and gradually became the focal point of the skyline. From the late 1990s, skyscrapers began to be built at a rapid pace. The City of Shanghai reported in 2004 that 6,704 buildings of 11 stories or more were completed since 1990; by 2011, there are over 20,000 buildings at least 11 stories tall and more than 1,000 buildings exceeding 30 stories in Shanghai.

Lujiazui forms the central portion of Shanghai's skyline, and contains its three tallest buildings. The third tallest, the postmodern Jin Mao Tower, was China's first supertall skyscraper. It was the tallest building in Shanghai from 1990 until 2008, when Shanghai World Financial Center was completed. Since 2015, the tallest building in Shanghai has been the 632 m (2,073 ft) tall, 128-story Shanghai Tower, one of only four megatall skyscrapers. At the time of its completion, it was the second-tallest building in the world; it is currently the third tallest. While not a habitable building, the Oriental Pearl Tower, also in Lujiazui, has been a significant landmark in the skyline since its completion in 1994. Besides Lujiazui, many skyscrapers are found throughout the central areas of Shanghai, such as in Huangpu, Hongkou, and Xuhui.

Shanghai has seven supertall skyscrapers, and is tied with Chicago, Nanjing, and Wuhan as the city with the fifth-most supertall buildings. Since the 2010s, an increasing number of supertall skyscrapers have been built outside of Lujiazui, such as Sinar Mas Center 1 to the north of the Bund in 2017 and the Zhangjiang Science Gate towers in 2024; the latter are the tallest twin towers in Shanghai. Four more supertall skyscrapers are under construction, all located outside of Lujiazui; the tallest of these, North Bund Tower, will reach a height of 480 m (1,575 ft) and be the city's third tallest building upon completion in 2030.

== Tallest buildings ==
This list ranks skyscrapers in Shanghai that stand at least 200 m (660 ft) tall, based on standard height measurement. This includes spires and architectural details but does not include antenna masts. An equals sign (=) following a rank indicates the same height between two or more buildings. The "Year" column indicates the year in which a building was completed.

Was the tallest building in Shanghai upon completion

Rank	Name	Image	Height		Floors	Year Completed	Notes
Rank	Name	Image	m	ft	Floors	Year Completed	Notes
1	Shanghai Tower		632	2073	128	2015	Tallest building in China; 3rd tallest building in the world; Tallest twisted building in the world (total rotation – 120°); Houses the J hotel
2	Shanghai World Financial Center		492	1614	101	2008	Tallest building in the world with a hole; Houses Park Hyatt Shanghai.
3	Jin Mao Tower		421	1380	88	1999	Houses a Grand Hyatt hotel
4	Xujiahui Center Tower 1		370	1214	70	2025	
5	Shimao International Plaza		333	1094	60	2006	Has a Conrad Hotel as of 2022
6	Sinar Mas Center		320	1050	67	2017	Also known as White Magnolia Plaza
7=	Zhangjiagang Science Gate Tower 1		320	1049	60	2024	
7=	Zhangjiagang Science Gate Tower 2		320	1049	60	2024	
9	Plaza 66 (Tower 1)		288	945	66	2001	
10	Lumina Shanghai		286	935	61	2021	
10=	Zhenru Center		285	935	53	2023	
10=	Axiom One		285	935	50	2023	
13	Tomorrow Square		285	934	55	2003	Has a JW Marriott hotel
14	Qiantan Center		280	919	56	2020	
15	Hong Kong New World Tower		278	913	50	2004	Now known as K11
16	Shanghai SK Group Tower		275	902	59	2019	
17	Shanghai Wheelock Square		271	887	58	2010	
18	One Lujiazui		269	883	47	2008	
19=	Raffles City The Bund East Tower		263	863	50	2018	Also known as Star Harbor International Center East Tower
19=	Raffles City The Bund West Tower		263	863	50	2018	Also known as Star Harbor International Center West Tower
21	66 Tower 1		262	860	54	2005	Also known as Grand Gateway Tower 1
22	66 Tower 2		262	860	54	2005	Also known as Grand Gateway Tower 2
23=	Jing An Kerry Centre Tower 2		260	853	58	2013	
23=	Shanghai IFC North Tower		260	853	56	2010	Also known as Two IFC or HSBC Building
25	CITIC Ruibo Tower 1		256	840	55	2017	
26	Bank of Shanghai Headquarters		252	827	46	2005	
27=	Pacific New World Tower 1		250	820	49	2024	
27=	Shanghai IFC South Tower		250	820	48	2009	Contains a Ritz-Carlton hotel
27=	HKRI Centre One		250	820	51	2016	
30	One Museum Place		249	816	54	2018	
31	Jinqiao One Center		248	814	46	2025	
32	Global Harbor North Tower		245	804	45	2014	
33	Global Harbor South Tower		245	804	45	2014	
34	Maxdo Centre		241	792	55	2002	
35	Greenland Bund Center Tower 3		240	787	45	2022	
36=	Cloud Nine		238	781	60	2006	Also known as Longemont, Cloud Nine Shopping Mall or Shanghai Summit Shopping City contains Renaissance Shanghai Zhongshan Park Hotel
36=	CITIC Ruibo Tower 2		238	781	52	2017	
38	Huamin Emperor Hotel		235	846	60	2013	
39	AI W Tower		235	771	56	2020	Also known as West Bund International AI Towers and Plaza Tower 1
40	International Ocean Shipping Building		232	762	50	2000	
41	BOCOM Financial Towers		230	756	50	1999	
42	Zhenru Zhonghai Center Tower 1		230	755	47	2024	
43=	CITIC Plaza		228	749	47	2010	
45	Pullman Shanghai Skyway Hotel		226	742	52	2007	Also known as Oasis Skyway Garden Hotel
46	Bank of China Tower		226	741	53	2000	
47	Raffles Square Tower		222	728	49	2003	
48=	Zhongrong Jasper Tower		220	722	48	2008	
48=	Shanghai International Trade Center Tower 1		220	722	40	2022	
50	The Longemont Shanghai		218	715	53	2005	Also known as the Regent Shanghai
51	Shanghai Dong Hai Plaza (The Exchange–SOHO)		217	712	52	2004	
52=	Riviera TwinStar Square 1		216	708	49	2010	
52=	Riviera TwinStar Square 2		216	708	49	2010	
54	Shanghai Financial Exchange Plaza Tower 1		215	705	32	2020	
55=	World Finance Tower		212	696	43	1997	
55=	King Tower		212	696	38	1996	Also known as Xinjinqiao Mansion
57	Pudong International Information Port		211	692	40	2001	
58	No.1 Shanghai		211	691	34	2016	
59	21st Century Mansion*		210	689	49	2009	
60=	Radisson Blu Hotel Shanghai New World		208	682	46	2005	
60=	Taiping Financial Tower		208	682	38	2011	
60=	China Merchants Bank Mansion		208	682	37	2011	
63	Golden Bell Mansion		208	656	46	1998	
64	DoubleTree by Hilton Hotel Shanghai–Pudong		207	679	47	2002	
65	Golden Landmark		206	676	41	2008	
66=	Nan Zheng Building		205	673	49	1998	
66=	Suhe Center		205	673	42	2022	
68	Lippo Plaza		204	669	38	1998	
69	Hang Seng Bank Tower		203	667	46	1998	
70	BM Plaza Office Tower		203	666	50	2009	
71	Zhenru Zhonghai Center Tower 2		200	657	39	2024	
72	COFCO Shanghai Joy City Phase 2		200	656	42	2021	

== Tallest under construction ==
There are twelve skyscrapers that are under construction in Shanghai that are expected to be at least 200 m (656 ft) tall as of 2026, based on standard height measurement.

Name	Estimated height m / feet	Estimated floors	Estimated year of completion*	Notes
North Bund Tower	480 / 1575	97	2030	
Shanghai International Trade Center Tower 2	370 / 1213	70	2025	
Greenland Bund Centre Tower 1	300 / 984	64	2025	
Axiom Two	250 / 820	-	2026	
Shangxianfang	210 / 689	43	2026	
Binjiang Business District Tower 1	202 / 663	42	2025	
Shanghai Lujiazui Roncheng Changyi Tower 1	200 / 656	40	2026	
Bank of China Financial Center Tower 1	200 / 656	39	2025	
Bank of China Financial Center Tower 2	200 / 656	39	2025	

* Table entries without text indicate that information regarding floor counts, and/or dates of completion has not yet been released.

== Timeline of tallest buildings ==
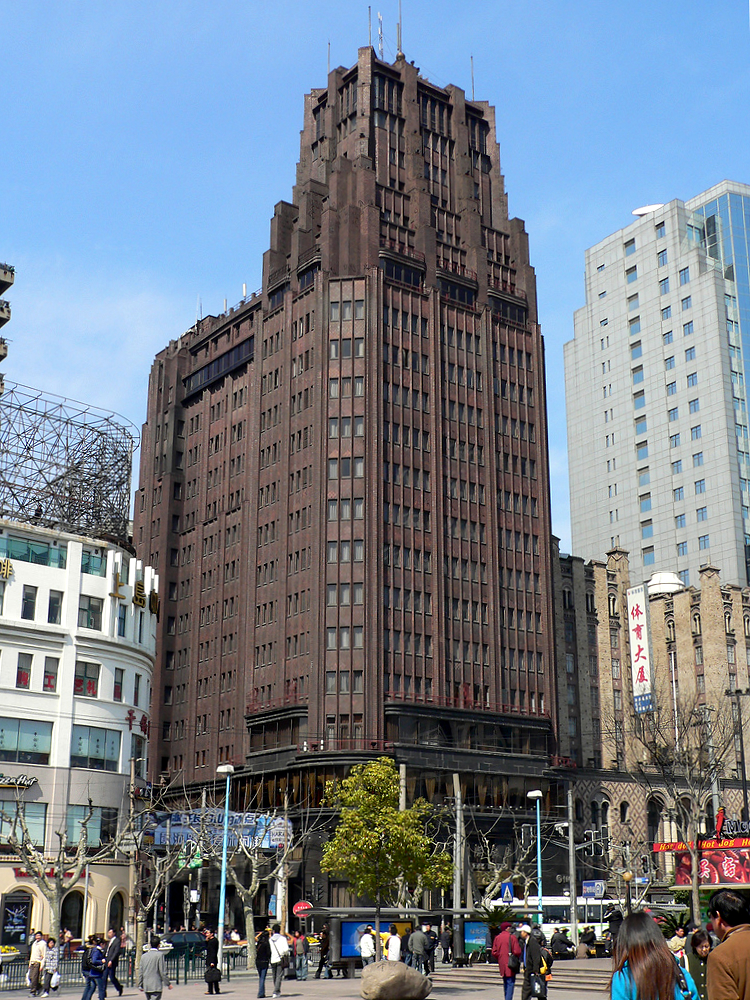
The Park Hotel was the tallest building in Shanghai when measured to roof for 49 years.

This lists buildings that once held the title of tallest building in Shanghai when measured to roof (excluding spire, but including clock tower in the case of the Customs House). When measured to height of structural or architectural top, the Shanghai Exhibition Centre (at 110.4 metres tall to top of spire) held the title from completion in 1955 until overtaken by the Jin Jiang Tower in 1988.

Name	Street address	Years as tallest	Height metres / ft	Floors	Reference
Longhua Pagoda	2853 Longhua Rd	977-1916	41 / 132	6	
Union Building	3 The Bund	1916-1927	46 / 151	6	
Customs House, Shanghai	13 The Bund	1927–1934	82 / 269	8	
Park Hotel	170 Nanjing West Road	1934–1983	84 / 275	22	
Shanghai Hotel	505 Wulumuqi Road North	1983–1985	91 / 299	27	
Union Friendship Tower	100 East Yan'an Road	1985–1987	106 / 348	30	
China Telecom Building	333 Wusheng Road	1987-1988	123 / 403	24	
Jin Jiang Tower	161 Changle Road	1988–1990	153 / 502	46	
The Portman Ritz-Carlton	1376 Nanjing West Road	1990–1995	165 / 541	48	
China Merchants Tower	Lujiazui Central Business District	1995–1996	186 / 610	38	
King Tower	Xin Jin Qiao Road	1996–1998	212 / 696	38	
Jin Mao Tower	88 Century Boulevard	1998–2007	421 / 1,380	88	
Shanghai World Financial Center	100 Century Boulevard	2007–2015	492 / 1,614	101	
Shanghai Tower	501 Yincheng Middle Road	2015–present	632 / 2,093	128	

== See also ==
- List of cities with most skyscrapers
