= List of shopping malls in China =

This is a list of shopping malls in mainland China.

== Shanghai ==
- Global Harbor
- Grand Gateway
- HKRI Taikoo Hui
- IAPM Mall
- Jing An Kerry Centre
- K11
- Longemont Shopping Centre
- Metro-City
- Plaza 66
- Raffles City
- IFC Mall
- The River Mall
- Super Brand Mall
- Nanjing Road

== Beijing ==
- Beijing apm
- Beijing Department Store
- Beijing Mall
- Golden Resources Mall, the world's second largest mall with over 1,000 stores and 6,000,000 square feet (557,000 m^{2}) of space
- INDIGO
- Pinnacle Plaza
- Raffles City
- Solana Shopping Park
- Taikoo Li Sanlitun
- The Malls at Oriental Plaza

== Guangzhou ==
- CITIC Plaza
- Happy Valley Guangzhou
- Taikoo Hui

== Shenzhen ==
- Coastal City
- Yitian Holiday Plaza
- COCO Park

== Chengdu ==
- Sino-Ocean Taikoo Li Chengdu
- SM City Chengdu
- Taikoo Li Chengdu

== Other ==
- Eurasia Shopping Mall, Changchun
- Hundred Years City, Dalian
- Baoli Shopping Park, Wu-si
- SM City Jinjiang, Jinjiang
- SM City Xiamen, Xiamen
- SM Lifestyle Center, Zibo
- Starlight Place, Chongqing
- South China Mall, Dongguan, the world's largest mall, with 2,570 stores and 6,590,612 square feet (612,000 m^{2}) of space
- Zhongda International, Xi'an

== See also ==
- List of shopping centres in Hong Kong
