= Eurasia (disambiguation) =

Eurasia or Eurasian may refer to:

- Eurasia, landmass containing the traditional continents of Europe and Asia
  - Eurasian Plate, a tectonic plate
  - Eurasian Steppe, an ecoregion
    - Eurasian nomads
- People having mixed European and Asian (particularly East/Southeast Asian) ancestry, primarily associated with the following ethnic groups:
  - Eurasian Singaporeans
  - Anglo-Burmese people, of Burmese and European descent
  - Anglo-Indian people, of mixed Indian and British ancestry
  - Filipino Mestizos, of mixed Filipino and Spanish ancestry
  - Indo people, of mixed Dutch and Indonesian descent
  - Luso-Asians, umbrella term for people of mixed Portuguese and Asian descent
    - Burgher people in Sri Lanka, of partial Portuguese and Dutch ancestry
    - Kristang people a.k.a. Portuguese-Eurasians, of mixed Portuguese and Malaccan descent
    - Luso-Indians, of mixed Indian and Portuguese ancestry
    - Macanese people, of mixed predominantly Cantonese and Portuguese ancestry
- Eurasia (Nineteen Eighty-Four), a fictional superstate or country in Orwell's novel, which consists of Europe and Northern Asia.
- Eurasianism, a geopolitical doctrine espoused by Zyuganov, Dugin and Primakov amongst others
- Eurasia (TV series), a 2003 Japanese-French history documentary series
- Eurasia (train), a name of electric multiple unit ESh2 manufactured by Stadler KISS

Buildings:

- Eurasia (skyscraper), in Moscow, Russia
- Eurasia Shopping Mall, a shopping mall located in Changchun, China
- Eurasia Tunnel, road tunnel in Istanbul, Turkey, crossing underneath the Bosporus strait

Organisations:

- Eurasian Economic Union (est. 2015), an economic union of post-Soviet states
- Eurasia Group (est. 1998), a global political risk consultancy
- Eurasia Foundation (est. 2009), a Japanese-based non-profit
- Eurasia Foundation Central Asia, a U.S. based non-profit
- Eurasia Aviation Corporation, a former Chinese airline

== See also ==
- Afro-Asians, people of mixed African and Asian ancestry
- Amerasian, people born in Asia to an Asian mother and a U.S. military father
- Euronesian, people of mixed European and either Polynesian, Melanesian or Micronesian descent
- Hāfu (loanword from English half), a person ethnically half Japanese and half non-Japanese of any background
