= Li Yong =

Li Yong may refer to:

- Li Yong (poet) (678–747), Tang dynasty poet and calligrapher
- Li Yong (chancellor) (died 820), Tang Dynasty chancellor
- Li Yong (prince) (died 838), Tang Dynasty prince
- Li Yong (politician) (born 1951), Chinese politician
- Li Yong (executive), Chinese executive who served as general manager of the China National Offshore Oil Corporation between 2020 and 2023
- Li Yong (television host) (1968–2018), Chinese television host
