= Lu Shen (Ming dynasty) =

Chinese scholar-official and calligrapher

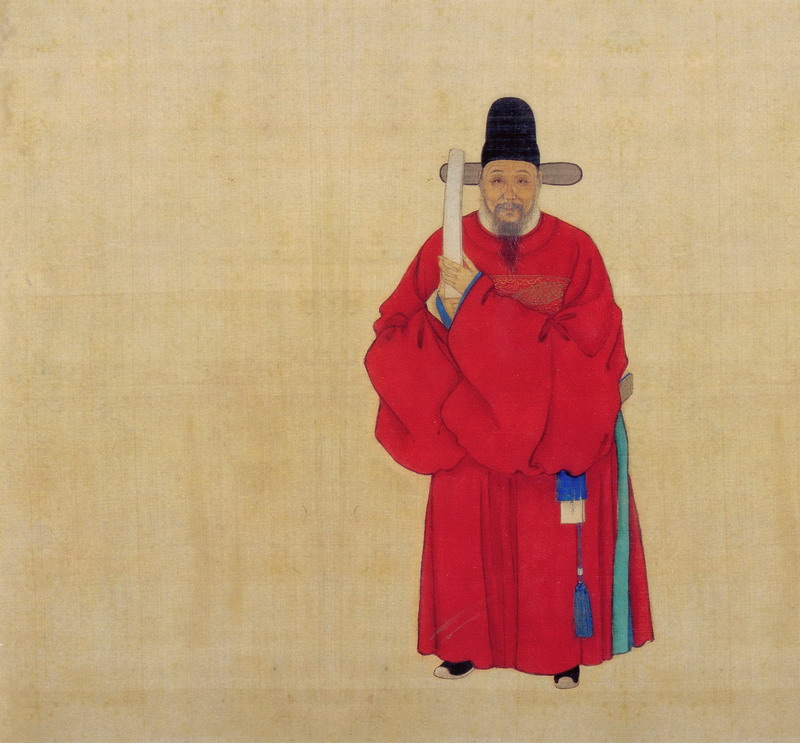
Lu Shen (Shengchao Songjiang bangyan huaxiang ce)

Lu Shen (陸深; 1477–1544) was a Chinese scholar-official and calligrapher of the early Ming dynasty.

== Life and work ==
Originally named Rong (榮), his courtesy name was Ziyuan (子淵), and his style name was Yanshan (儼山). He was a native of Shanghai and served as a Hanlin academician. Lu Shen's calligraphy was influenced by Li Yong (李邕; 674–746) and Zhao Mengfu (趙孟頫; 1254–1322).

== Works ==
His collected works are titled Yanshan ji 儼山集 and Yanshan waiji 儼山外集. The Hanyu da zidian (HYDZD) f.e. is using his works in the following editions:

- Chunyutang suibi 春雨堂随笔 (Jinxian huiyan 今献汇言)
- Jintai jiwen 金台纪闻 (Guang Baichuan xuehai 广百川学海)
- Yutang manbi 玉堂漫笔 (Guang Baichuan xuehai 广百川学海)
- Zhonghetang suibi 中和堂随笔 (Yanshan waiji 俨山外集)
- Xishan yuhua 溪山余话 (Guang Baichuan xuehai 广百川学海)
- Yuanfengtang man shu 愿丰堂漫书 (Guang Baichuan xuehai 广百川学海)
- Hefen yanxian lu 河汾燕闲录 (Yanshan waiji 俨山外集)
- Ting can lu 停骖录 (Yanshan waiji 俨山外集)
- Yan xian lu 燕闲录 (Baoyantang miji 宝颜堂秘笈)
- Chuanyi lu 传疑录 (Yanshan waiji 俨山外集)
- Zhi ming lu 知命录 (Yanshan waiji 俨山外集)

== See also ==
- Lujiazui
- Songiang (Chinese)
