= Imperial City Wall Relics Park =

Garden in Beijing

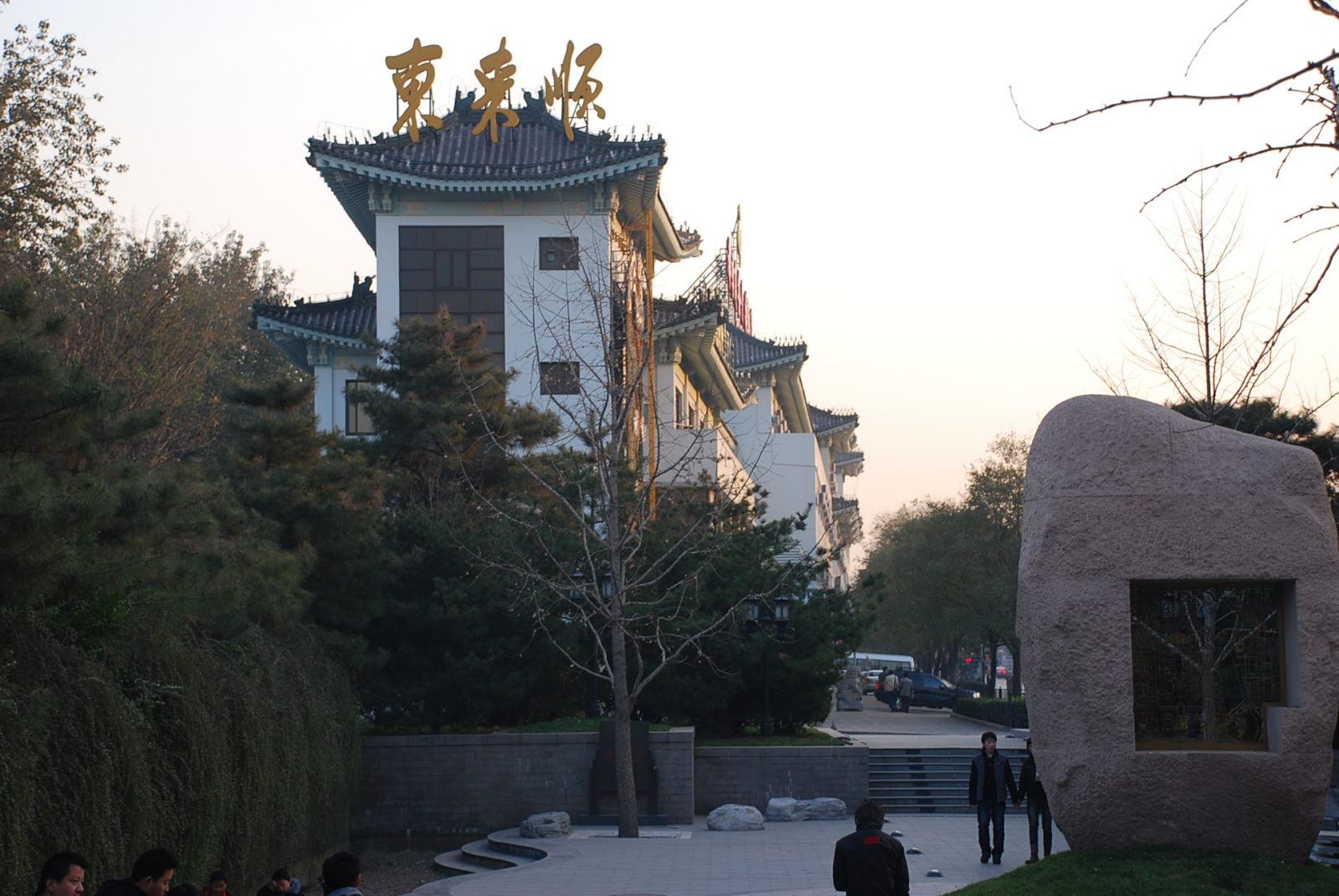
- Interactive map of Imperial City Wall Relics Park
- Type: Garden
- Location: China
- Coordinates: 39.919°N 116.40055°E

Imperial City Wall Relics Park (also translated as Huangchenggen Relics Park and Imperial Palace Wall Relics Park) is a garden near Forbidden City and Wangfujing in Beijing, China.
