= Clean Games =

Non-profit eco volunteer organization in Russia

- Founder: Dmitry Ioffe
- Type: Non-governmental organization
- Purpose: Ecology, Environmentalism
- Origins: Saint-Petersburg, Russia
- Website: Official website

Clean Games is a civic organization working with eco-activists to create clean-up events of natural areas. The project offers a gamified way of garbage collecting to engage more people into participation.

== Mission ==
According to Clean Games, the goal of the organization is to raise awareness of environmental pollution and encourage ecological volunteering in local communities.

Events are held in a format of team competitions, where participants collect and sort waste. To locate trash, navigate players and keep teams’ scores, a mobile app is used. It is a location-based game that uses GPS service to pinpoint objects (littered areas in particular). The project was founded by Dmitry Ioffe, and first started from Saint Petersburg, Russia in 2014.

== History ==
The project first started in 2014 in Leningrad Oblast, Russia. By 2017, the games were held in 42 Russian cities. In 2018 the methodology has started being implemented in other countries. As of 2021, Clean Games were held in Belarus, Bulgaria, China, Denmark, Estonia, Finland, Georgia, Germany, India, Ireland, Italy, Japan, Kazakhstan, Latvia, Lithuania, Malaysia, Nigeria, Poland, Russia, Sweden, Ukraine, United States, Venezuela, and Vietnam.

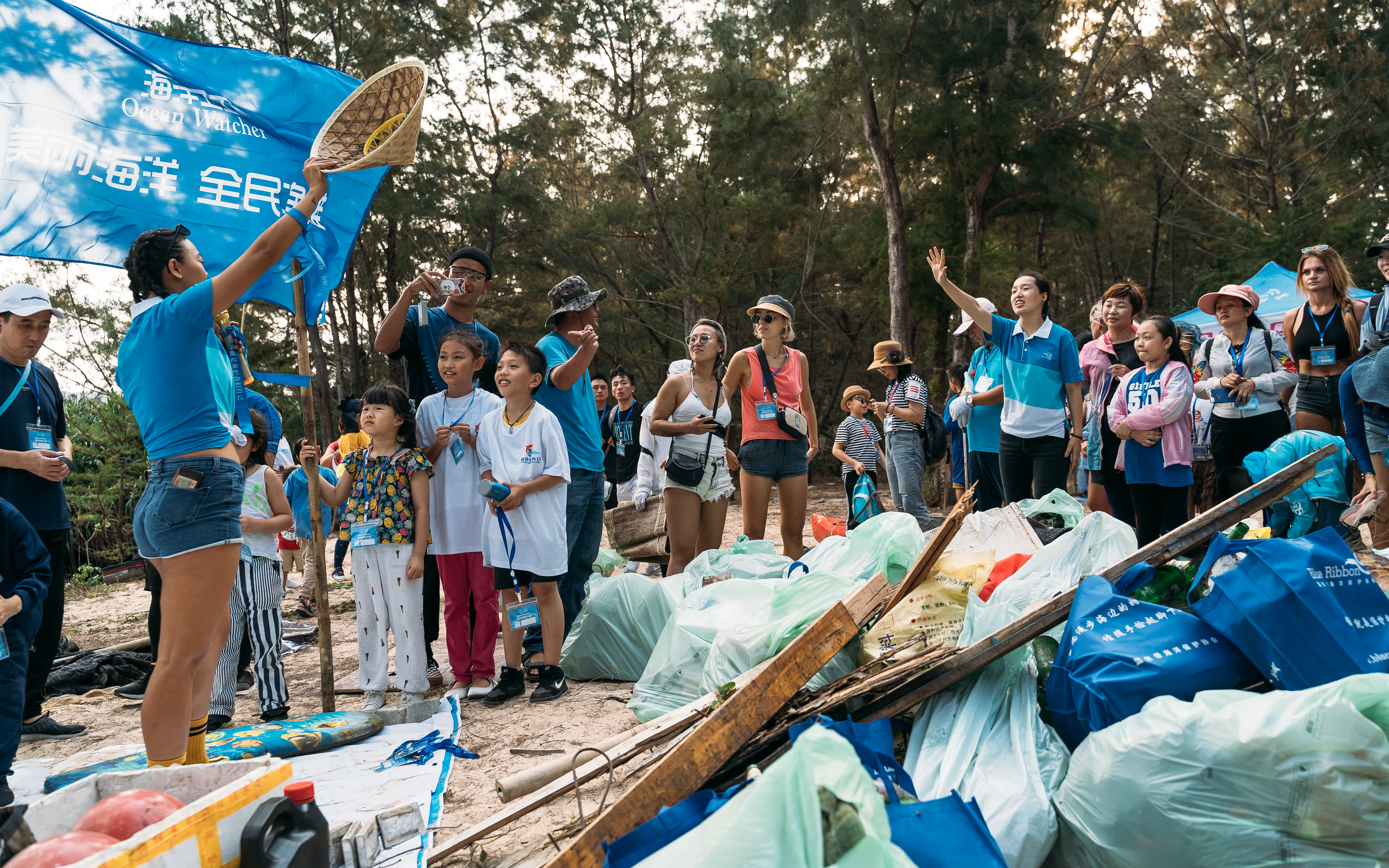
Clean Games in China, 2019

In September 2019, Clean Games partnered up with Let's Do It! World organization to hold the first Clean Games Baltic Cup in the framework of World Cleanup Day. Since then, the Cup has become an annual event in the countries of the Baltic region. This project was supported by the Council of the Baltic Sea States (CBSS), Union of the Baltic Cities (UBC), and Nordic Council of Ministers. In 2021 Clean Games joined the Coalition Clean Baltic.

In 2020, in partnership with World Aral Region Charity of Glenmont, New York, an Intercontinental Cup «Russia – USA» was organized. The event was held in 11 Russian and 9 American cities, with support from Eurasia Foundation's Social Expertise Exchange (SEE).

Clean Games is the national winner from Russia and one of the finalists at the 22nd Energy Globe Award. The awarding ceremony was held in Glasgow, in the framework of the United Nations Climate Change Conference (COP26) conference.
