= Oriental Plaza (disambiguation) =

Oriental Plaza is a shopping mall in Johannesburg, South Africa. The name may also refer to:

- O.P. Place, formerly known as Oriental Plaza, a shopping mall in Bangkok, Thailand
- The Malls at Oriental Plaza, a shopping mall in Beijing, China
