= Aurora Plaza =

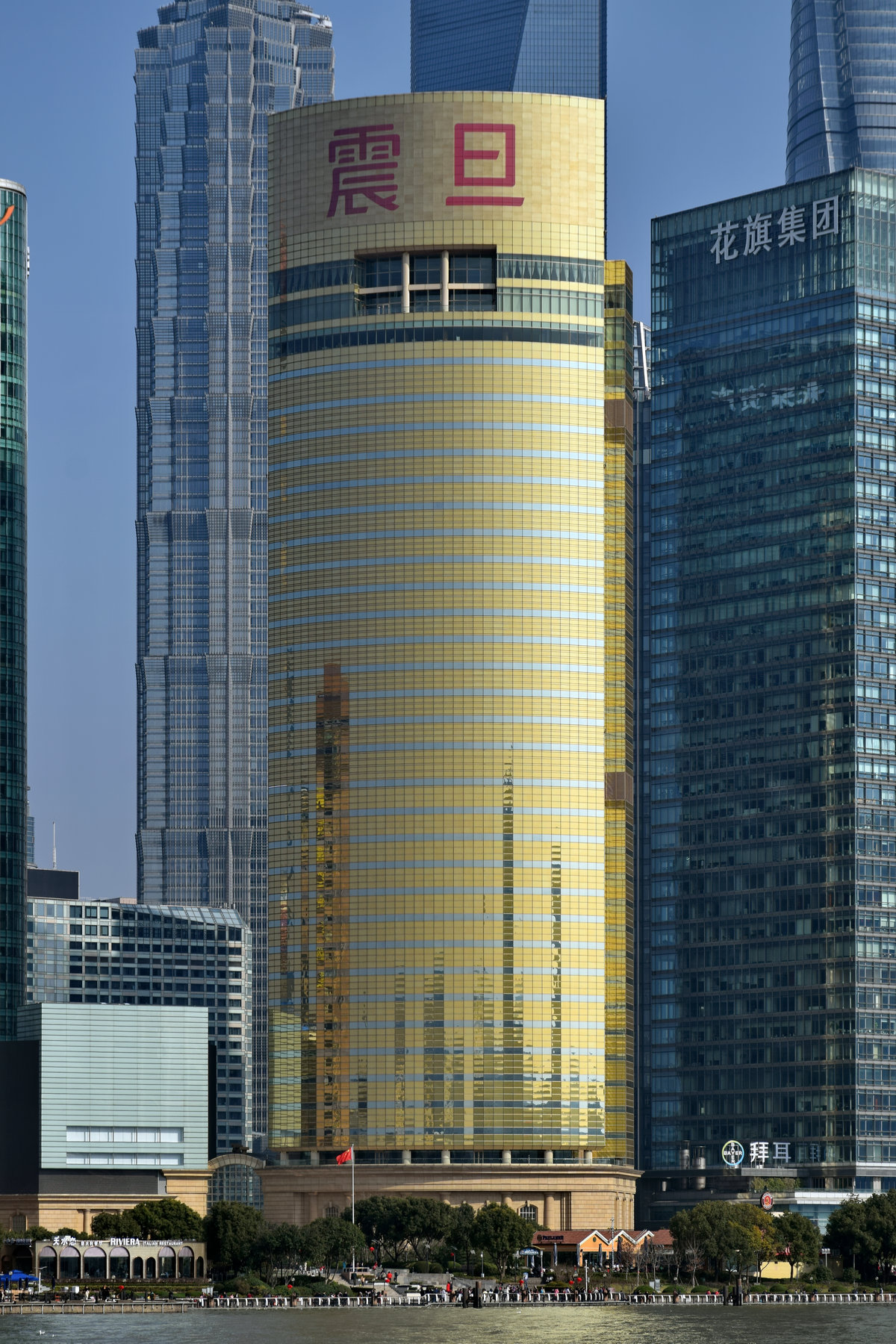
- Aurora Plaza after the lettering was changed.
- Interactive map of the Aurora Plaza area

General information
- Type: Office
- Location: Shanghai, China
- Coordinates: 31.2365°N 121.495°E
- Completed: 2003

Height
- Roof: 185 m (607 ft)

Technical details
- Floor count: 38

Design and construction
- Architect: Nikken Sekkei

Aurora Plaza is a 185 m high skyscraper in the Pudong financial district, Lujiazui, of Shanghai, China, that was completed in 2003. It is one of the more recognisable of the smaller towers in the Pudong skyline, due to its curved sleek facade, its former large "AURORA" logo and a large video screen projected onto the front of the building at night.

== Gallery ==
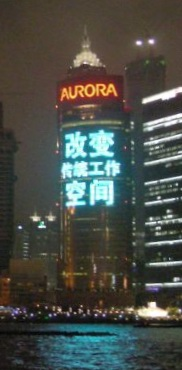
Aurora Plaza at Night

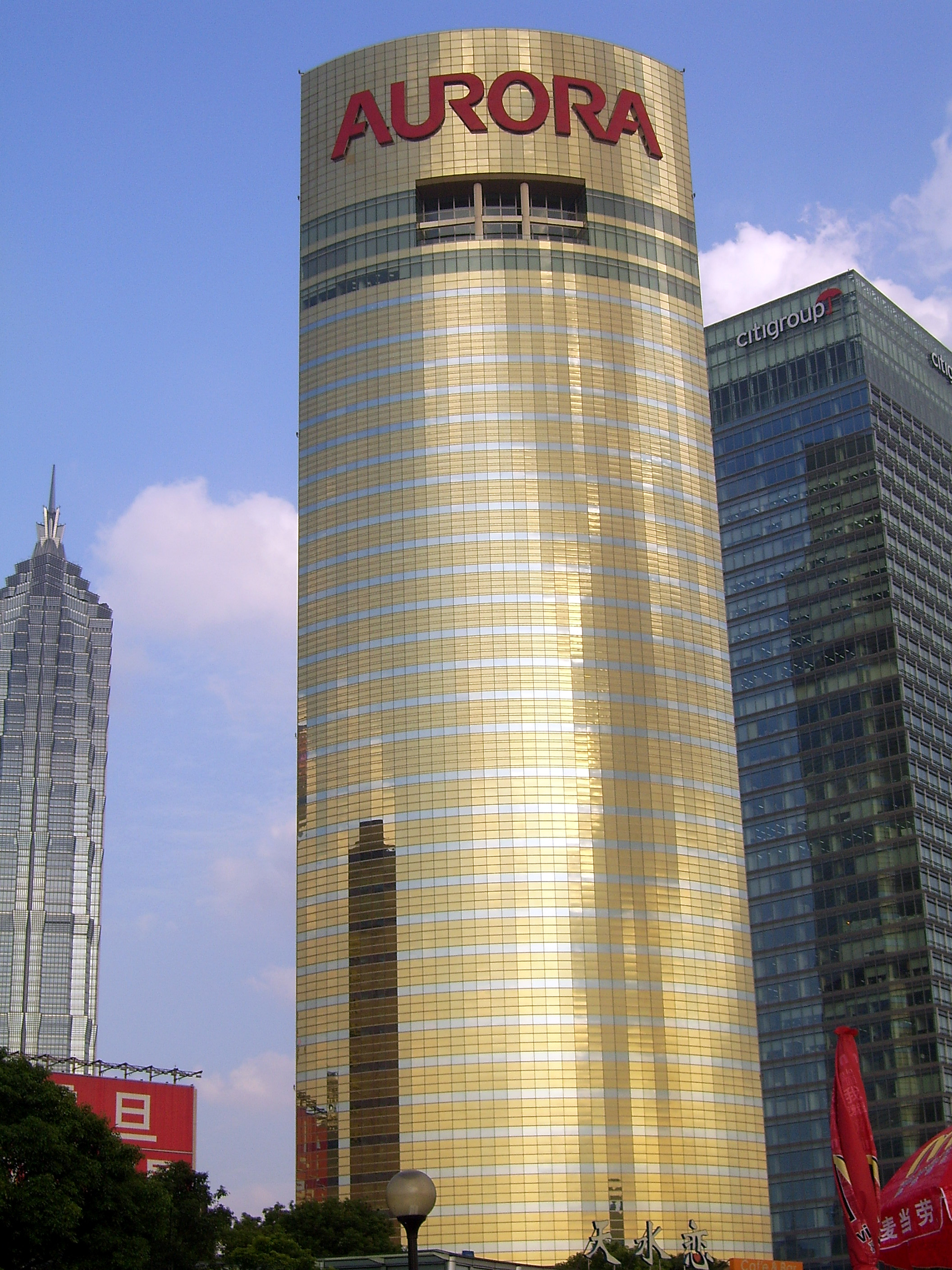
Aurora Plaza with the previous "AURORA" lettering.

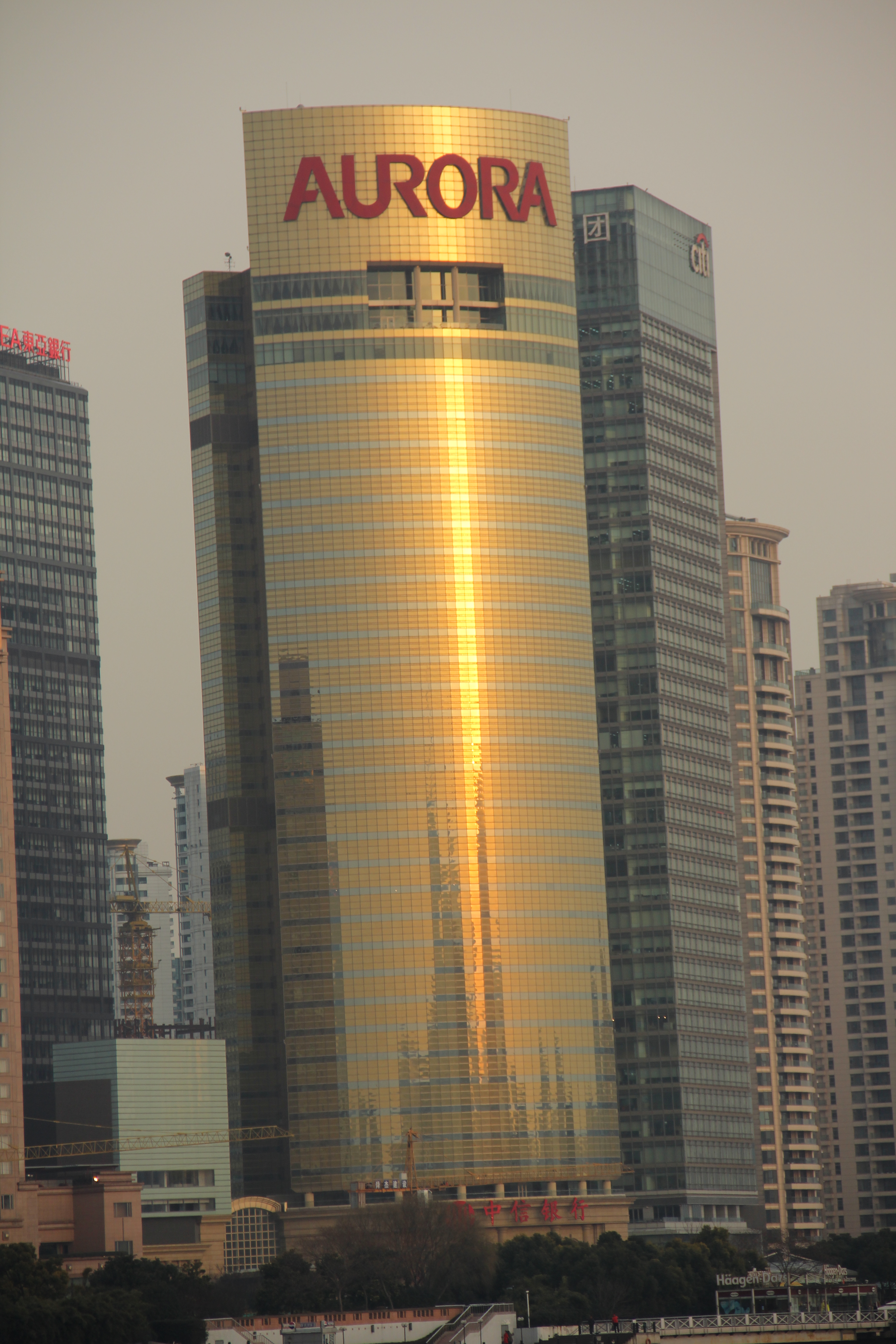
Aurora Plaza in the evening sun

== See also ==
- List of tallest buildings in Shanghai
