= Super Brand Mall =

- 正大广场
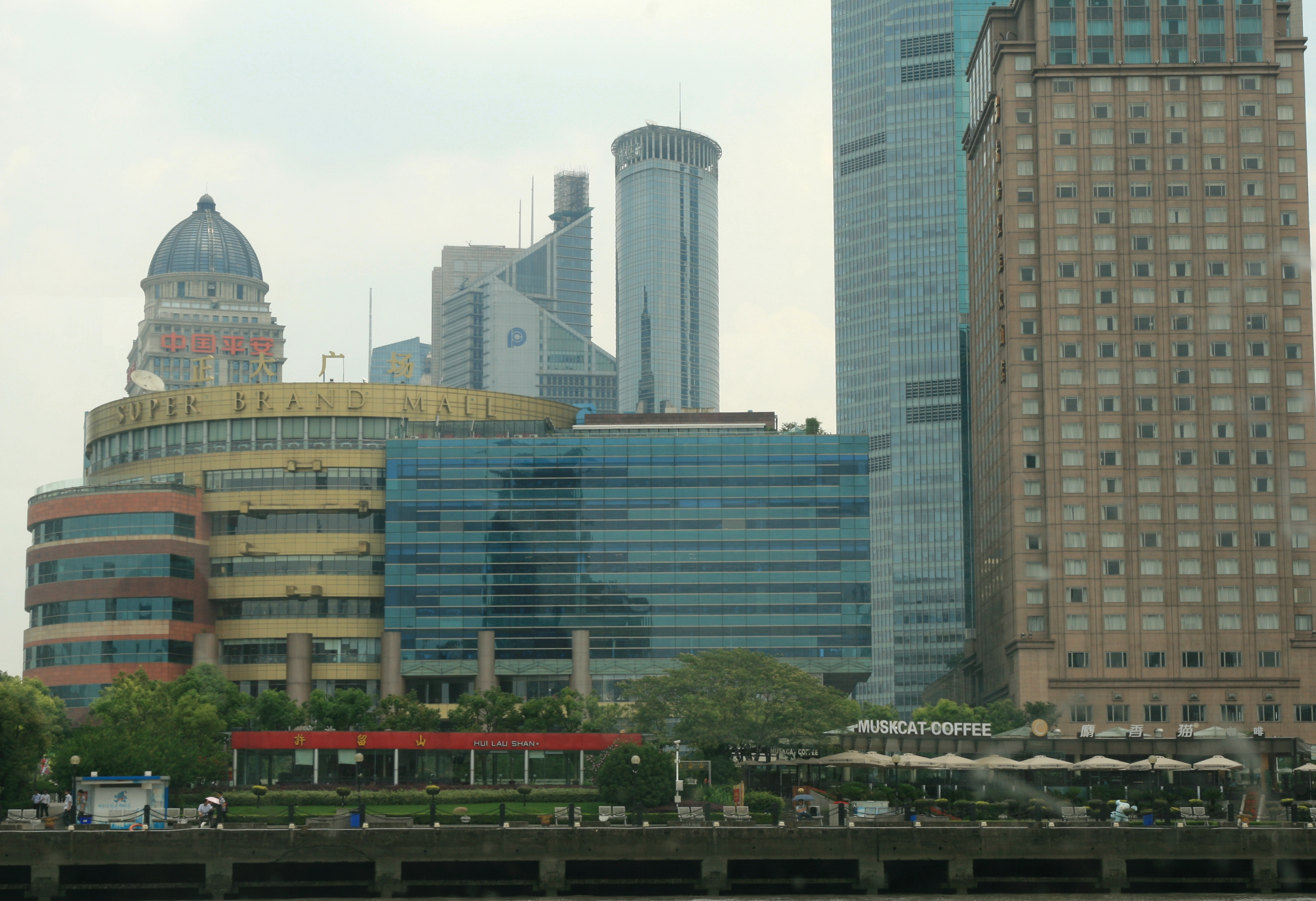
- Super Brand Mall seen from the Huangpu River
- Location: Lujiazui, Shanghai, China
- Coordinates: 31.2385°N 121.4940°E
- Address: 168 Lujiazui Xi Lu, Pudong New Area, Shanghai, China
- Opened: 2002.10.18
- Developer: Shanghai Kinghill
- Manager: Shanghai Kinghill
- Owner: Shanghai Kinghill Ltd. (Chia Tai Group)
- Architect: ECADI & The Jerde Partnership International, Inc.
- Floor area: 121,433 m^{2} (1,307,090 sq ft)
- Floors: 13
- Website: www.superbrandmall.com

Super Brand Mall (Chinese: 正大广场; pinyin: Zhèngdà Guǎngcháng) is a shopping mall in Shanghai, China. It was developed by Shanghai Kingshill, a subsidiary of Charoen Pokphand. It is set in the Lujiazui Finance and Trade Zone. The Super Brand Mall has 13 floors, with a total gross floor area of 250,000 m^{2} (2,700,000 sq ft). In 2004, the mall received ISO 9001 certification.

== History ==
The mall opened in October 2002. The mall struggled when it opened owing to the consumer market still being in its infancy. There was a low occupancy rate; many stores were unoccupied. The first reason was that the mall had an excessive investment in which it was significantly bigger than comparable malls. The second reason was that it was based in the Pudong district of Shanghai, where consumers generally spend much less compared to Nanjing Road and Huaihai Road, which are conventional business hubs.

Between April and June 2022, the mall cut tenants' lease payments by more than ¥70 million (US$10852713) to preserve the occupancy rate that the COVID-19 pandemic had reduced. It reached a 75% occupancy rate by August of that year.

== See also ==
- List of shopping malls in China
