= Wangfujing =

Shopping street in Dongcheng District, Beijing, China

Coordinates: 39°54′40.16″N 116°24′18.99″E

Wangfujing Street (Chinese: 王府井大街; pinyin: Wángfǔjǐng Dàjiē) is a shopping street in Beijing, China, located in Dongcheng District. Since the middle of the Ming Dynasty there have been commercial activities in the area. In the Qing Dynasty, ten aristocratic estates and princess residence were built here, soon after when a well full of sweet water was discovered, thereby giving the street its name "Wangfu" (Prince's residence), "Jing" (Well).

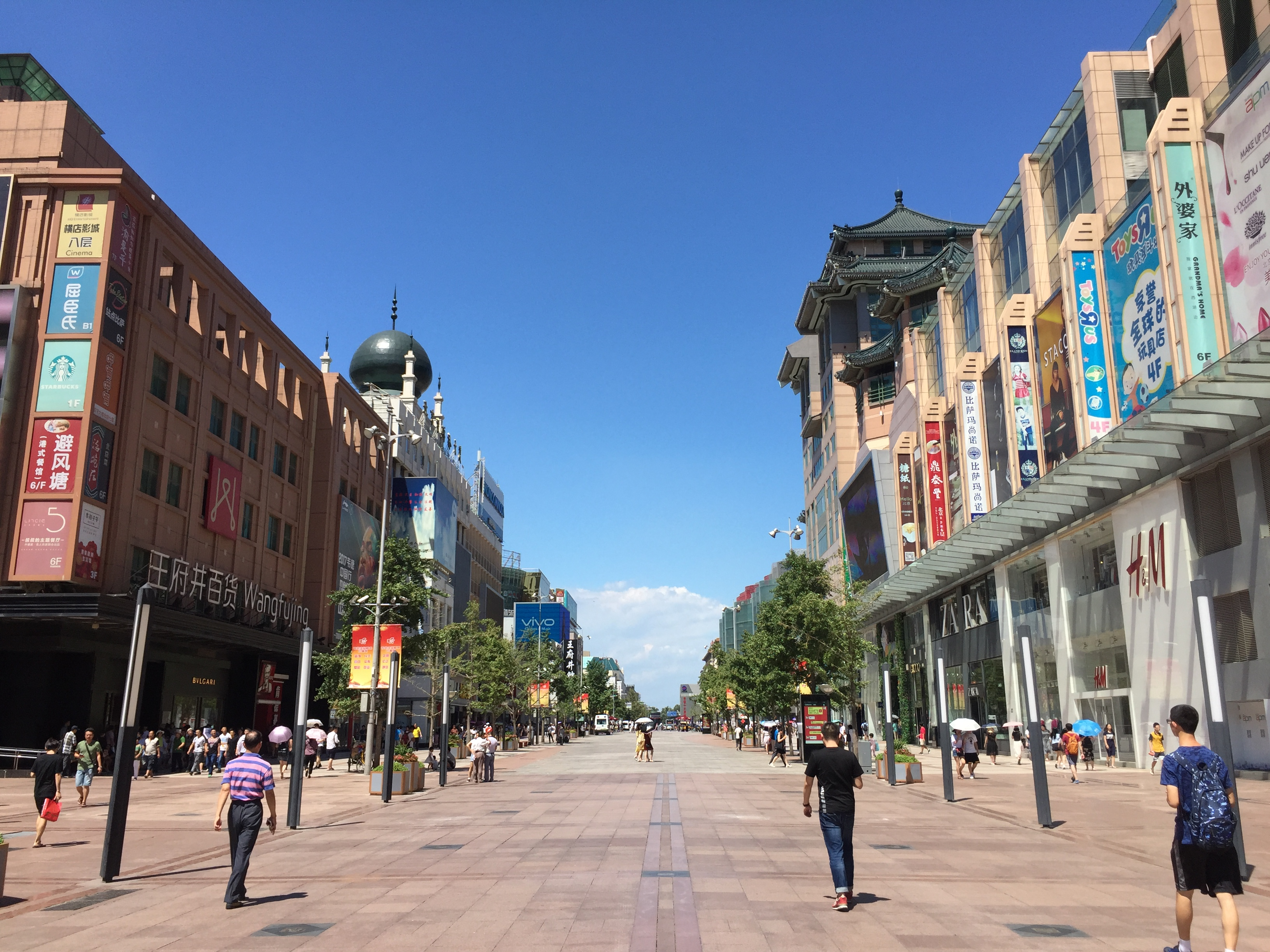
Wangfujing Street

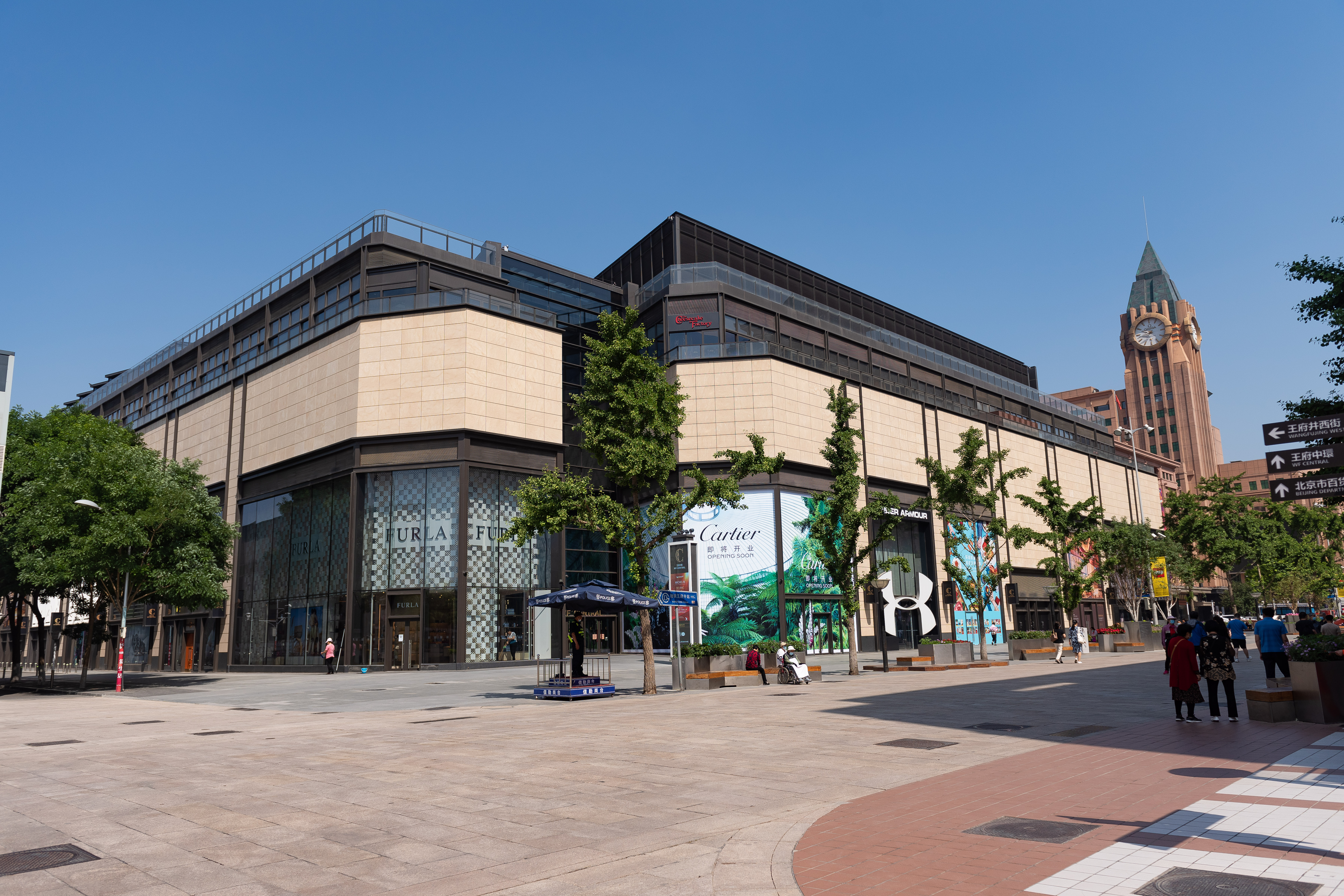
WF Central

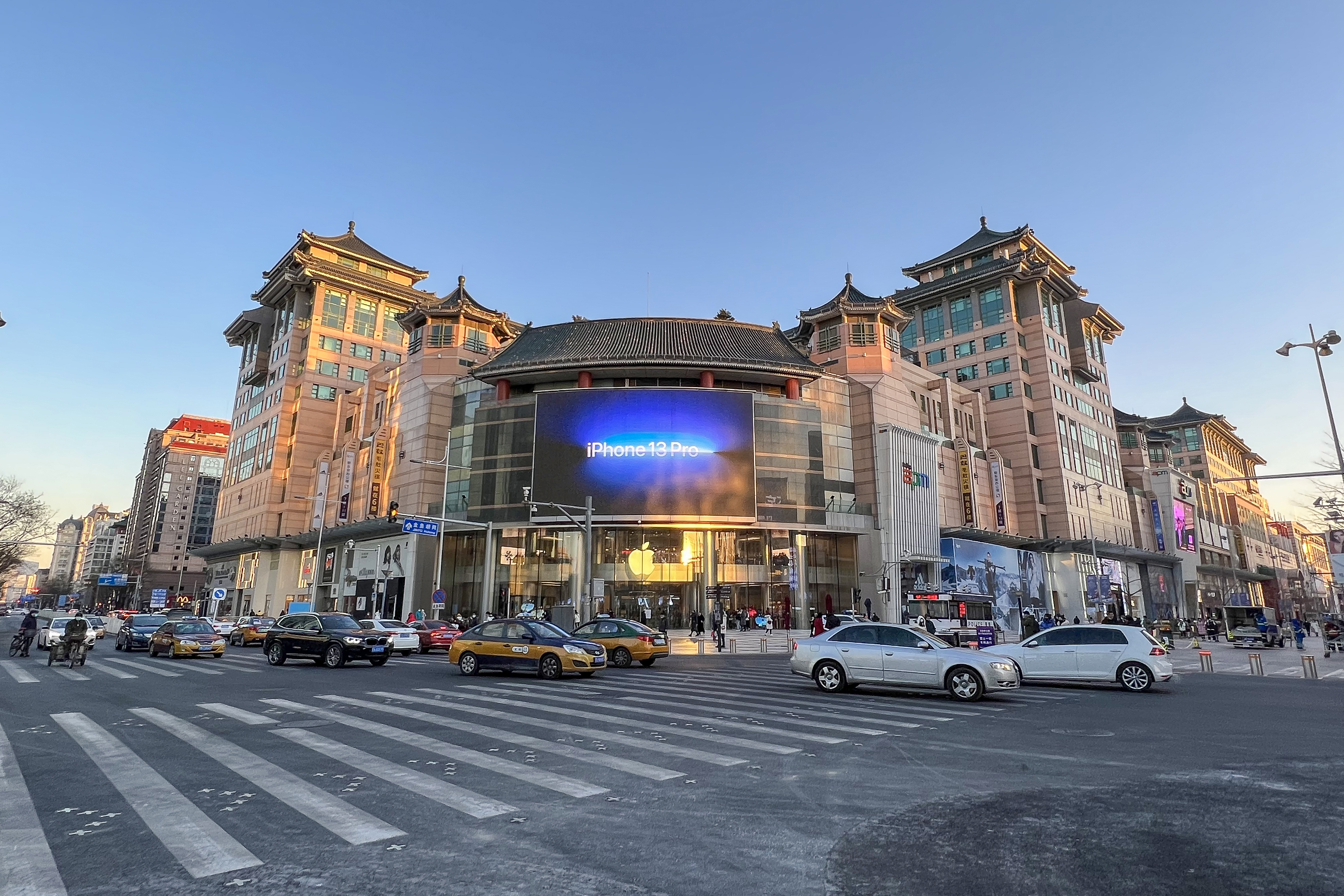
Beijing apm

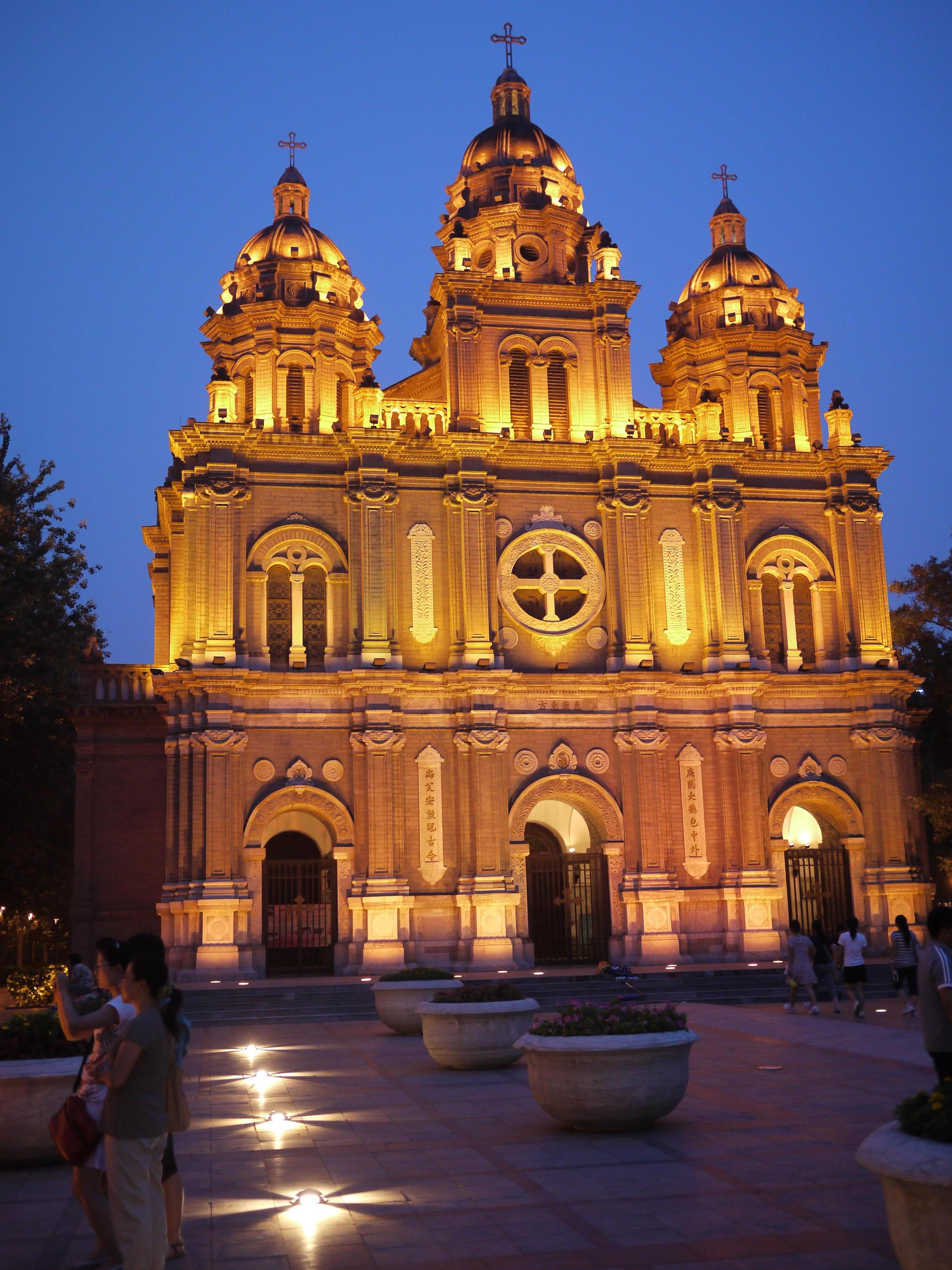
St. Joseph's Church

== Location ==
Wangfujing Street starts from Wangfujing South Entrance (王府井南口, Wángfǔjǐng Nánkǒu), where the Oriental Plaza, Beijing Hotel, and the Wangfujing metro station are located. The street then heads north, passing the Wangfujing Bookstore, the Beijing Department Store as well as the Beijing Foreign Languages Bookstore before ending at the Beijing apm and St. Joseph's Catholic Church.

== History ==
The street was also previously known as Morrison Street in English, after the Australian journalist George Ernest Morrison. Wangfujing is also one of the traditional downtown areas of Beijing, along with Liulichang.

Until the late 1990s, the street was open to traffic. Modifications in 1999 and 2000 made much of Wangfujing Street pedestrian only (aside from the tour trolley). Now through traffic detours to the east of the street.

The 2011 Chinese pro-democracy protests were planned to take place in Wangfujing. Some violence occurred there between police and foreign journalists.

== Stores ==
Wangfujing is now home to around 280 shops. Wangfujing malls include the Beijing Department Store, Beijing apm, Beijing Mall and The Malls at Oriental Plaza, and WF Central.

== Food and snacks ==
Wangfujing Snack Street (王府井小吃街), located west of the Wangfujing main street (王府井大街), contains many restaurants and street food stalls. The food stalls serve a variety of common and exotic street food, including chuanr (meat kebabs, commonly made of lamb) and desserts, such as tanghulu or candied fruits on a stick.

== Transport ==
The Wangfujing station of Beijing Subway Lines 1 and 8, is located at the intersection of Wangfujing Street and Chang'an Avenue.

== See also ==
- Beijing central business district
- List of leading shopping streets and districts by city
