= Beijing Department Store =

Department store in Beijing, China

- 北京市百货大楼
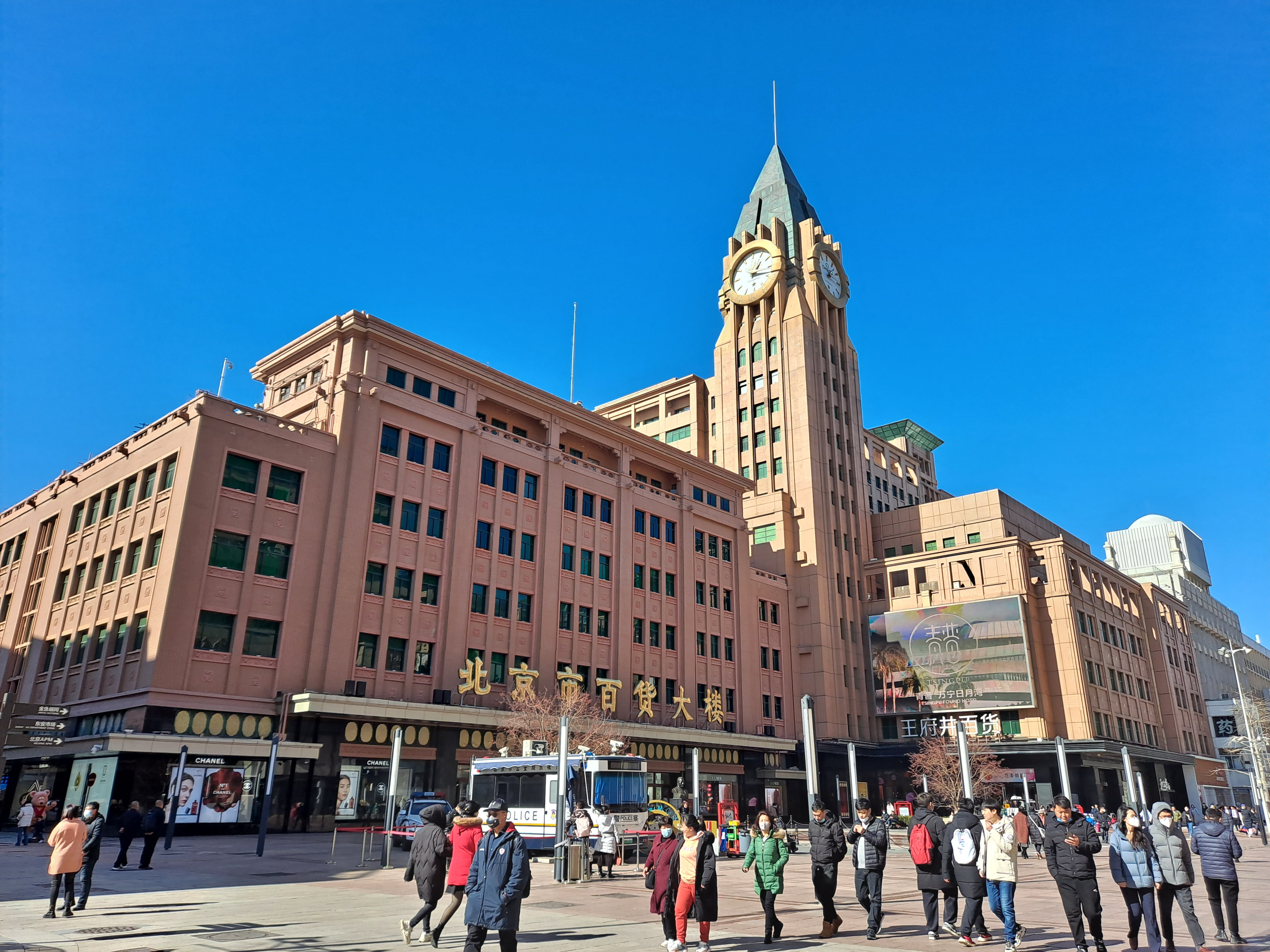
- Building facade in 2023
- Interactive map of the Beijing Department Store area
- Former names: Beijing Wangfujing Department Store

General information
- Status: Completed
- Architectural style: Stalinist Classicism
- Location: 255 Wangfujing Street, Beijing, China
- Coordinates: 39.9133°N 116.4104°E
- Opened: September 1955

Technical details
- Floor count: 6
- Floor area: 39,000 m^{2}

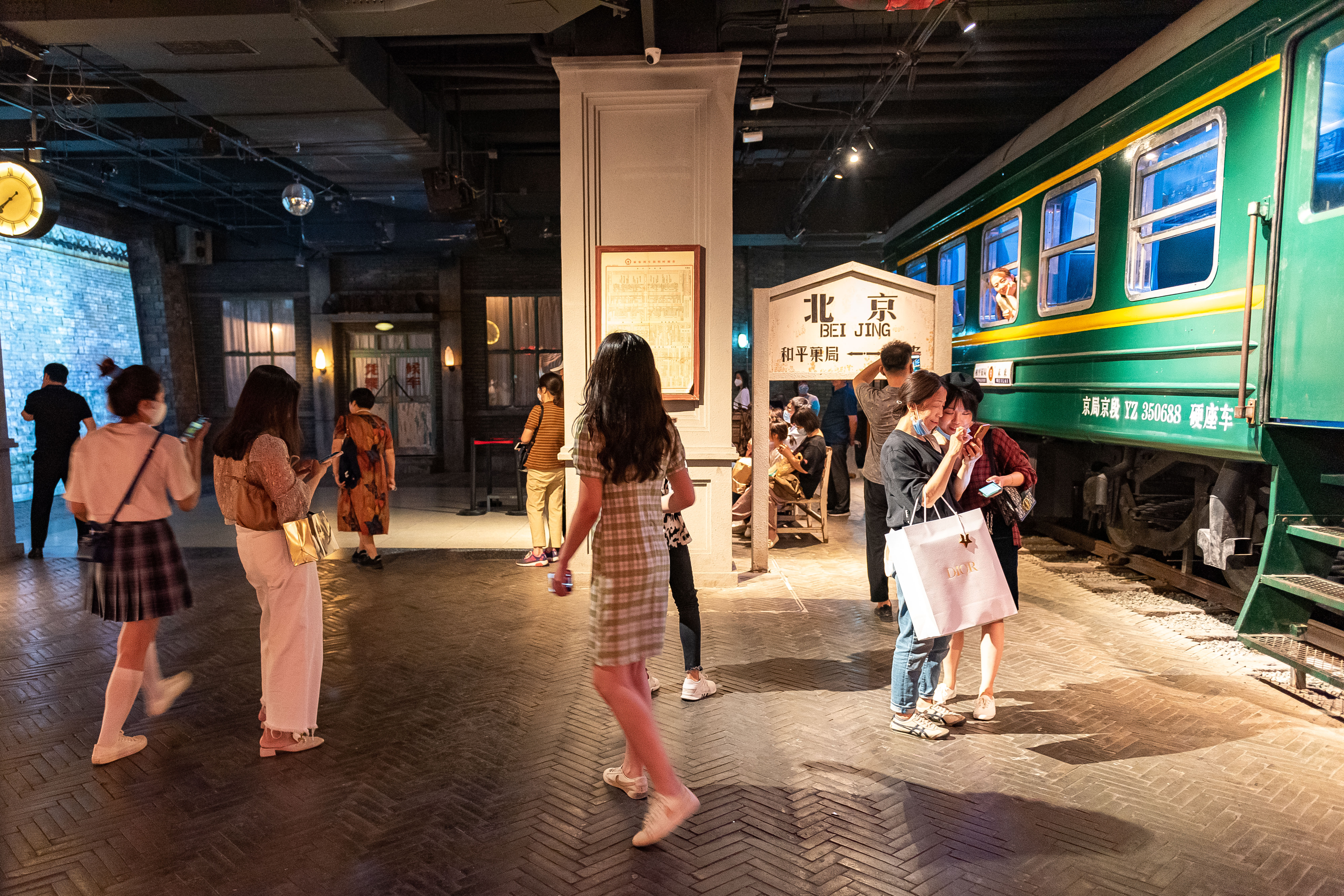
Heping Guoju, the retro theme street in Beijing Department Store

Beijing Department Store (Chinese: 北京市百货大楼; pinyin: Běijīng Shì Bǎihuò Dàlóu) is a major department store on Wangfujing street, Beijing, China.

The department store was opened in September 1955 under the name of Wangfujing Department Store (王府井百货商店). It changed to its present name in July 1968. In the 1970s an office building and a warehouse were built and annexed to the main building.

The store offers a wide range of merchandise very similar to an American department store.

In August 2019, an underground retro commercial street and immersive museum called Heping Guoju (和平菓局) opened to public on the B2 floor of Beijing Department Store.
