= Beijing Mall =

Shopping mall in Wangfujing, Beijing, China

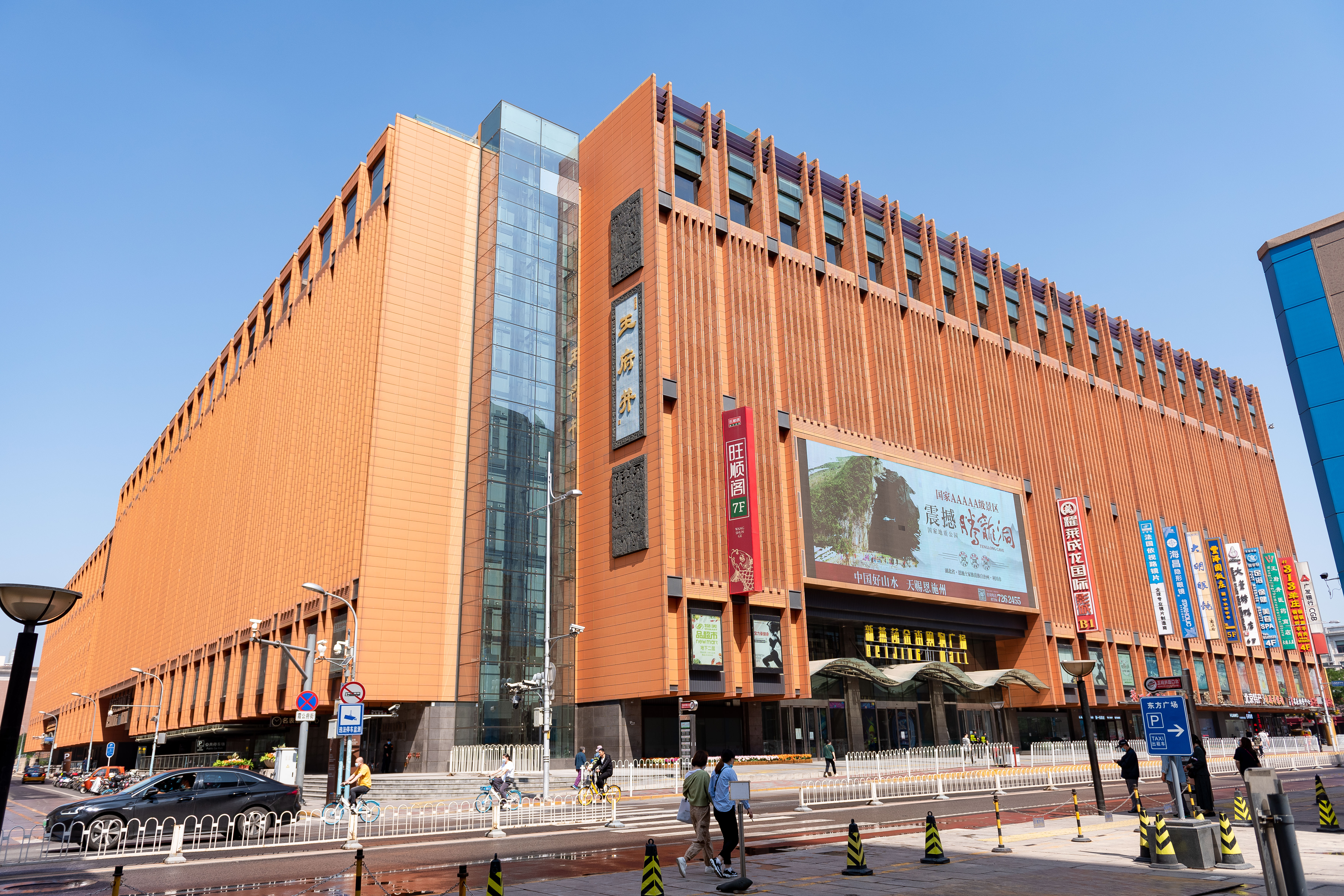
- Exterior in 2021
- Location: Beijing, China
- Coordinates: 39.90848°N 116.40443°E
- Opened: July 2004
- Closed: 2020

The Beijing Mall (Chinese: 新燕莎金街购物广场; lit. 'New Yansha Golden Street shopping mall') was a shopping mall at Wangfujing in Beijing, China, using the Phase II building of Beijing Hotel at 301 Wangfujing Street. It is developed by the New Yansha Group, a subsidiary of Beijing Tourism Group, and opened in July 2004.

The mall was closed in 2020 due to deficit. In 2023, it was renovated as WFJ Xiyue.

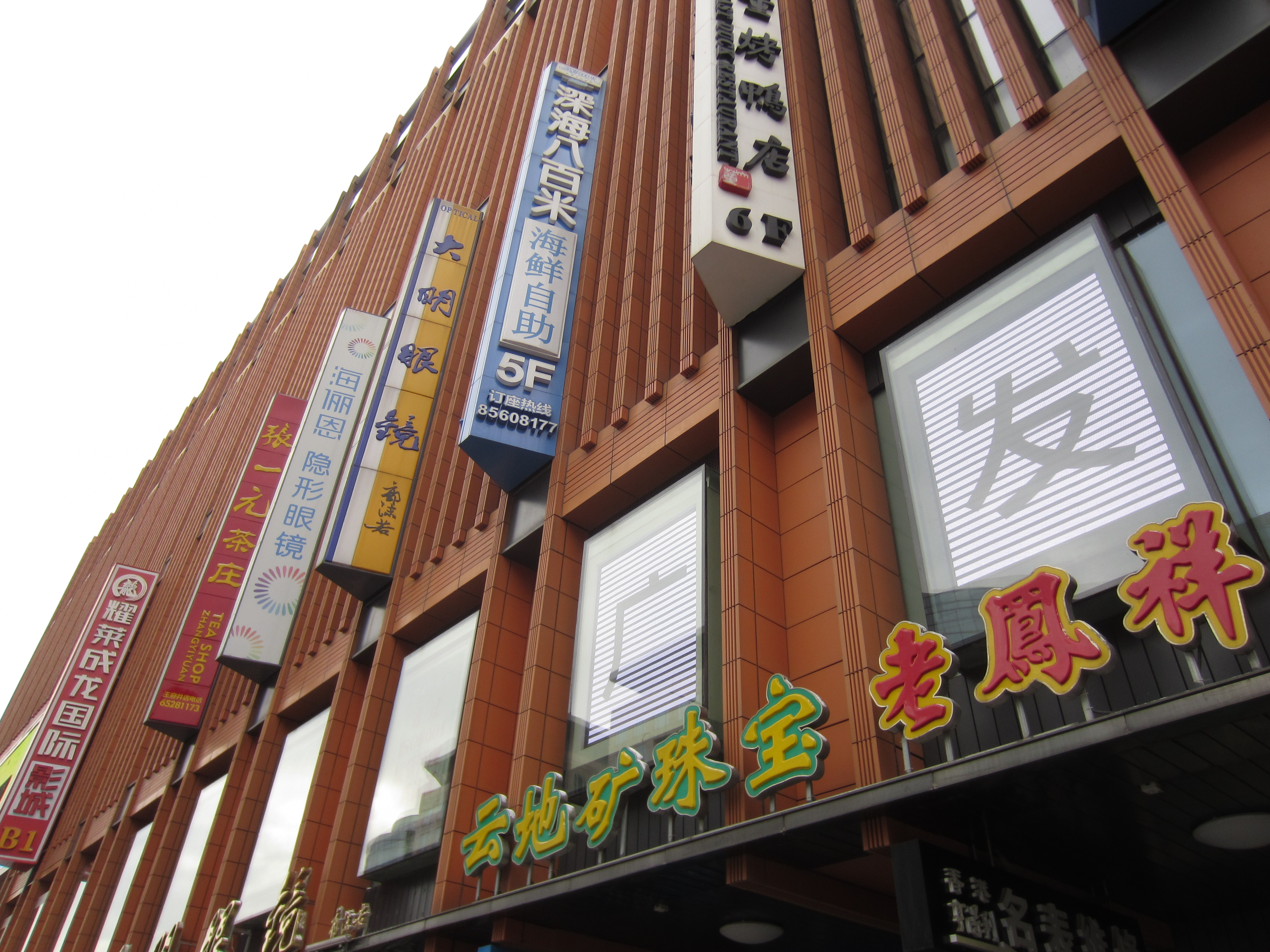
Exterior

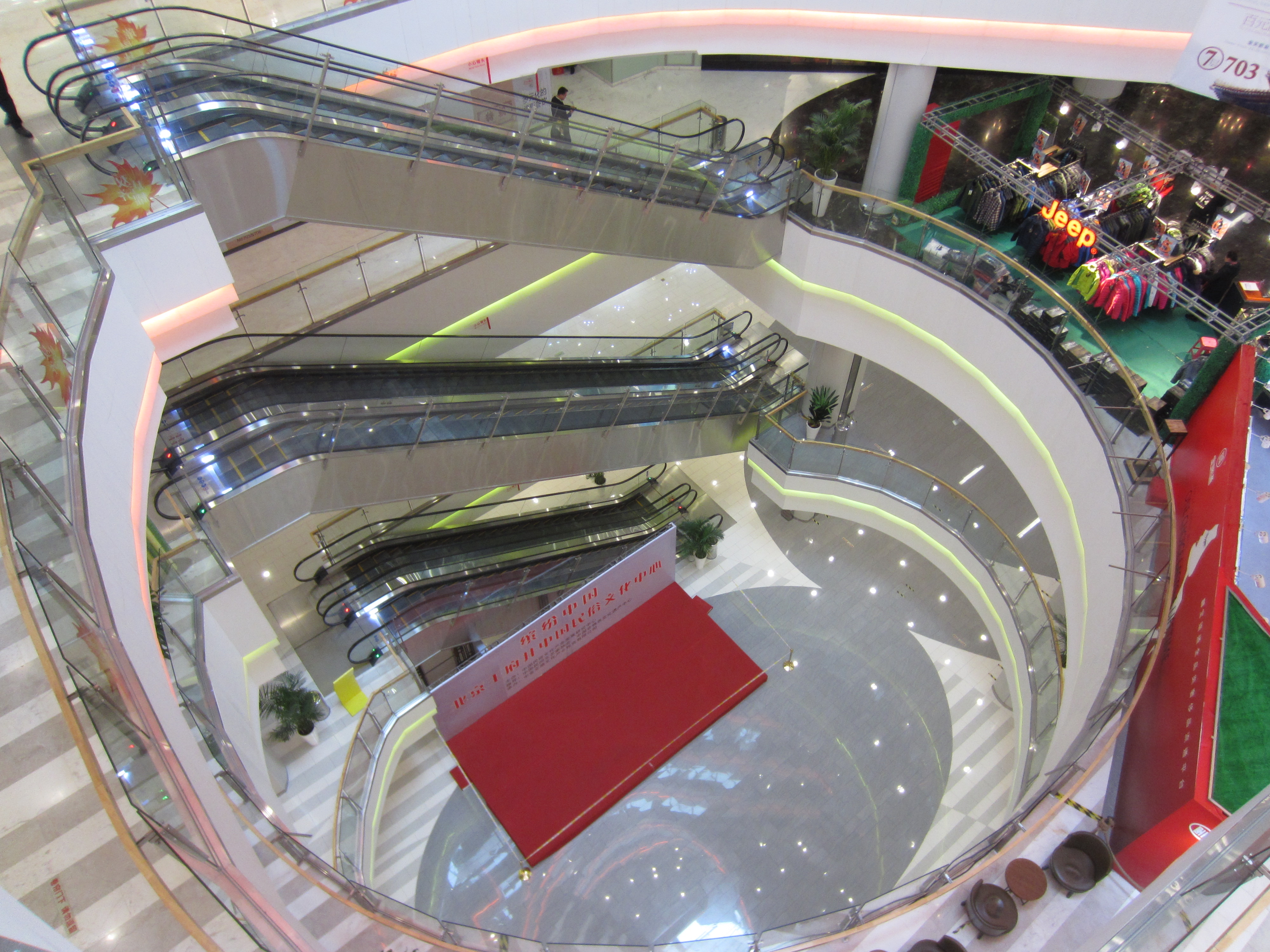
Interior

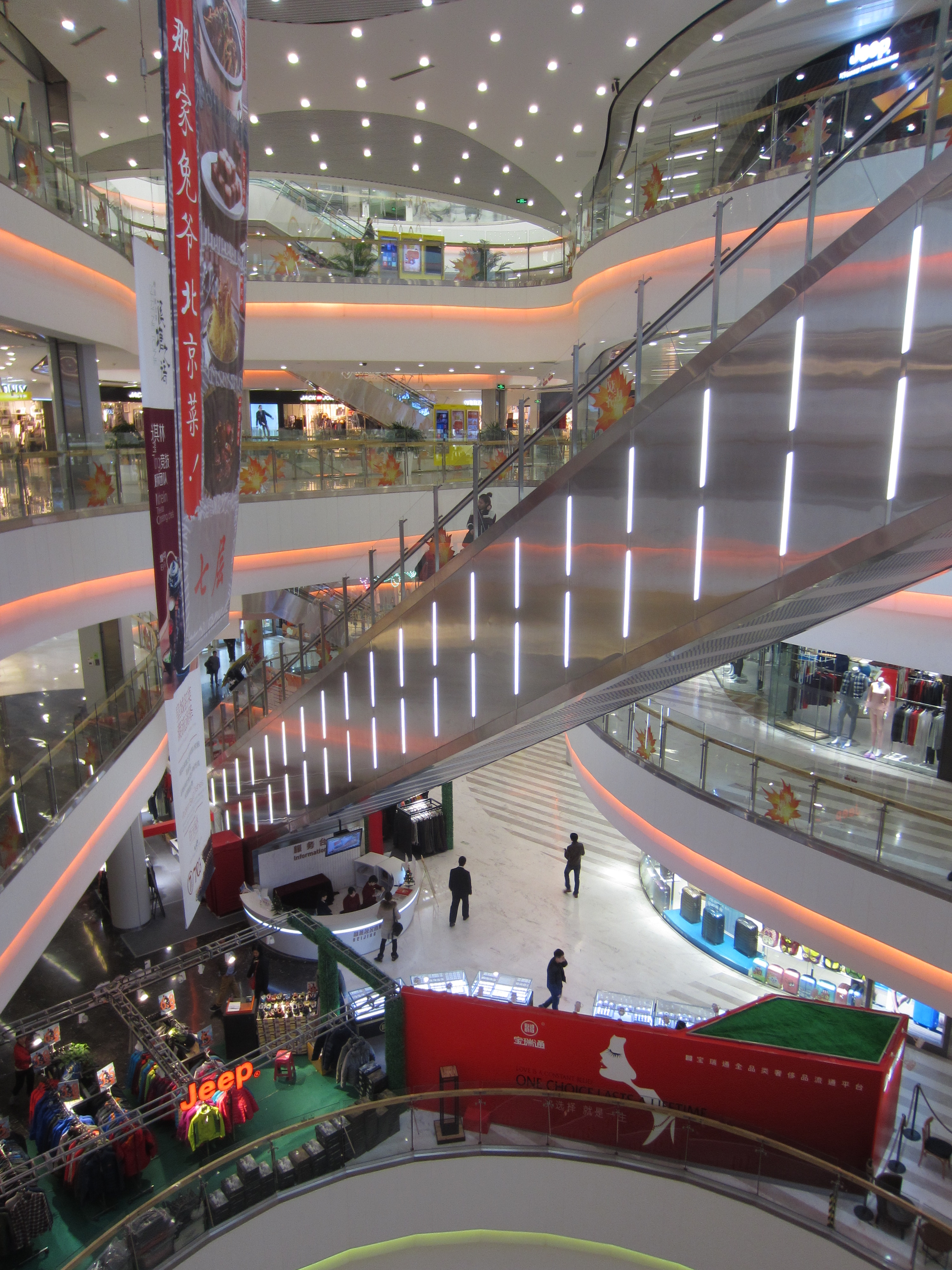
Interior

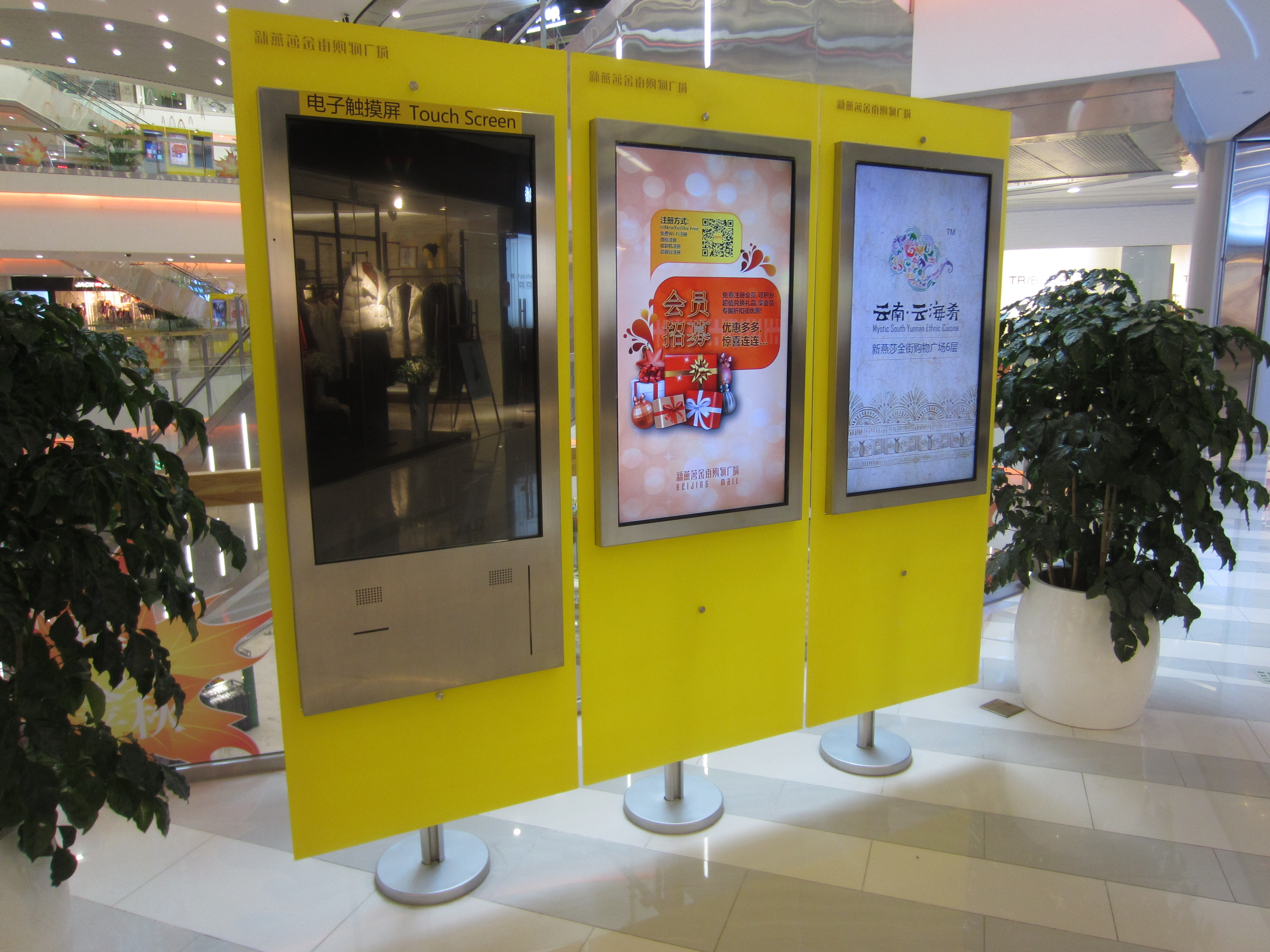
Interior

== See also ==
- Golden Resources Mall, a different mall in Beijing by the same developer
