= Starlight Place =

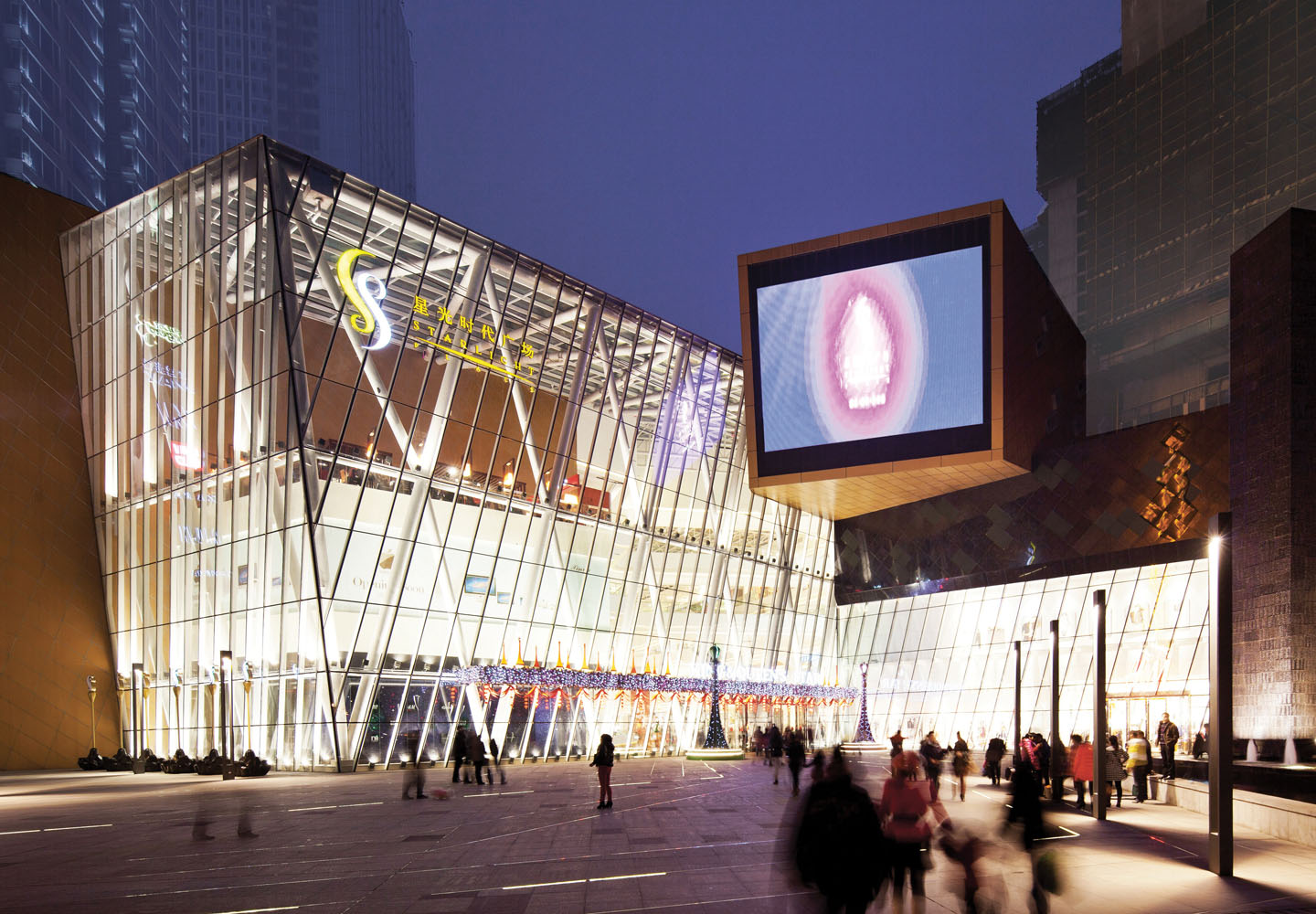
- Interactive map of the Starlight Place area
- Former names: N/A

General information
- Type: Retail
- Location: 28 Jiangnan Avenue, Nan'an District, Chongqing, PRC
- Coordinates: 29.522498°N 106.571283°E
- Completed: 2011
- Owner: Sincere Group
- Management: Sincere Group

Technical details
- Floor count: 10
- Floor area: 135,000 sqm

Design and construction
- Architect: Aedas
- Developer: Sincere Group

Starlight Place is a shopping mall located in Chongqing, People's Republic of China. Designed by the architectural firm Aedas, it officially opened in 2012.

Dominating Jiang Nan Avenue, Starlight Place was designed to become a landmark building that celebrates Nanping district as the southern gateway to the city centre.

Unlike other cities in China, Chongqing has very little direct sunlight and so Starlight Place has a glass atrium skylight to bring natural daylight deep into the public spaces of the shopping mall.

== Tenants ==
Notable tenants include Gucci, CRC Vanguard, H&M, Max & Co., DKNY, Juicy Couture, Armani Jeans, Miss Sixty, Adidas Originals, MUJI, and Jinyi IMAX cinema. It also has several restaurants such as South Beauty. This shopping mall has the largest Apple Retailer and flagship Zara store in Chongqing, as well as the city's very first Costa Coffee. It also has the very first GAP store in the whole of southwest China.

Starlight Place is owned and managed by Sincere.

== Awards ==
Starlight Place was named RLI International Retail and Leisure Destination 2013 at Retail and Leisure International's (RLI) Global RLI Awards 2013 held on 6 June 2013 in London.
