= Beijing apm =

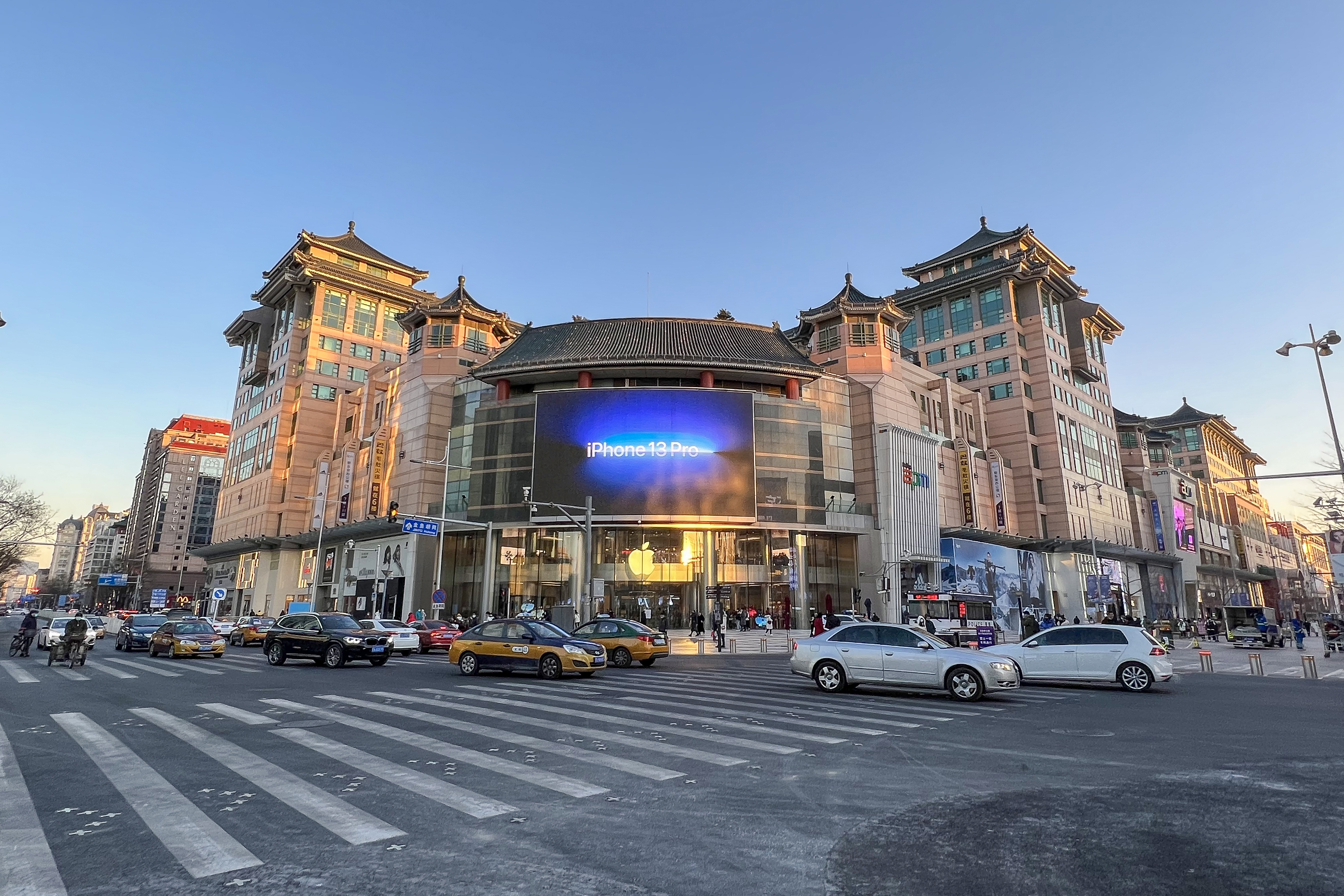
- One of the mall's entrances in 2021
- Location: Wangfujing, Beijing, China
- Coordinates: 39.913696°N 116.405664°E
- Opened: 1993
- Developer: Sun Hung Kai Properties
- Floor area: 120,000 m^{2} (1,300,000 sq ft)
- Floors: 6
- Website: www.beijingapm.cn

Beijing apm, also known as Xindong'an Plaza (Chinese: 新东安广场; pinyin: Xīndōng'ān Guǎngchǎng), is a shopping mall and office building at Wangfujing, Beijing, China. It is a commercial property developed by Sun Hung Kai Properties. It has a total area of 120,000 m^{2} (1,300,000 sq ft).

The building was built on the site of the old Dong'an Department Store, formerly Dong’an Market, and opened in 1998. In 2001, the building was voted as one of Beijing's Top 10 Great Buildings in the 1990s.

The mall is accessible via Jinyu Hutong station on Beijing Subway Line 8 opened in late 2021.

== See also ==
- apm (Hong Kong)
