= Lujiazui =

Locality in Shanghai, China

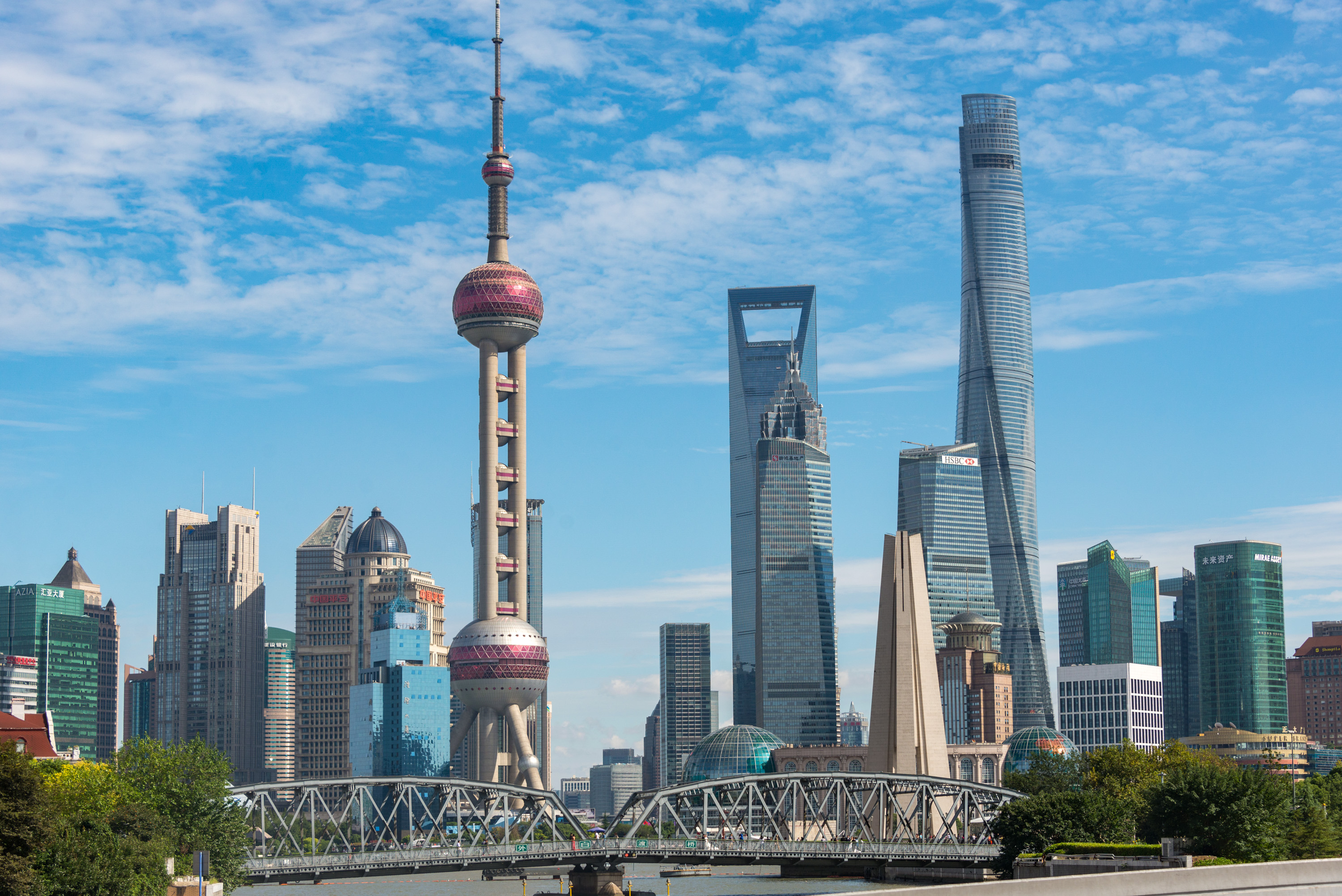
- Skyscrapers in Lujiazui, as seen from Zhapalu Bridge
- Traditional Chinese: 陸家嘴
- Simplified Chinese: 陆家嘴
- Wugniu: loq^{8} ka^{1} tsy^{3}
- Literal meaning: "Cape of the Lu Family"
Transcriptions
Standard Mandarin
- Hanyu Pinyin: Lùjiāzuǐ
Wu
- Wugniu: loq^{8} ka^{1} tsy^{3}
Yue: Cantonese
- Yale Romanization: Luhk gā jéui
- Jyutping: luk^{6} gaa^{1} zeoi^{2}
- IPA: [lʊ̀k ka̋ tsɵ̌y]

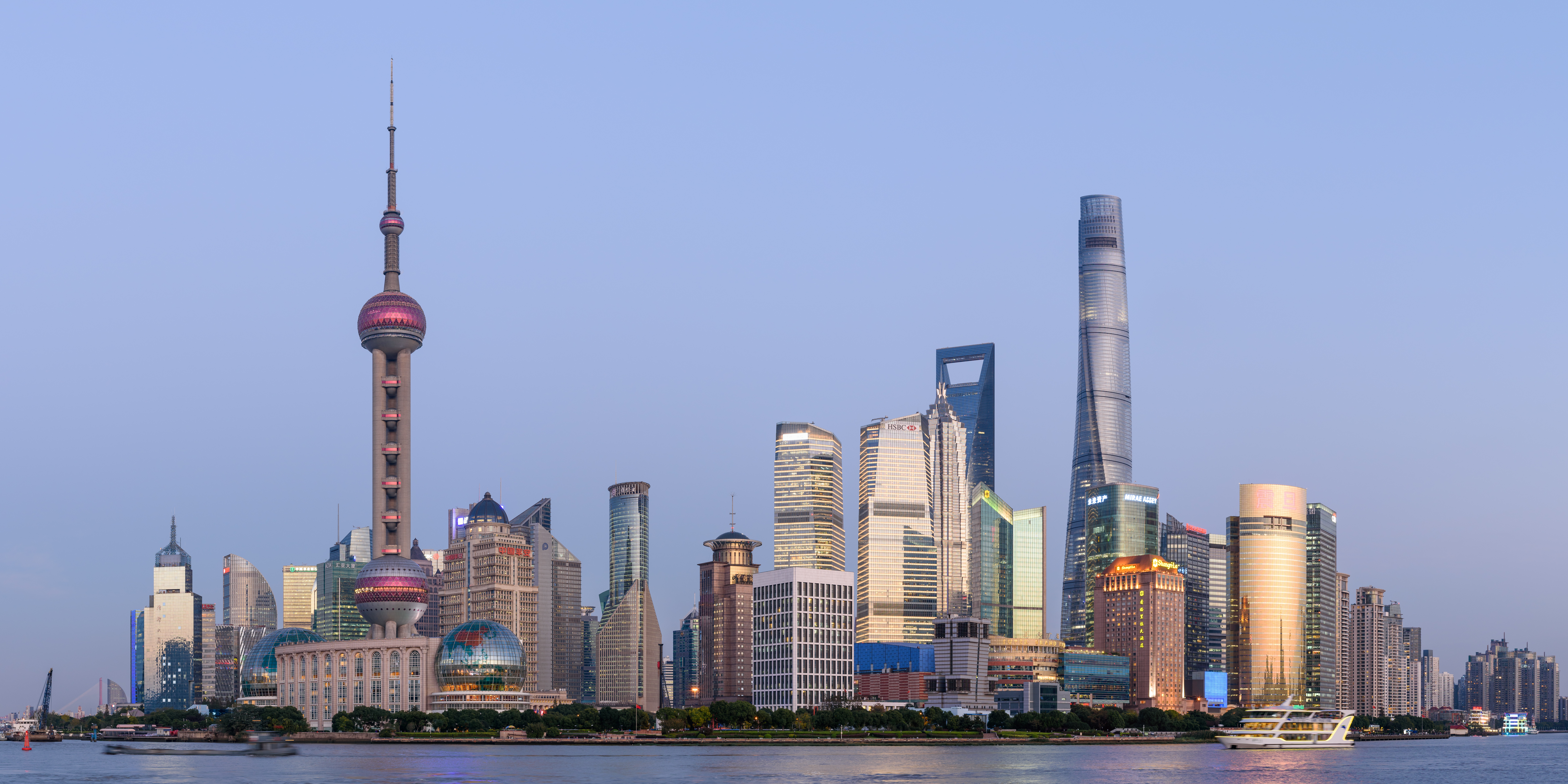
Lujiazui skyline, as seen from the Bund, across the Huangpu River, the tallest building being Shanghai Tower

View of Lujiazui

View of Lujiazui in 2025.

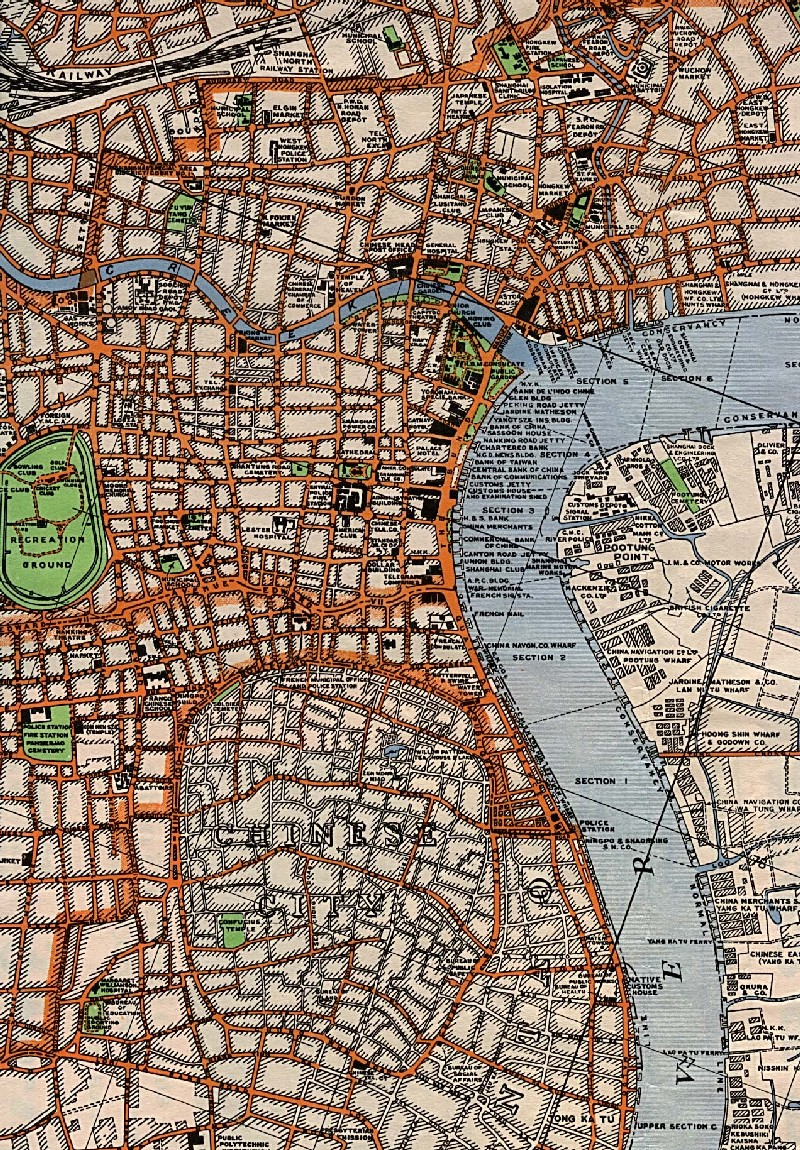
Lujiazui is the light area on the right of this 1933 map, facing the Bund across the river

Lujiazui (simplified Chinese: 陆家嘴; traditional Chinese: 陸家嘴; pinyin: Lùjiāzuǐ; Wugniu: loq-ka-tsy, Wu Chinese pronunciation: [loʔ˩ ka̱˨ t͡sz̩˧]) is a locality in Shanghai, a peninsula formed by a bend in the Huangpu River. Since the early 1990s, Lujiazui has been developed specifically as a new financial district of Shanghai. The decision to earmark Lujiazui for this purpose reflects its location: it is located on the east side of the Huangpu River in Pudong, and sits directly across the river from the old financial and business district of the Bund.

Lujiazui is a national-level development zone designated by the government. In 2005, the State Council reaffirmed the positioning of the 31.78 km^{2} (12.27 sq mi) Lujiazui area as the only finance and trade zone among the 185 state-level development zones in mainland China.

== Geography ==
Lujiazui is located in the Pudong New District on the eastern bank of Huangpu River. It forms a peninsula on a bend of the Huangpu River, which turns from flowing north to flowing east. The importance of Lujiazui stems from the fact that it lies directly across the river from the Bund, the old financial and business district of Shanghai, and just south of the confluence of the Suzhou Creek with the Huangpu River. Until the 1980s, Lujiazui was a relatively low-built area, featuring residential houses, warehouses, and factories. Following the allocation of Lujiazui as a special investment zone in 1992, the development of Lujiazui's skyline began. This was largely driven by Chinese state owned enterprises investing and developing the property within the area, with the inaugural landmark, the Oriental Pearl Tower, being completed in 1994.

== Economy ==
The success of Lujiazui in the past 20 years has fueled tourism and business related travel to Shanghai. Pictures of the Lujiazui skyline dominate Shanghai tourism materials, and there are 5 five-star hotels in the area, providing approximately 2,443 rooms, and three more five-star hotels are expected in the area in the coming years, adding more than 1,200 luxury units.

== History ==
=== Formation ===
The modern configuration of the Huangpu River and Suzhou Creek beyond the old county town of Shanghai is the result of engineering works completed during the early Ming dynasty. The result is that the wider Huangpu River, flowing north past the county town, then turned east at its confluence with the now narrower Suzhou Creek, proceeding along the former downstream channel of the Suzhou Creek to enter the sea at Wusongkou, the former mouth of Suzhou Creek.

The bend in the Huangpu River resulted in the formation of an alluvial beach east and south of the bend. This alluvial floodplain was called a "mouth" (zui) after its shape. It was named after the family of Lu Shen, a 15th-century scholar-official of the Ming dynasty. Lu's family became one of the most prominent in Ming dynasty Shanghai, and lived in the Yangjing canal area, east of the Huangpu River and close to today's Lujiazui.

=== Settlement ===
During the Ming dynasty, fishermen were recorded as living in Lujiazui. During the Qing dynasty, the construction of levees on the peninsula encouraged settlement in greater numbers, with a number of villages forming in the part of the peninsula within the levees. Mudflats remained outside the levees.

The opening of Shanghai as a treaty port in the mid-19th century led to the rapid development of Lujiazui as an industrial and commercial area servicing Shanghai. The middle part of the peninsula became a town called Lannidu (烂泥渡, literally "Mud Ferry"), named after one of the wharves on the river bank. British, American, French, German and Japanese interests built a series of factories, warehouses and storage yards, and wharves to service them. A busy commercial street developed in Lannidu to service the commodities trade as well as the daily needs of the many workers employed by the industrial facilities.

=== Development since 1986 ===
In 1986, as part of reform measures to use Shanghai as a centre for increasing economic development and trade in China, a Chinese government policy document referred to the development of Pudong for the first time, including the creation of a new financial and trading center in Lujiazui. The policy of "developing and opening up Pudong" was officially announced in 1990. Pudong was quickly transformed over the next few decades from its industrial past into a financial and commercial centre. As well as a large number of skyscrapers housing the offices of corporations, banks and professional service firms, the area also features a number of hotels and shopping centres, and a convention centre by the waterfront. The Oriental Pearl Radio & Television Tower has dominated the skyline of Lujiazui since it was completed in 1995, although there are now two skyscrapers taller than it.

In 2015, the Shanghai Free Trade Zone was expanded to include Lujiazui.

== Buildings ==
Landmark buildings in Lujiazui include:

- Oriental Pearl Tower
- Jin Mao Tower
- Shanghai World Financial Center
- Super Brand Mall
- Shanghai IFC
- Bank of China Tower
- Shanghai Tower

== Transportation ==
By water, Lujiazui is linked to the rest of central Shanghai by ferry services from two wharves, located at the northern and southern ends of the area respectively. At the southern end, the Dongchang Road ferry terminal provides river-crossing services across the Huangpu River to central and southern central Shanghai. The most popular ferry service for tourists connects Dongchang Road wharf with Jinling East wharf, located on the Bund. At the north end, the Xichang Inn wharf provides river-crossing services across the Huangpu River to northern central Shanghai. The former Lujiazui ferry wharf, once part of the most popular river crossing in Shanghai, was closed in 1999, with its wharf structure now used as a waterfront seating area.

By road, Lujiazui is connected to the rest of central Shanghai by the Yan'an East Road Tunnel, linking the southern end of the Bund with the centre of Lujiazui. Further away from the centre of Lujiazui, the Renmin Road Tunnel and Fuxing East Road Tunnel link southern Lujiazui with southern central Shanghai, while Xinjian Road Tunnel and Dalian Road Tunnel link northern Lujiazui with northern central Shanghai.

By metro, Lujiazui is served by Lujiazui station, which is on Shanghai Metro Line 2 and Shanghai Metro Line 14.

Additionally, the Bund Sightseeing Tunnel is a tourist attraction consisting of slow-moving underground vehicles which move between the Bund and Lujiazui accompanied by light and sound effects in the tunnel.

== Gallery ==
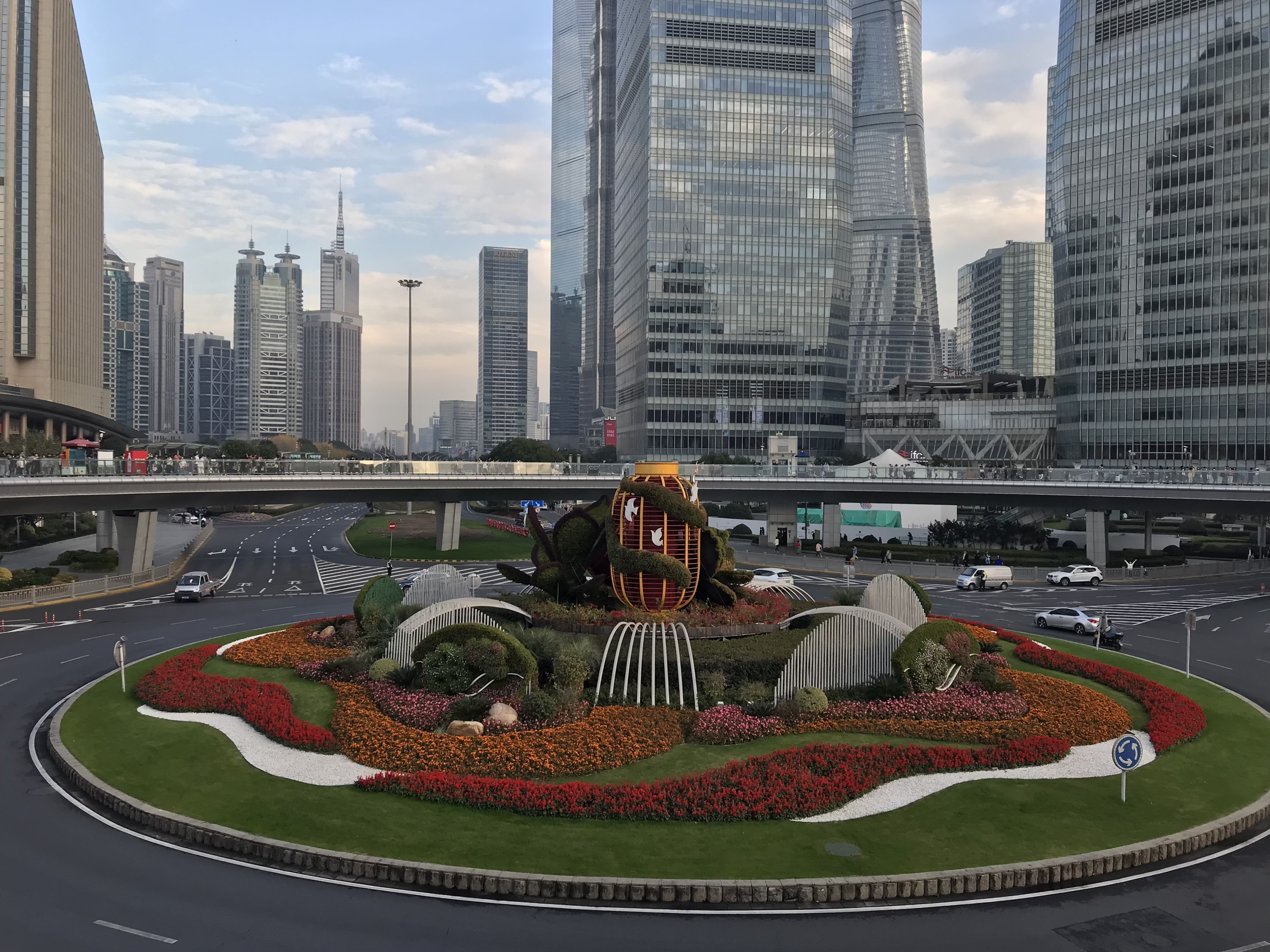
Lujiazui Roundabout in December 2023

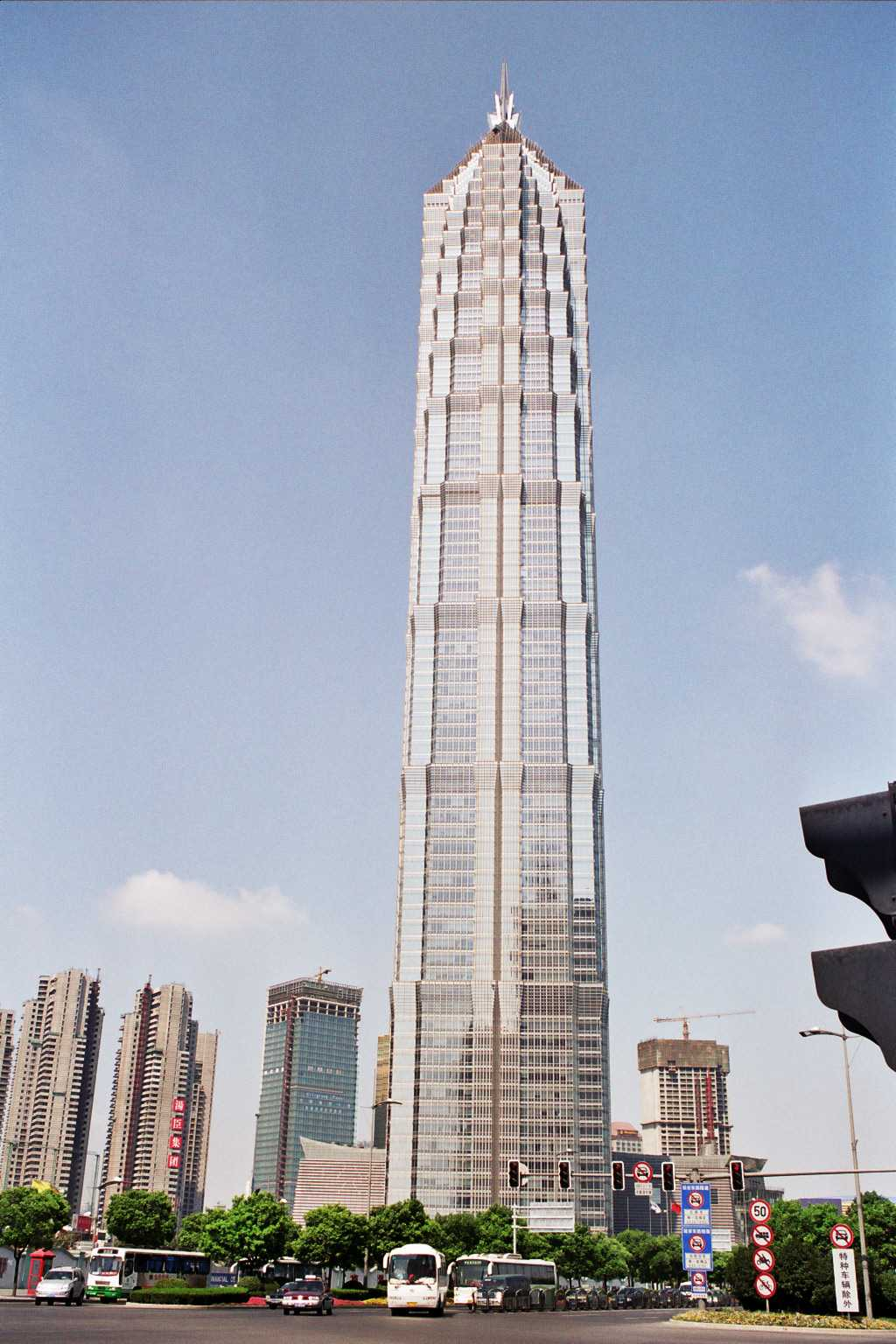
Jin Mao Tower from the Oriental Pearl Tower, with the SWFC under construction in 2005

CITIC Pacific HQ & Mandarin Oriental

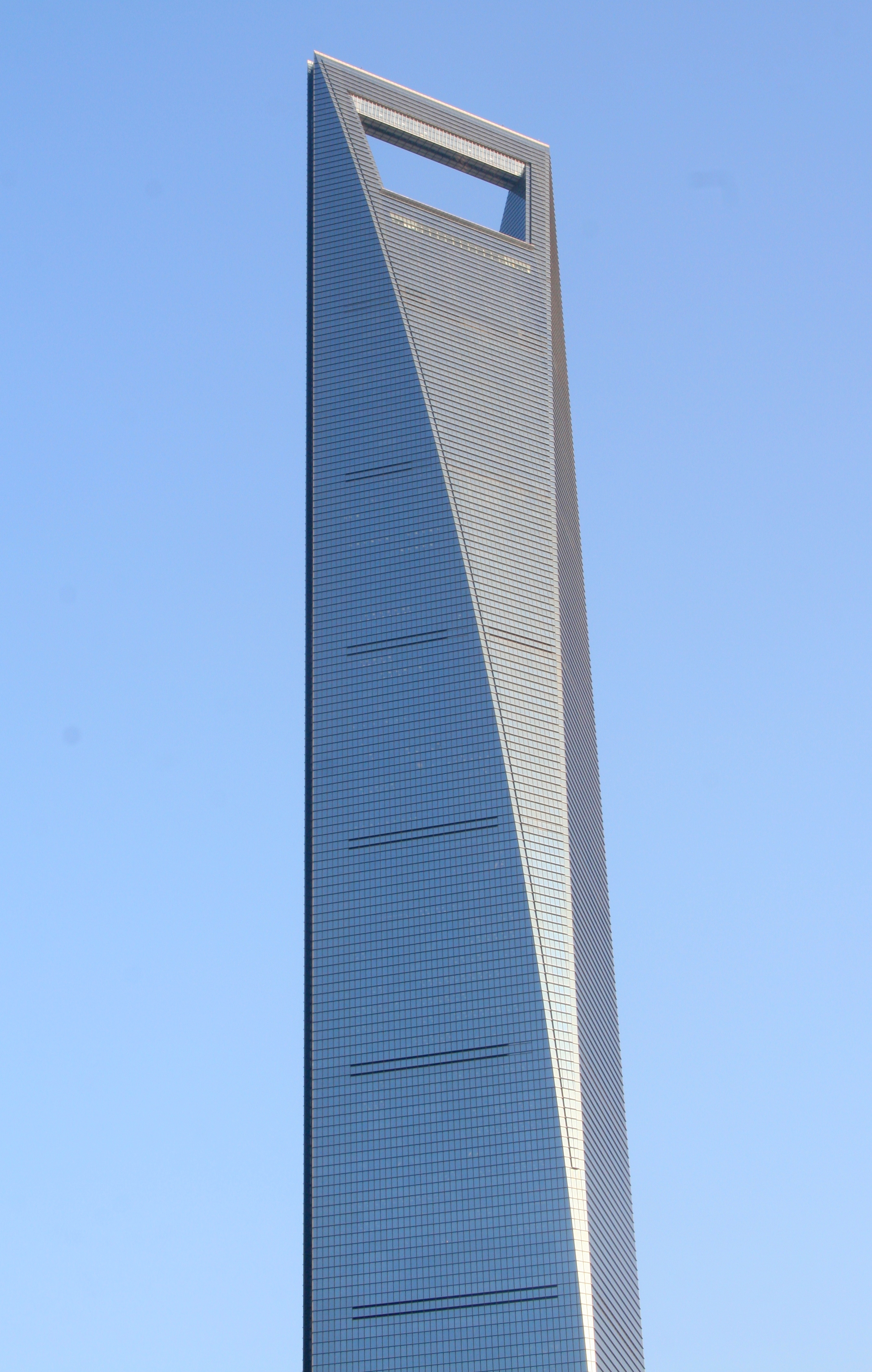
Shanghai World Financial Center

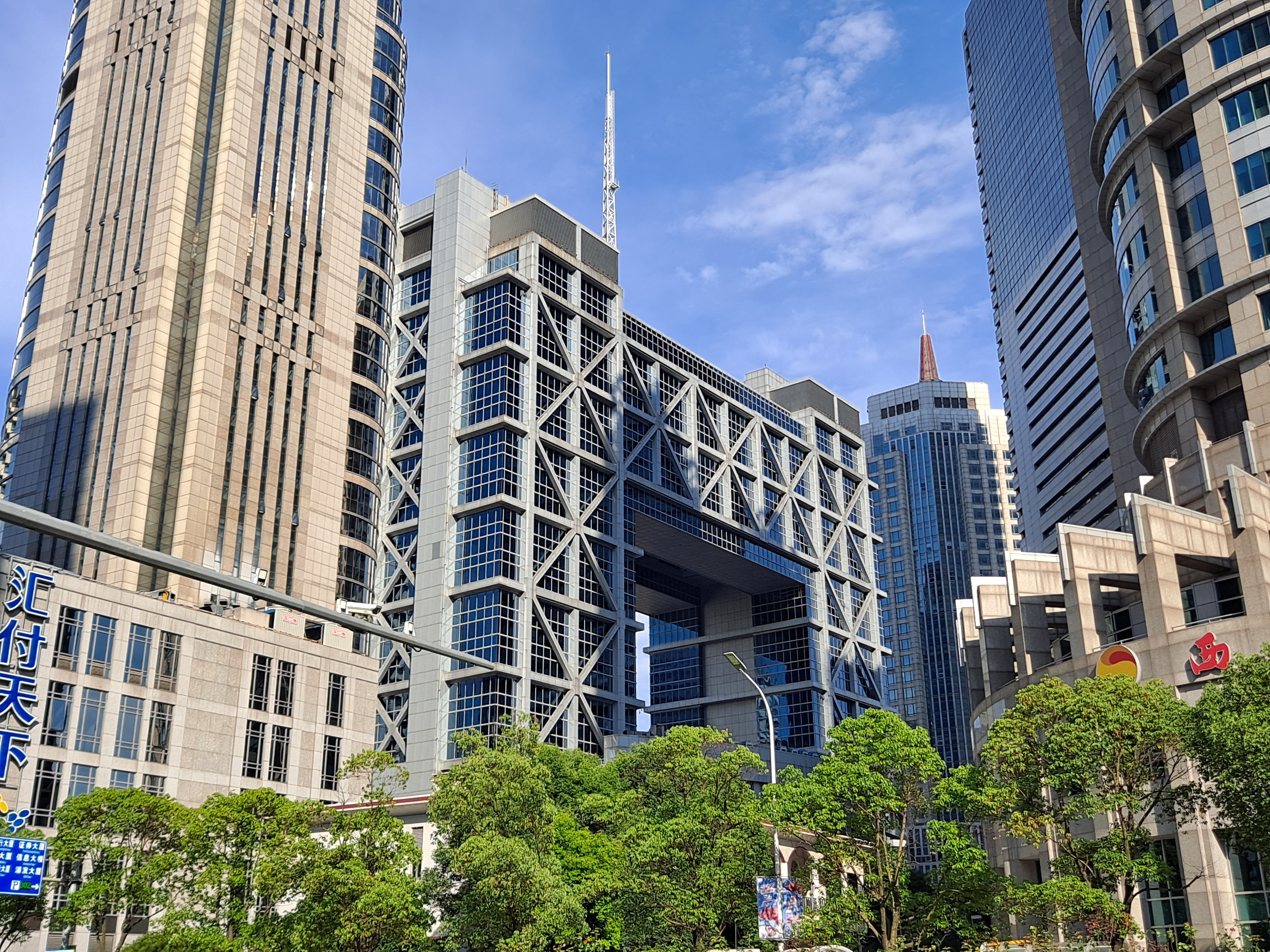
Lujiazui Finance and Trade Zone, Pudong

Lujiazui skyline, Pudong

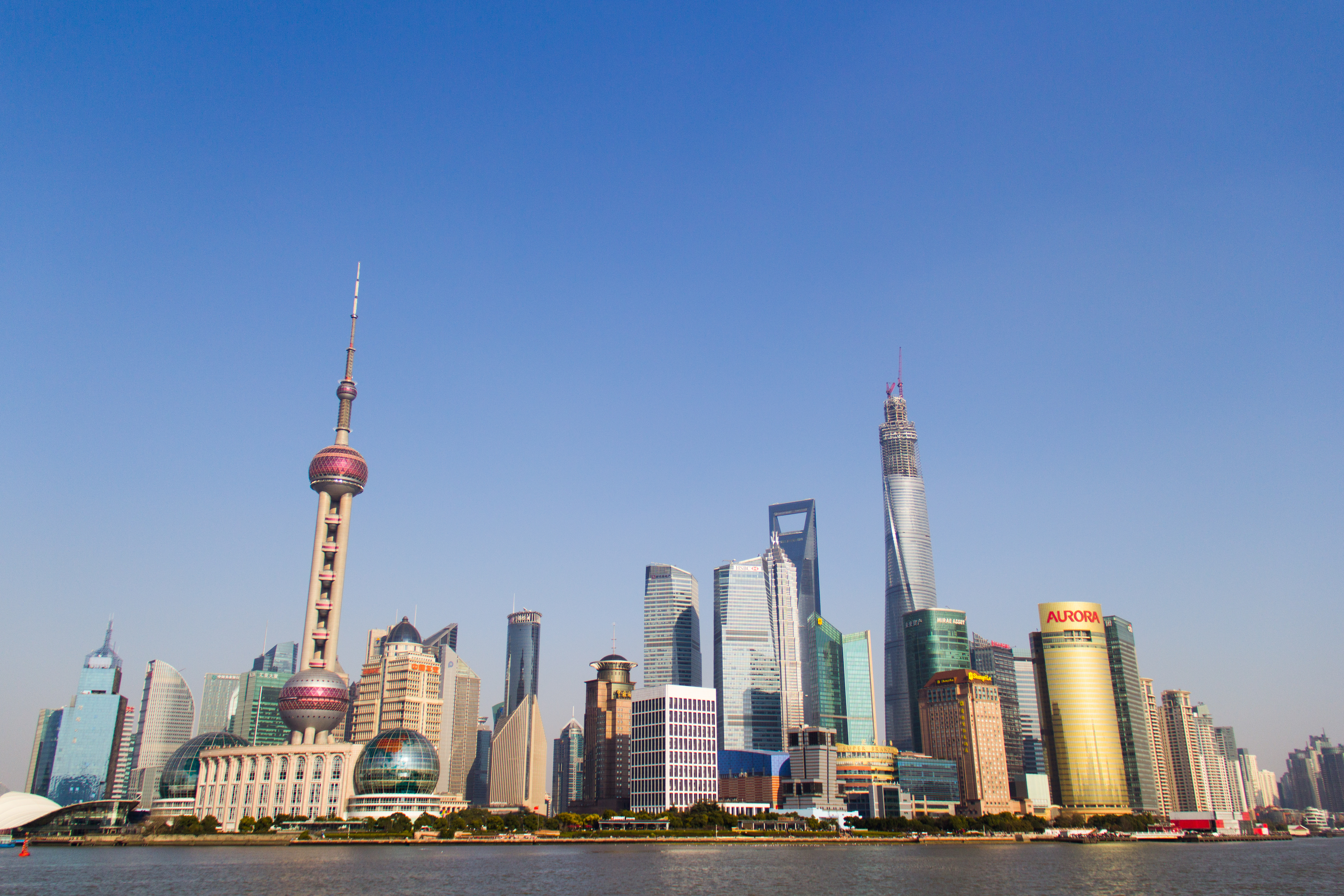
Lujiazui panorama

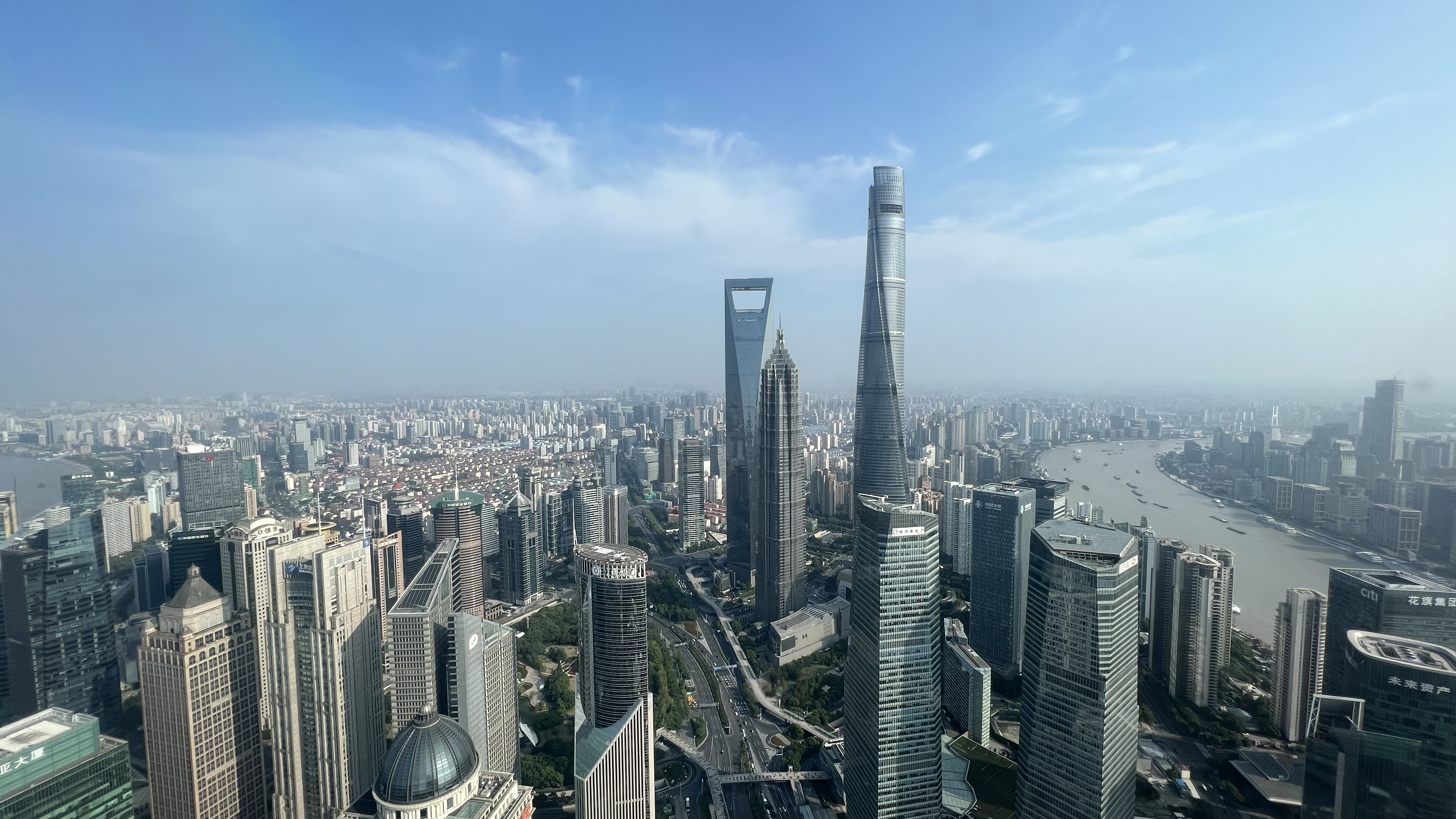
Lujiazui from the Oriental Pearl Tower
