= Li Yong (executive) =

- 李勇

General Manager of the China National Offshore Oil Corporation
- In office September 2020 – December 2023
- Preceded by: Wang Dongjin
- Succeeded by: Zhou Xinhuai

Personal details
- Born: August 1963 (age 63) China
- Party: Chinese Communist Party (expelled in 2024)
- Education: Southwest Petroleum University; Peking University

Li Yong (Chinese: 李勇; pinyin: Lǐ Yǒng; born August 1963) is a former Chinese executive who served as general manager of the China National Offshore Oil Corporation (CNOOC) from 2020 to 2023. As of March 2024, he was under investigation by China's top anti-corruption bodies.

== Early life and education ==
Li was born in August 1963 and graduated from Southwest Petroleum University in 1984. He received an MBA degree from Peking University in 2001.

== Career ==
After graduating university in 1984, Li was assigned to the newly founded China National Offshore Oil Corporation, where he served in several positions, including assistant engineer, engineer, director of the Comprehensive Technology Department and the Drilling Testing Department of the Exploration Department, director of the Drilling and Completion Office, deputy general manager of the Tianjin Branch, executive vice president of CNOOC Oilfield Services Co., Ltd., and president of CNOOC Oilfield Services Co., Ltd. He was promoted to assistant general manager and executive vice president of China National Offshore Oil Corporation in June 2016, while also serving as director and party secretary of the Bohai Oil Management Bureau (Tianjin Branch).

In March 2017, he was transferred to Sinopec and appointed deputy general manager, a position he held for three and a half years.

He returned to China National Offshore Oil Corporation in September 2020 and rose to become vice chairman and general manager, serving in those positions until his retirement in December 2023.

== Downfall ==
On March 15, 2024, Li came under investigation for "serious violations of discipline and laws" by the Central Commission for Discipline Inspection (CCDI), the Chinese Communist Party's internal disciplinary body, and the National Supervisory Commission, the highest anti-corruption agency in China. On September 11, he was stripped of his posts within the CCP and in the public office. On September 27, he was detained by the Supreme People's Procuratorate.

On 13 February 2025, Li was indicted on suspicion of accepting bribes. On April 29, he stood trial at the Intermediate People's Court of Xiangyang on charges of taking bribes, he was accused of abusing his powers in former positions he held between 1996 and 2023 to seek benefits for relevant organizations and individuals in business agency, product sales and job adjustment, in return, he accepted money and gifts worth more than 67.94 million yuan ($9 million) directly or through personnel with whom he had specific relations. On August 5, he was sentenced to 14 years and fined 3 million yuan for taking bribes, all property gained from the bribery would be turned over to the national treasury.

Business positions
Preceded by Wang Dongjin (汪东进)	General Manager of the China National Offshore Oil Corporation; 2020–2023	Succeeded by Zhou Xinhuai (周心怀)
