= Solana Shopping Park =

- SOLANA蓝色港湾
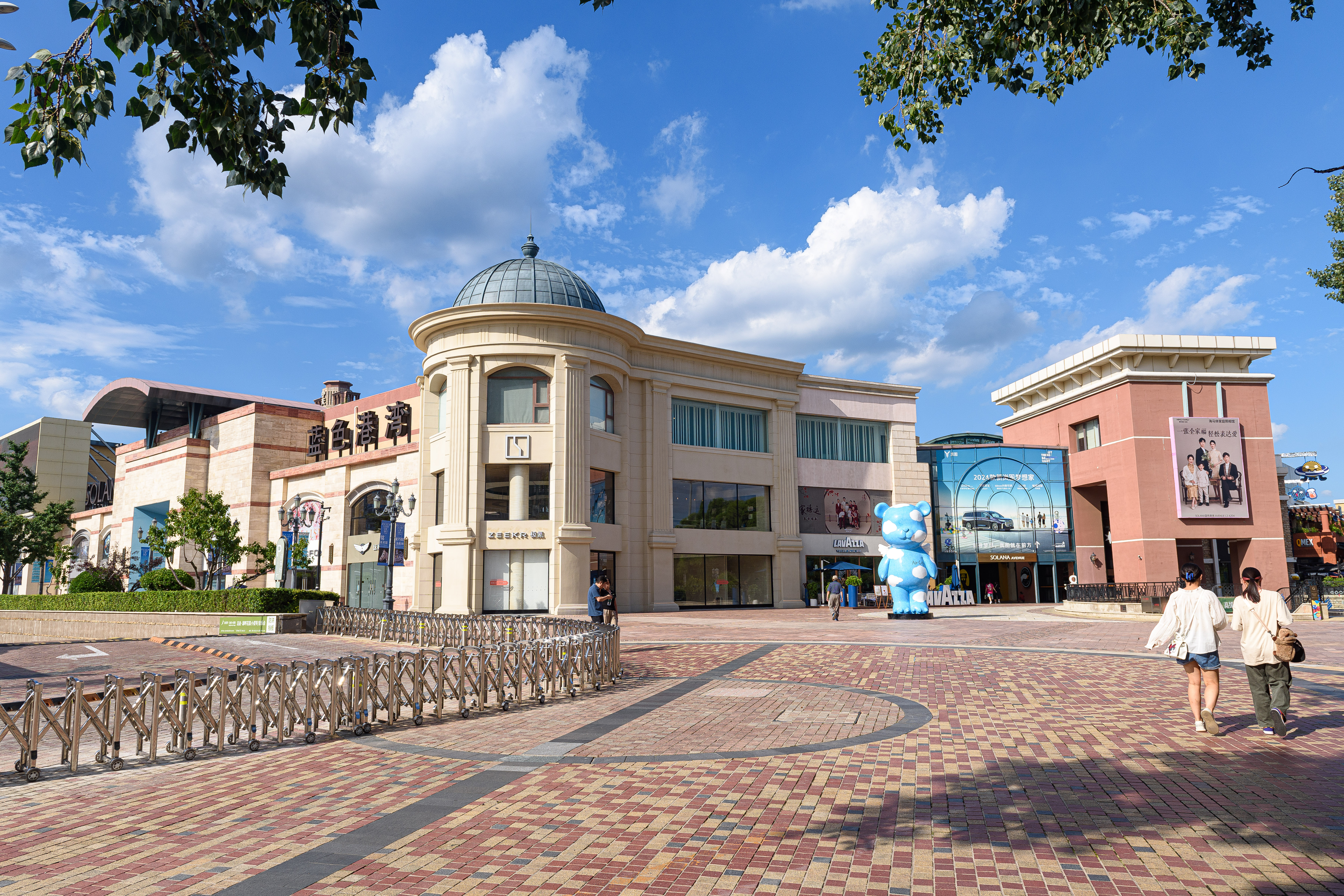
- Coordinates: 39.9490°N 116.4744°E
- Address: 北京市朝阳区朝阳公园路6号
- Opened: December 2008
- Developer: 蓝色港湾有限公司
- Num. of stores: 500
- Website: http://www.solana.com.cn/

Solana Shopping Park (Chinese: SOLANA蓝色港湾; pinyin: SOLANA lán sè gǎngwān) is a large shopping complex in the north west corner of Chaoyang Park in Beijing's Chaoyang District.

The center was opened in December of 2008 and hosts more than 500 retailers and restaurants.

Solana Shopping Park is part of the Blue Harbor Commercial Facilities project, run by Beijing Blue Harbor Real Estate Co., Ltd. The parcel that includes the shopping park was purchased in 2004 for RMB 1.008 billion.
