= The Malls at Oriental Plaza =

Shopping mall in Beijing, China

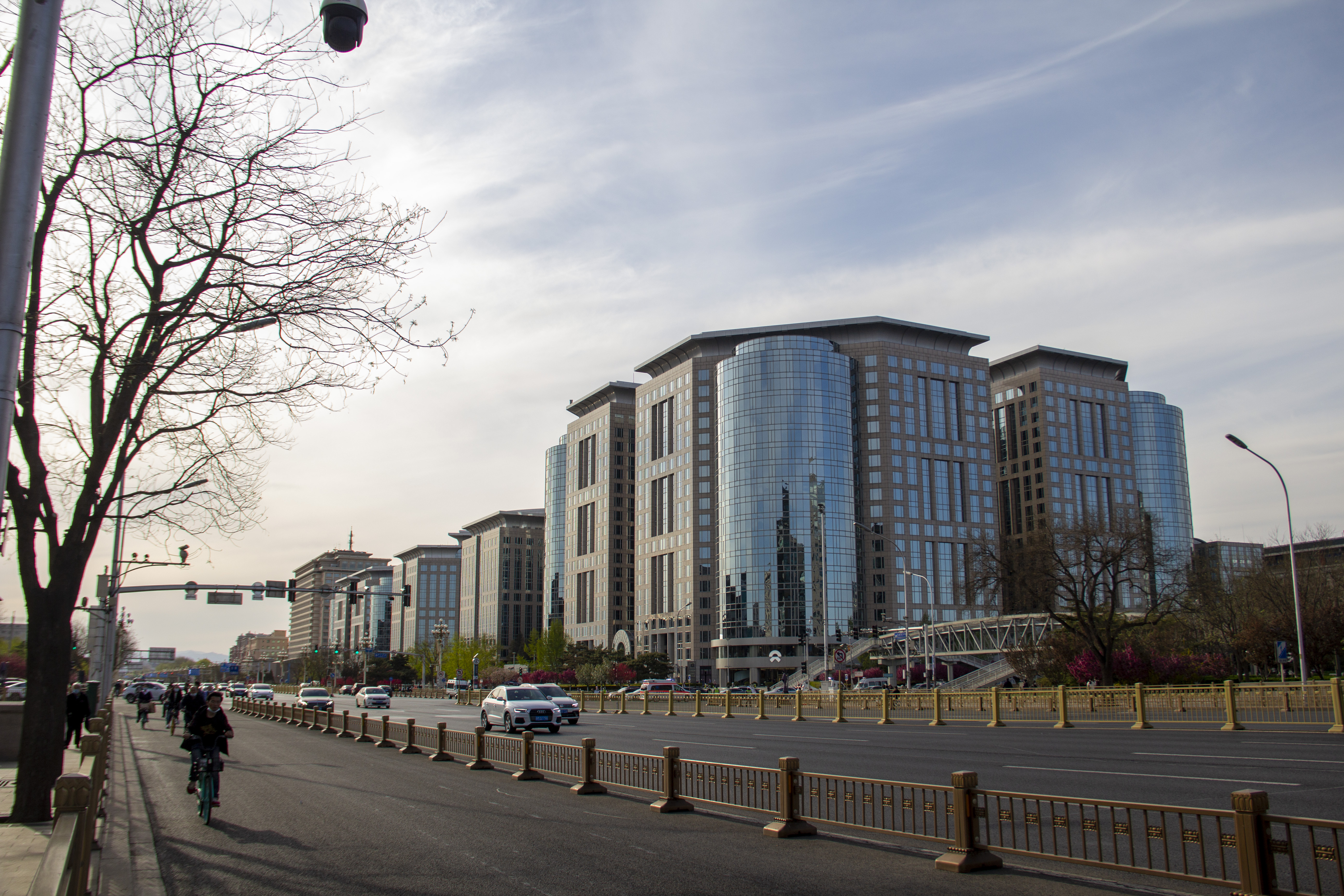
- The Malls at Oriental Plaza in 2021
- Location: Beijing, China
- Floors: 3

The Malls at Oriental Plaza is a shopping mall on Wangfujing in Beijing, China. It has 3 levels and over 300 stores.
