= Eurasia Shopping Mall =

Shopping mall in Changchun, China

Coordinates: 43.838925°N 125.236769°E

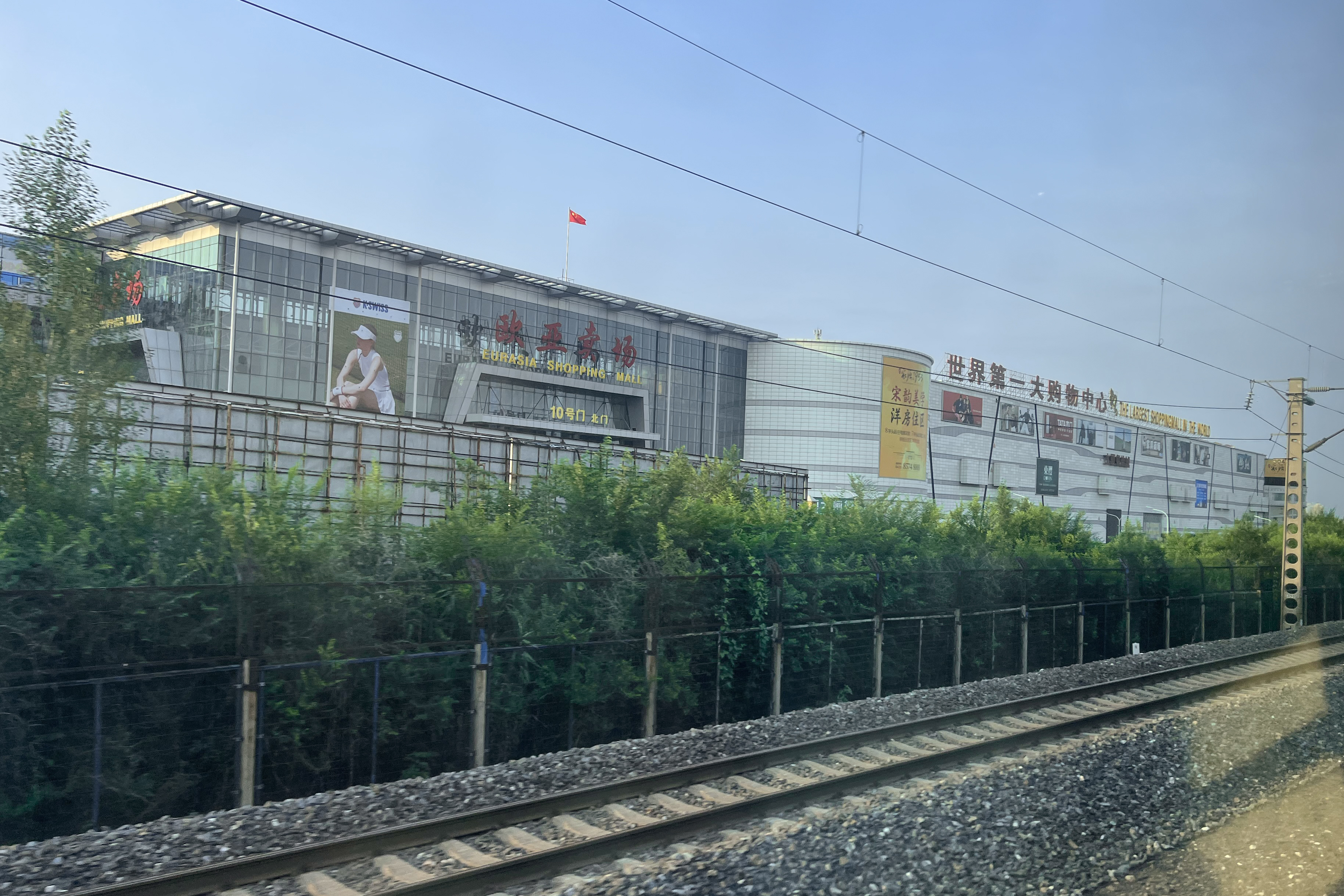
Eurasia Shopping Mall

Eurasia Shopping Mall (simplified Chinese: 欧亚卖场; traditional Chinese: 歐亞賣場; pinyin: Ōuyà Màichǎng) is a shopping mall located in Chaoyang District, Changchun, Jilin province, north-east China. It is allegedly the biggest mall in the world.

It is property of the Changchun Eurasia Group Co., Ltd, founded in 1992, and owner of other five malls in the city, besides other retail businesses.
