= Eurasia Foundation Central Asia =

Publicly funded grant maker

Eurasia Foundation Central Asia is a publicly funded, privately managed grant maker and program implementer working to mobilize public and private resources with the goal of strengthening the ability of organizations and communities in Kazakhstan, the Kyrgyz Republic, Tajikistan, Turkmenistan, and Uzbekistan to represent their social and economic interests and to participate in civil society.

A public-private partnership, EFCA is managed by an international board of trustees and is supported by the U. S. Agency for International Development (USAID), as well as governments, foundations, corporations, intergovernmental organizations, universities, and individuals.

== Local projects ==
The Eurasia Foundation of Central Asia implemented the “Reforming Legal Aid For the Vulnerable in Kazakhstan” project funded by the European Union. The project helped enhance the protection of individual rights of vulnerable people, in particular in the wider criminal and civil justice systems, through improving access to government funded legal aid. The budget of the project was 280,072 EUR.
