= Li Yong (poet) =

Chinese politician, writer, and calligrapher (674–747)

Li Yong (Chinese: 李邕; pinyin: Lǐ Yōng; 674–747), courtesy name Taihe (Chinese: 泰和; pinyin: Tài Hé), also known as Li Beihai (Chinese: 李北海; pinyin: Lǐ Běihǎi), was a Chinese politician, writer, and calligrapher active during the Tang dynasty.

== Early life ==
Li Yong was born in Guangling (廣陵; present-day Yangzhou) in 674. He was the son of scholar Li Shan (李善; fl. 630–689), who had written a commentary on the Wen Xuan.

== Career ==
Li entered the civil service during the Wu Zhou dynasty, when he was appointed by Empress Wu Zetian as a "Zuoshiyi" (左拾遺; "Reminder to the Left") who would review mistakes in court papers. Following a palace coup in 705, which resulted in the restoration of the Tang dynasty and allowed Wu's son Zhongzong to reclaim the throne, Li Yong was promoted to the minor rank of District Magistrate of Nanhe (南和縣令). A few months later, however, he was demoted to Adjutant to the Revenue Manager of Fuzhou (富州司戶參軍事).

In 710, Li joined a coup led by Li Longji against Empress Wei, who had poisoned her spouse Zhongzong. Empress Wei was executed, and the throne was returned to Li Longji's father, Emperor Ruizong of Tang. Li Yong was first promoted to the major office of Left Imperial Censor (左臺殿中侍御史), before becoming the Ministry of Revenue's vice-director (戶部員外郎). However, after Li Longji ascended to the throne, his chancellor Cui Shi advised the new emperor to exile Cui's predecessor, Cui Riyong. Being part of Cui Ruiyong's faction, Li Yong was likewise exiled and demoted to Assistant to the District Magistrate of Shecheng (舍城丞). He was summoned back to the capital in 715 and became a supervisor in the Ministry of Revenue (戶部郎中). Li also briefly served as the chief censor's palace aid (御史中 丞).

Sometime before 721, at Chancellor Yao Chong's direction, Li was again sent out of the capital, this time to Zhejiang, where he became Marshal of Kuozhou (括州司馬). In 725, he was charged with corruption and risked being sentenced to death. Li was ultimately pardoned but was further demoted to District Defender of Zunhua (遵化縣尉). Throughout his political career, Li also served as the governor of several northeastern Tang states, including Kuozhou (括州), Zizhou (淄州), Huazhou (滑州), Jijun (汲郡) and Beihai (北海). After becoming governor of Beihai, Li earned the alias Li Beihai (李北海).

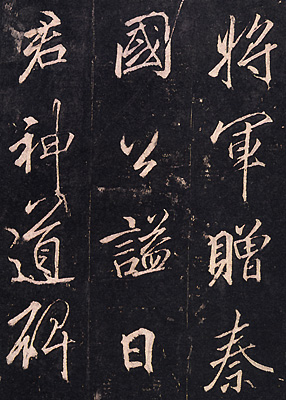
Li Yong's Epitaph of the Yunhui General Li Sixun, after 739.

While in the provinces, Li wrote several obituaries and shendaobei (神道碑; "spirit-road epitaphs"). Li's biography of Chinese Buddhist monk Daoxuan, believed to be the oldest such account, was written in 742 and inscribed on a stele in the Lingyan Monastery on Mount Taishan. Li—who was an early mentor to Du Fu—also penned many poems, including a prose poem on duck fighting and a "most unusual" condemnation of so-called "Bronze Bird Performers" poetry.

In addition, Li was one of the "most sought after writers of monumental calligraphy" of his time. Li's calligraphy was initially modelled on Wang Xizhi's, before he developed "his own personal and innovative style of running script".

== Death ==
In 747, as part of Chancellor Li Linfu's purges, Li was falsely accused of attempting treason. He was found guilty and sentenced to death. According to Li Bai, Li Yong was executed by "flogging with a wooden staff". He was survived by his five-year-old son Xuanyan (玄宴; 742–800), who was fully ordained as a Buddhist monk in 768. The Song dynasty scholar Song Minqiu (宋敏求; 1019–1079), writing in his Chunming tuichao lu (春明退朝錄; Record of Retirement in Chunming), remarks that Li's works were still highly sought after in the late eleventh century. However, many of them are now considered lost. A decade after his execution, Li Bai dedicated a poem to Li Yong:

My kinsman Li Yong's house
is now a temple on the river's southern shore.
No jade tree in the empty courtyard,
holy men sit meditating in the high hall.
Green grass grows in the library,
and white dust covers the zither room.
The peach and plum he planted his whole life
pass into nirvana without attaining spring.
