= List of hotels: Countries C =

This is a list of what are intended to be the notable top hotels by country, five or four star hotels, notable skyscraper landmarks or historic hotels which are covered in multiple reliable publications. It should not be a directory of every hotel in every country:

== Cambodia ==
- Grand Hotel d'Angkor, Siem Reap
- Hotel Cambodiana, Phnom Penh
- Hotel Le Royal, Phnom Penh
- Independence Hotel, Sihanoukville
- InterContinental Phnom Penh, Phnom Penh
- Phnom Penh Hotel, Phnom Penh
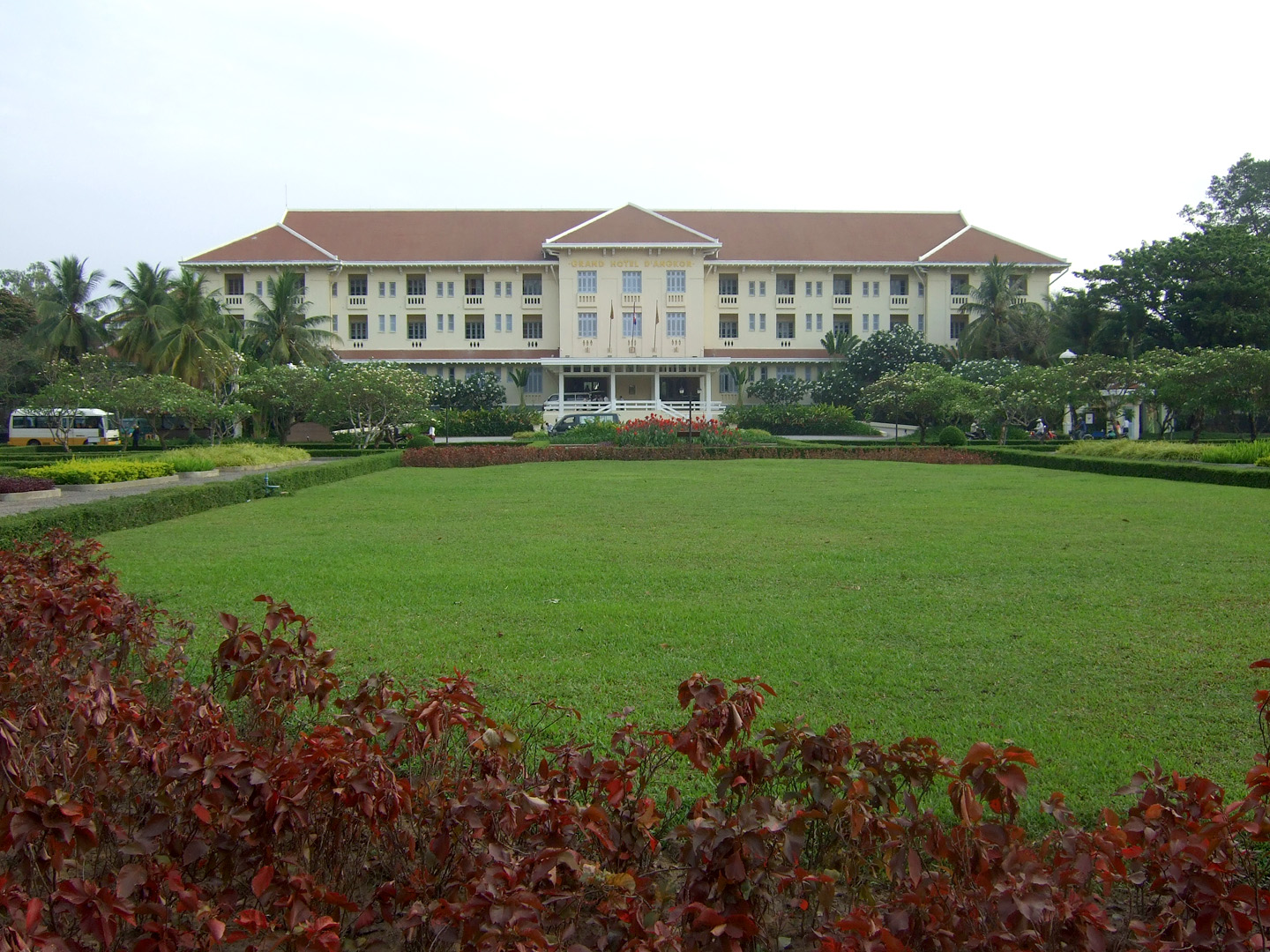
Grand Hotel d'Angkor

Independence Hotel

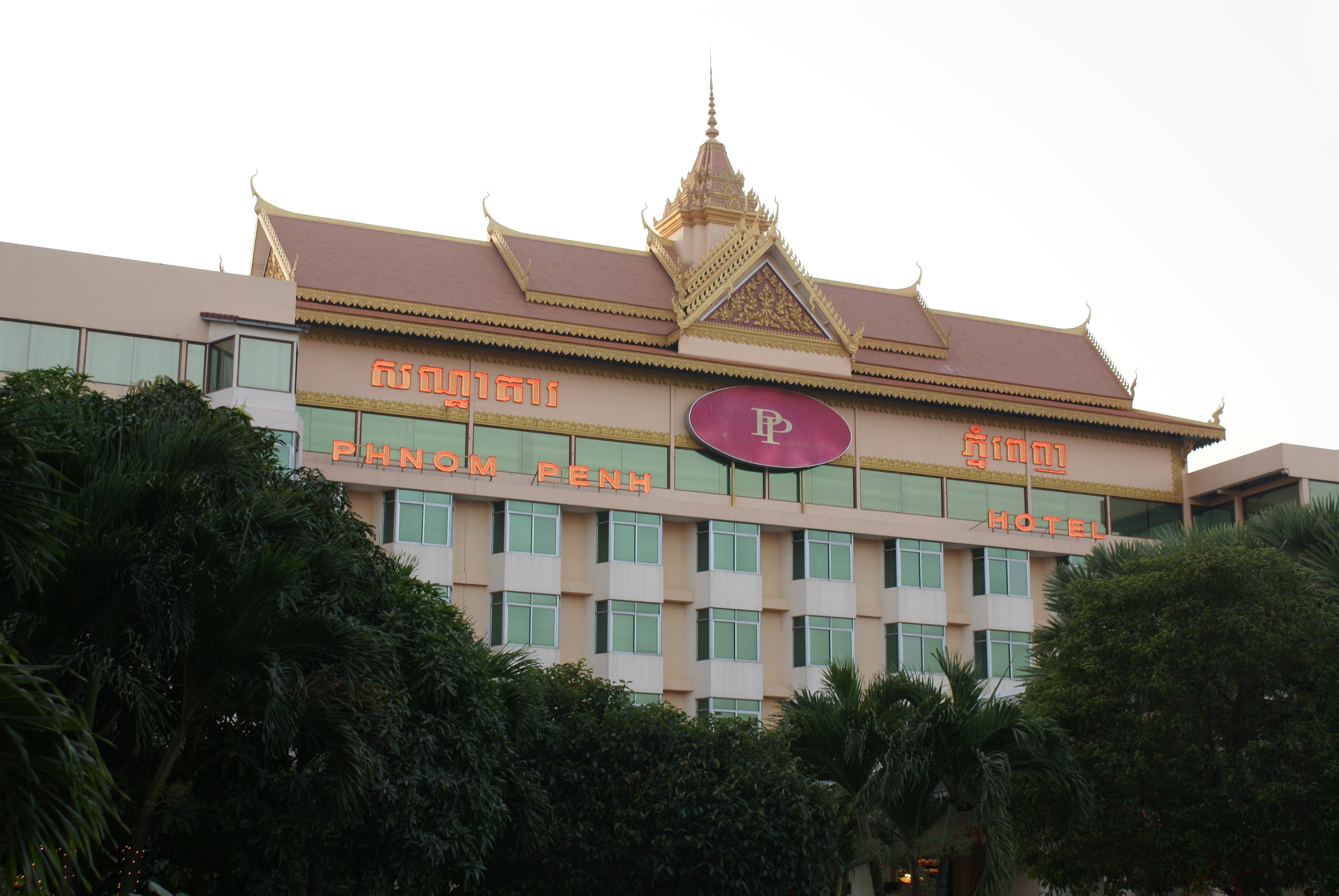
Phnom Penh Hotel

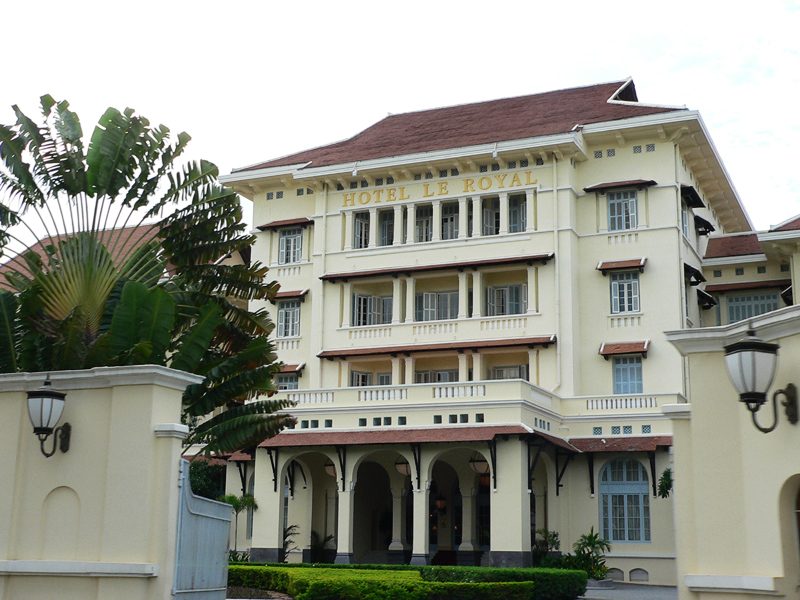
Raffles Hotel Le Royal

== Chad ==
- Kempinski Hotel N'Djamena, N'Djamena

== Chile ==
- Agustín Ross Hotel, Pichilemu
- ESO Hotel, Paranal Observatory
- San Alfonso del Mar Resort, Algarrobo

== China ==
- Astor House Hotel, Shanghai
- Beijing Hotel, Beijing
- Broadway Mansions, Shanghai
- Centre Hotel (Nanjing), Nanjing
- China Hotel, Guangzhou
- Diaoyutai State Guesthouse, Beijing
- East Asia Hotel, Shanghai
- Fairmont Beijing, Beijing
- The Garden Hotel, Guangzhou, Guangzhou
- Grand Hyatt Beijing, Beijing
- Grand Hyatt Shanghai, Shanghai
- Hotel Landmark Canton, Guangzhou
- Jin Jiang Tower, Shanghai
- Jin Mao Tower, Shanghai
- Jinjiang Hotel, Shanghai
- Jinling Hotel, Nanjing
- JW Marriott Shanghai, Shanghai
- Lhasa Hotel, Lhasa
- Lusongyuan Hotel, Beijing
- Minzu Hotel, Beijing
- Morgan Plaza, Beijing
- Park Hotel Shanghai, Shanghai
- Peace Hotel, Shanghai
- The PuLi Hotel and Spa, Shanghai
- Shimao Wonderland Intercontinental, Songjiang
- St. Regis Shanghai Hotel, Shanghai
- URBN hotels Shanghai, Shanghai
- White Swan Hotel, Guangzhou

== Costa Rica ==
- Gran Hotel, San José

== Croatia ==
- Regent Esplanade, Zagreb

== Cuba ==
- El Senador, Cayo Coco
- Hotel Ambos Mundos, Havana
- Hotel Capri, Havana
- Hotel Habana Riviera, Havana
- Hotel Inglaterra, Havana
- Hotel Nacional de Cuba, Havana
- Hotel Tryp Habana Libre, Havana
- Meliá Cohiba Hotel, Havana
- Sevilla Hotel, Havana

== Curaçao ==
- Dreams Curaçao Resort
- Plaza Hotel Curaçao

== Czech Republic ==
- Berštejn Castle, Dubá
- Four Seasons Hotel, Prague
- Grandhotel Pupp, Karlovy Vary
- Hilton Prague, Prague
- Hotel Crowne Plaza Prague, Prague
- Hotel InterContinental Prague, Prague
- Hotel International, Brno
- Hotel Paris, Prague
