= Jin Mao =

Jin Mao may refer to:

- Jin Mao Tower
- Jin Mao (deputy commander), Deputy Commander-in-Chief of the People's Liberation Army Navy
