= The Westin Nova Scotian =

Coordinates: 44°38′24.5″N 63°34′6.5″W

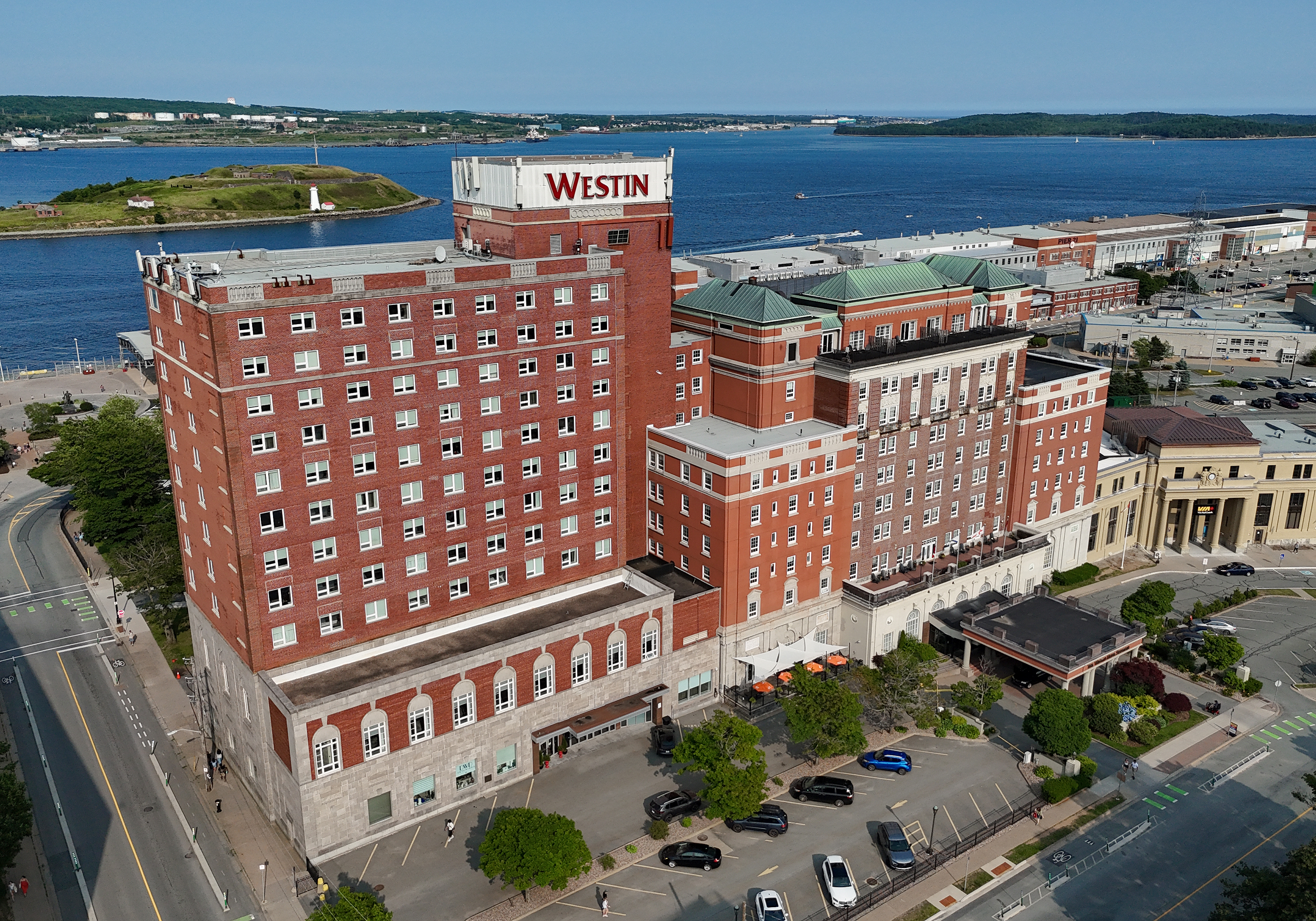
- Western facade of the hotel in 2025
- Interactive map of the The Westin Nova Scotian area
- Former names: Hotel Nova Scotian

General information
- Type: Hotel
- Location: 1181 Hollis Street; Halifax, Nova Scotia; B3H 2P6
- Construction started: 1928
- Opened: 1930
- Owner: New Castle Hotels and Resorts
- Affiliation: Westin Hotels & Resorts

Technical details
- Floor count: 15

Design and construction
- Architect: Archibald and Schofield
- Developer: Canadian National Hotels

Other information
- Number of rooms: 310 (including suites)
- Number of suites: 10

Website
- thewestinnovascotian.com

The Westin Nova Scotian is a Canadian hotel located in Halifax, Nova Scotia, owned and operated by New Castle Hotels and Resorts. It was built in 1928 by the Canadian National Railway as the Nova Scotian Hotel and after several changes of owners and names in the late 20th century became the Westin Nova Scotian in 1996.

The hotel has been called Halifax's "grande dame" and has played host to numerous dignitaries, royalty, and celebrities over 85 years of existence.

== History ==
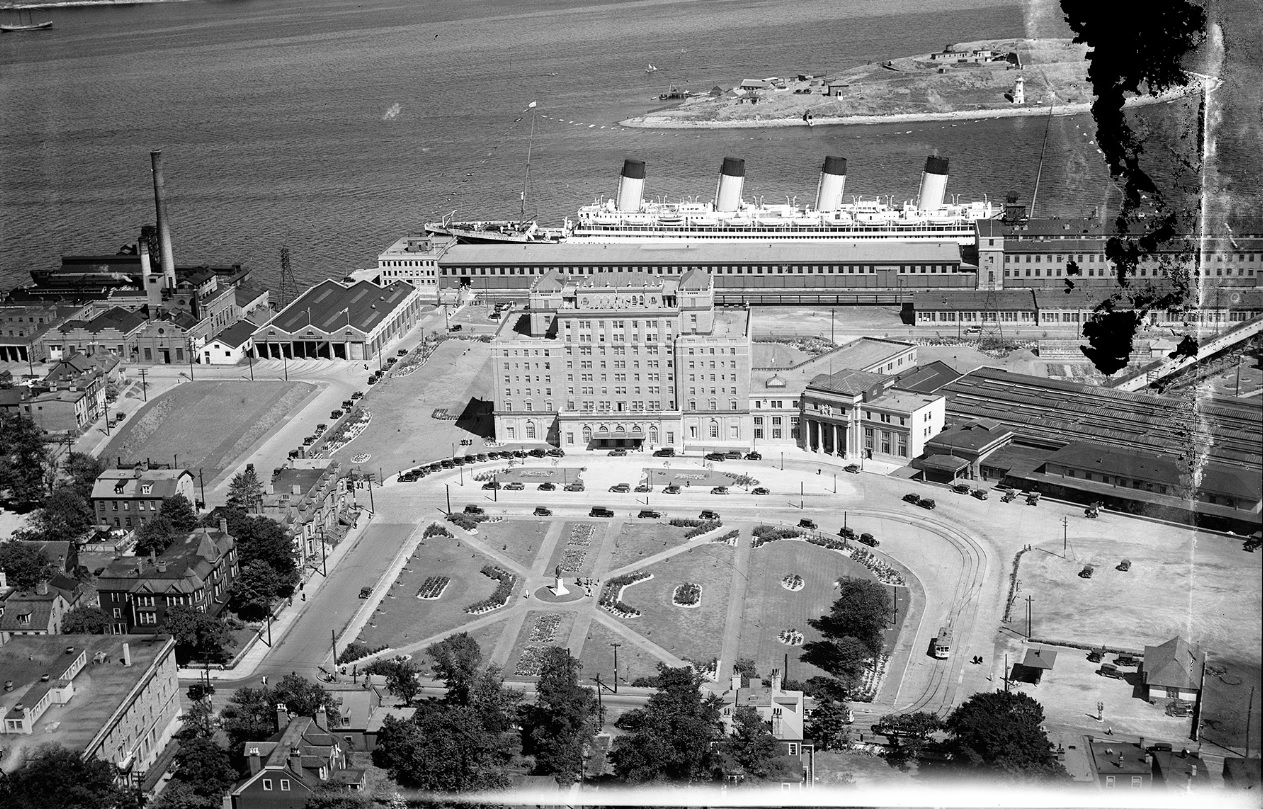
RMS Olympic docked behind the Nova Scotian Hotel in 1931

The hotel was built by the Canadian National Railways. Construction began in 1928 and it opened on 23 June 1930 as the Nova Scotian Hotel. The hotel was the final part of the South End terminal project which had seen the new Halifax Railway Station moved from the north end to the south end of Barrington Street as well as the opening of the Halifax Ocean Terminal, which included Pier 21, a trans-Atlantic Ocean liner passenger terminal. The hotel was directly connected by an interior walkway to the Halifax Railway Station and by an overhead walkway to Pier 21.

The hotel, like others opened by Canadian National Hotels, was designed by Archibald and Schofield, comprising the Canadian architects John Smith Archibald and John Schofield. It was designed as a complex with the Halifax railway station and the Cornwallis Park across the street. The central axis of the park is aligned with the front entrance of the Nova Scotian. The hotel had 130 rooms and five suites over eight storeys. The Atlantic Ballroom could accommodate up to 275 dinner guests. In 1933 the ballroom held host to the largest fraternity gathering in the city for the chartering of local fraternity Delta Tau to a Sigma Chi fraternity's Gamma Rho chapter. A new wing was built to the north in 1959, adding 161 more rooms including nine more suites. In 1966, the name was changed to the Hotel Nova Scotian.

Elizabeth II, Queen of Canada has stayed in the hotel twice, once in the 1950s and once in the 1970s. Prince Charles and Princess Diana attended a state dinner on 15 June 1983 at the Hotel Nova Scotian hosted by Prime Minister Pierre Trudeau. The 700 guests enjoyed a dinner of Canadian wines and cuisine and Trudeau told the Royal couple they had begun their visit in "the most friendly part of Canada." A crowd of thousands grew outside the hotel hoping to catch a glimpse of the couple before they returned to the HMY Britannia for their departure from Halifax.

The hotel was sold by Canadian National Hotels in 1981 when that chain divested all of its properties in the early 1980s. It was purchased by Revenue Hotels and in 1989 Hilton Hotels took over management and the name changed to the Halifax Hilton. Hilton invested $15 million to upgrade the hotel.

Revenue Hotels sought to turn the hotel into a casino, but the bid failed. They closed the hotel in 1993, and the building was used as a temporary dormitory by Saint Mary's University for several years after a student residence underwent emergency repairs due to an unstable wall.

A company was hired to demolish the hotel. It was saved when the property was purchased, in April 1996, by New Castle Hotels and Resorts of Connecticut. The hotel was reportedly only a week away from demolition. An additional $4 million was put into renovating the hotel and it reopened on 1 December 1996 as The Westin Nova Scotian.

The hotel is the venue for the annual Halifax International Security Forum held in November.

== Design ==
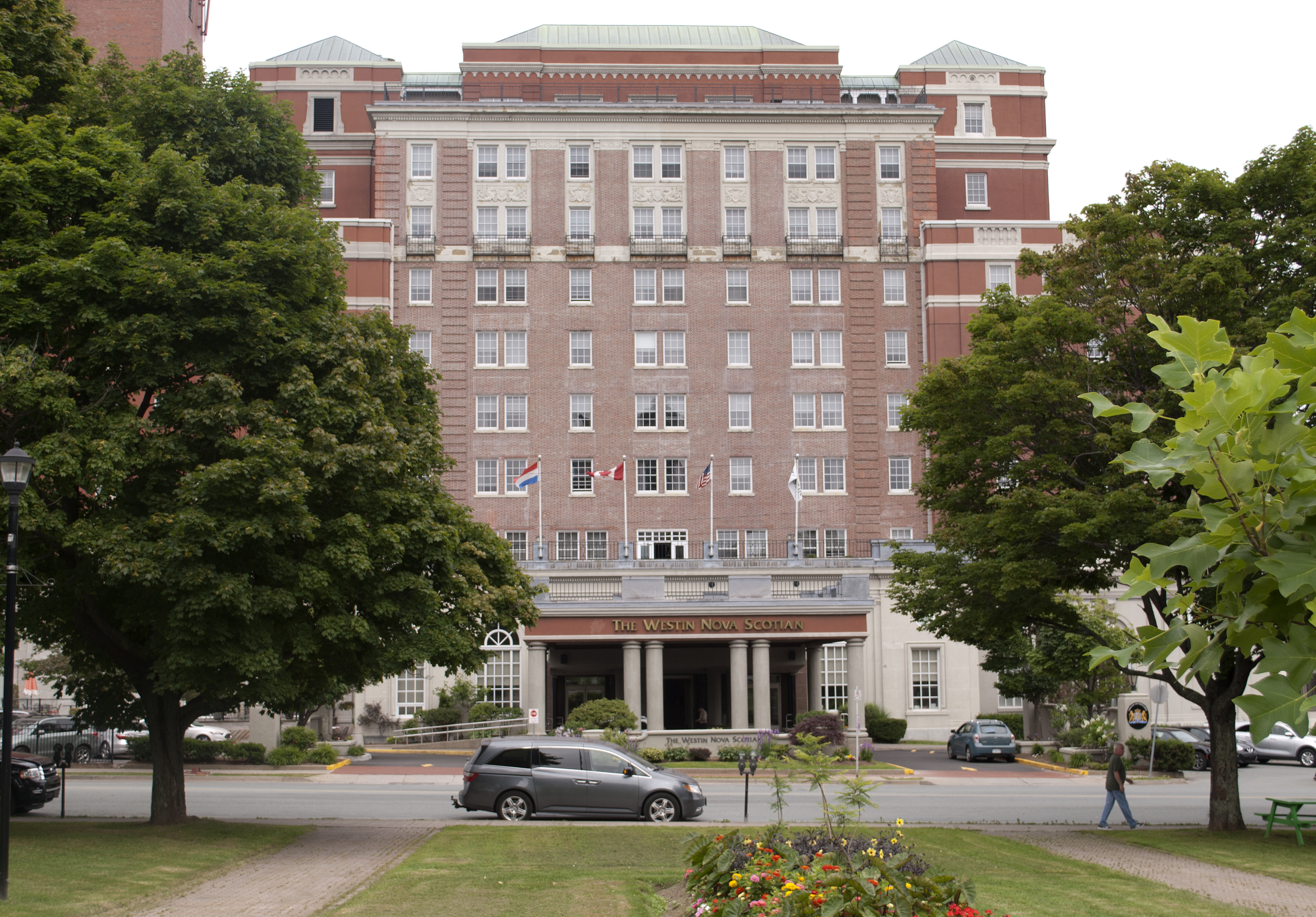
Entrance of the Westin Nova Scotian from Peace and Friendship Park, a public park west of the hotel

The hotel today is a historic 15-storey structure overlooking Peace and Friendship Park (formerly Cornwallis Park) to the west and the seaport to the east. Cruise ships still regularly dock alongside the hotel and the adjacent railway station still offers regular service to Montreal via the Ocean. There are now 310 rooms in the hotel, including 10 suites. The Crown Suite, on the 11th floor, offers sweeping views of Halifax Harbour and is where Elizabeth II stayed in the past.

The hotel is home to 23,000 square feet (2,100 m^{2}) of space for meetings, conferences, and weddings. A restaurant, Seaport Social, is located onsite. The hotel also houses a fitness centre, an indoor saltwater pool, and a business centre.

The area surrounding the hotel has become thoroughly modernized in recent decades. The old coal-fired power station across the street was recently renovated to serve as the corporate headquarters of Nova Scotia Power, and is the first LEED platinum-certified building in Atlantic Canada. The seaport district is now home to the Halifax Farmers' Market, the Canadian Museum of Immigration, and NSCAD University – in addition to the cruise ship terminal.

== See also ==
- Architecture of Canada
- List of hotels in Canada
