= Roland "Slim" Simpson =

Australian BASE jumper (1969–2004)

Roland Simpson (1969 – 22 October 2004) was a BASE jumper with over 1,000 jumps. He was born in Australia in 1969. He was a qualified tandem master and a wingsuit instructor. He became the US national exit style champion in 1998, and the US national champion in 1999.

== BASE life ==
Since 1993 he was well known as a BASE jumper. He won many awards and made many successful leaps, including a jump from Petronas Twin Towers in Malaysia, Troll Wall in Norway, and the Cave of the Swallows in Mexico. He even participated in making the world's record in jumping from fixed objects on 3 July 2004, when 30 jumpers leapt at the same time.

On 25 April 2001 in Garie Beach (Australia), he had a serious accident in which he was badly injured. His injuries were three broken vertebrae, two broken femurs, a broken collarbone, a punctured lung, and a smashed pelvis. A year after the accident, he returned to the sport. He was always active in BASE jumping.

=== Fatal injuries from last BASE jump ===
Roland Simpson's death

On 5 October 2004 during Chinese National Day Holiday, a multi-national group of BASE jumpers who were invited by the Shanghai Sports Bureau leapt from the top of the tower. The next day, Roland Simpson leapt from the Jin Mao Building, the tallest skyscraper in China at the time, in a wingsuit. After a good jump and flight, his parachute opened with multiple line twists making it difficult to steer and he crashed onto an adjacent building. He went into a coma. He was then returned to Australia, where he died from his injuries in Canberra Hospital at 2:30pm AEST on 22 October 2004. He is number 85 on the BASE Fatality List.
