= Tomorrow Square =

Skyscraper in Shanghai, China

- 明天广场
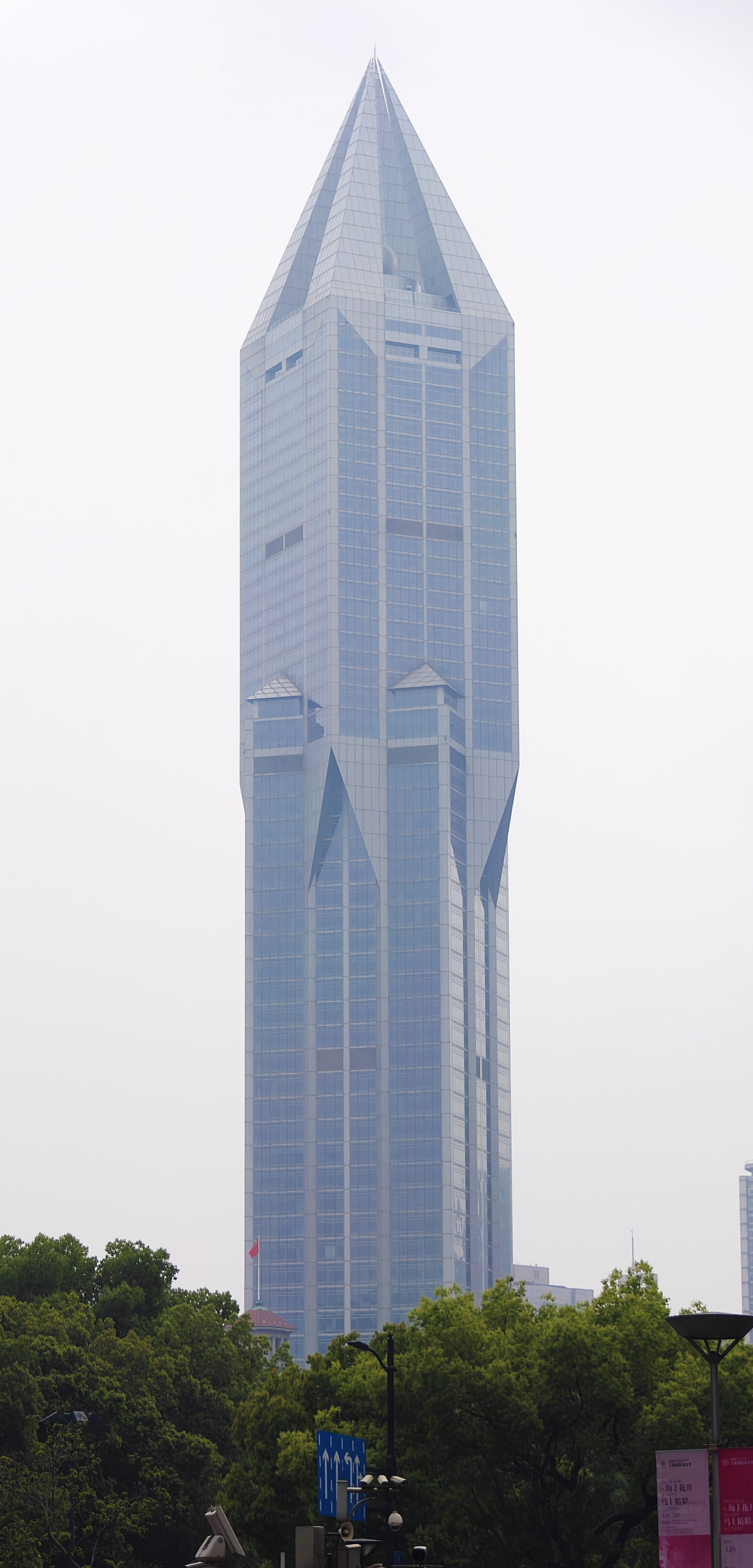
- Tomorrow Square in April 2026
- Interactive map of the Tomorrow Square area

General information
- Status: Completed
- Type: Office, hotel, restaurant, apartments
- Location: Huangpu District, Shanghai, China
- Coordinates: 31.232°N 121.465°E
- Construction started: 1997
- Completed: 2003

Height
- Antenna spire: 285 m (935 ft)
- Roof: 238 m (781 ft)

Technical details
- Floor count: 63
- Floor area: 130,063 m^{2} (1,399,990 sq ft)
- Lifts/elevators: 15

Design and construction
- Architects: John Portman & Associates

Website
- JW Marriott Shanghai

Tomorrow Square (simplified Chinese: 明天广场; traditional Chinese: 明天廣場; pinyin: Míngtiān Guǎngchǎng) is the twelfth-tallest building in Shanghai, China. It is located in Huangpu District, Puxi, close to People's Square. It is about 285 m (934 ft) tall and has 55 floors.

This multi-purpose building contains a 342-room JW Marriott hotel, and 255 executive apartment units. The base includes a conference center, shopping center, and subway access. It was completed on 1 October 2003. The hotel's foyer is on the 38th floor. The building holds the record for the highest library in a building in the world, located on the 60th floor.

Architecturally, Tomorrow Square is made up of two prisms, the second which is offset diagonally from the first, marking the transition from the apartment section to the hotel. The top terminates in a peak composed of four triangles. To make the exterior vertical support system work, engineers chose flat slabs for the hotel floors and beam and slab construction for the office floors. A combination of shear walls and frame action stabilizes the slender tower laterally against wind and earthquake forces. The foundations are 80-meter (260 ft)-long bored piles supporting a column mat.

== See also ==
- List of tallest buildings in Shanghai
