= Monivong Boulevard =

Boulevard in Phnom Penh

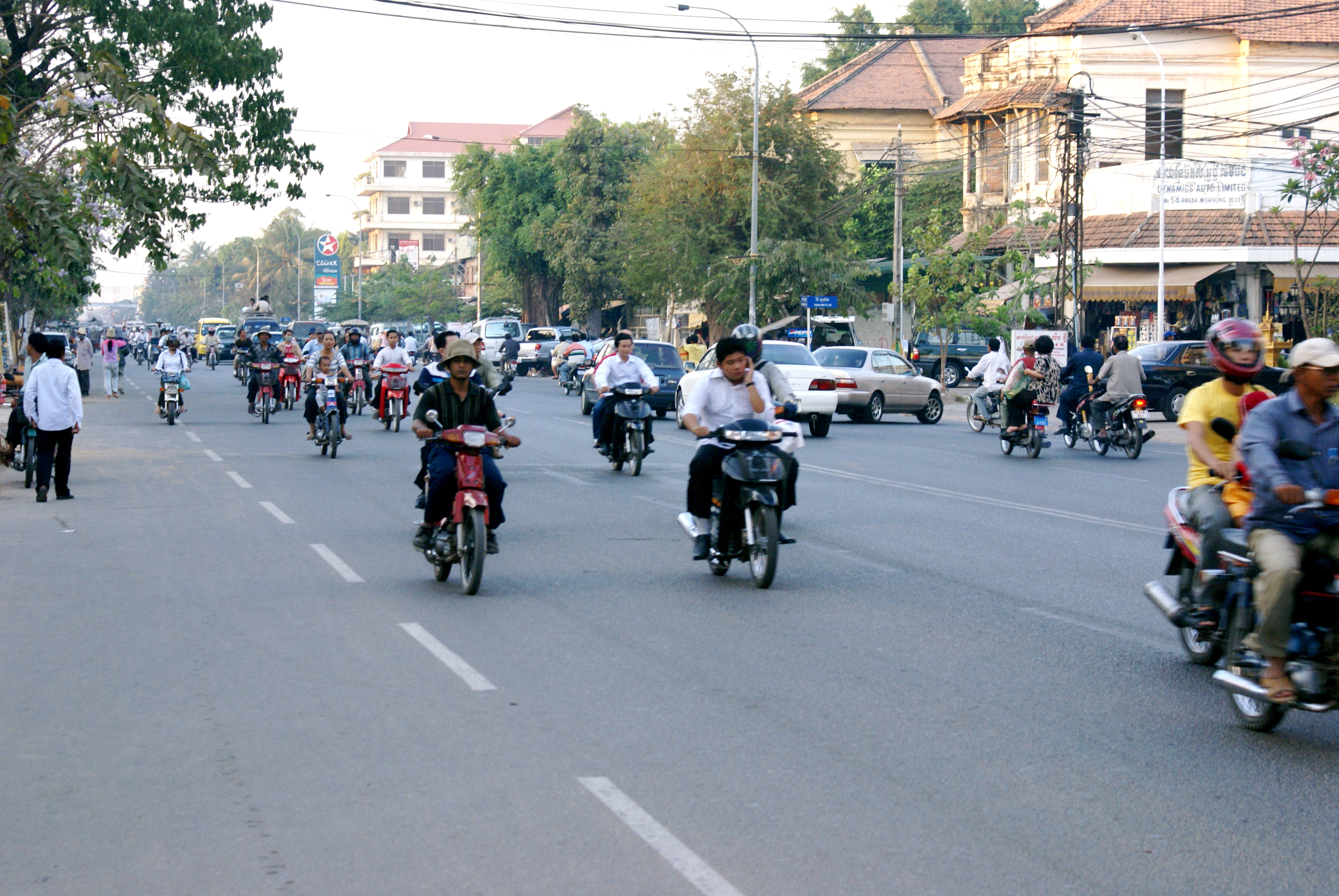
Monivong Boulevard.

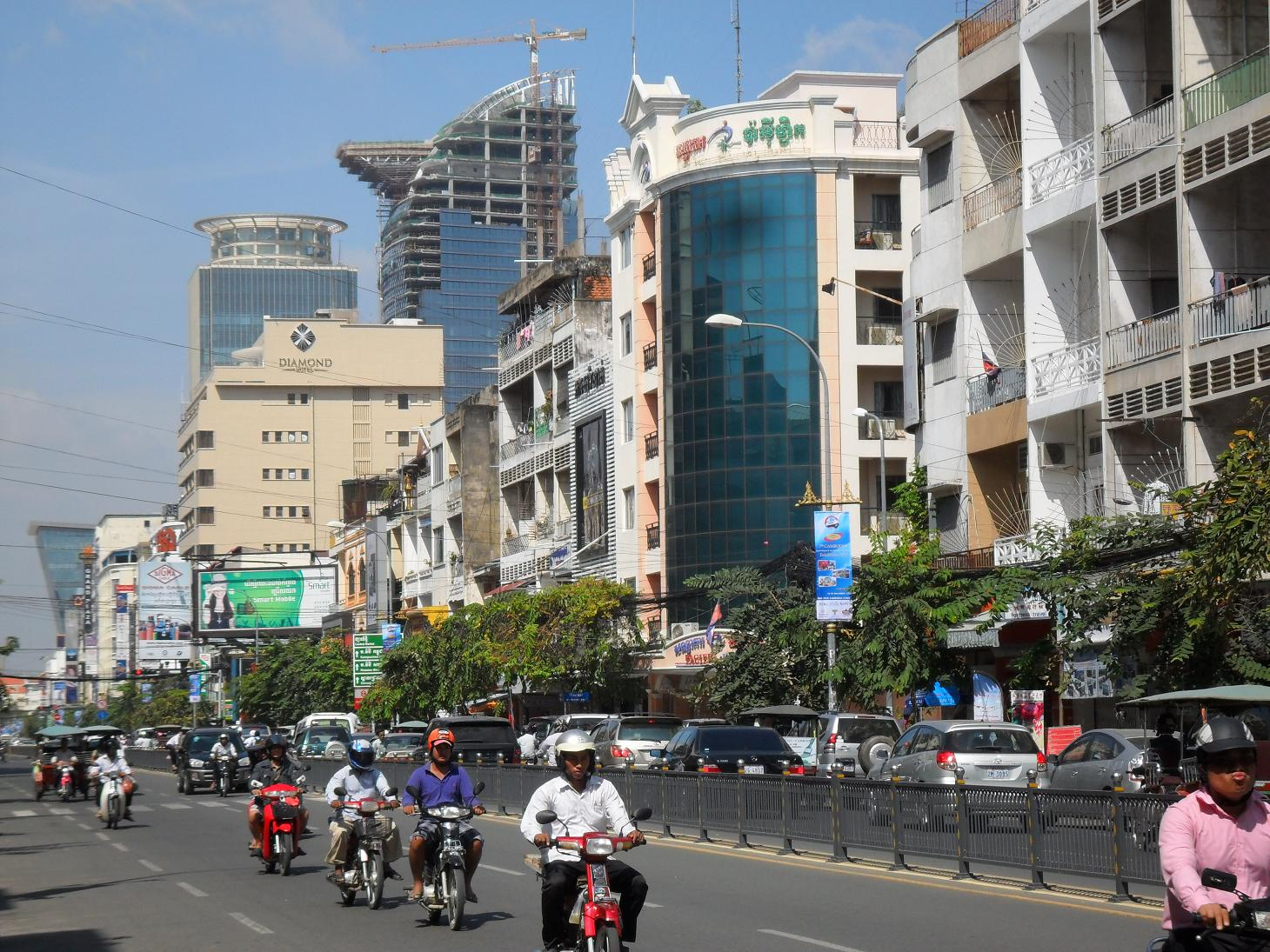
Buildings on Monivong Boulevard.

Monivong Boulevard (Khmer: មហាវិថីព្រះមុនីវង្ស, Mohavithei Preah Munivong [mɔ.haː.ʋi.tʰəj prĕəh mu.niː.ʋŭəŋ]), or Preah Monivong Boulevard, is a central boulevard and thoroughfare of Phnom Penh, the capital of Cambodia.

It was named after King Monivong of Cambodia. Most streets in Phnom Penh have numbers rather than names and Monivong Boulevard is also known as Street 93. It crosses Sihanouk Boulevard near the centre of the city.

== Route ==
Monivong Boulevard crosses the city from north to south.

The other main north south thoroughfare in the center of town is Norodom Boulevard. For most of its length, Monivong Boulevard runs parallel to Norodom Boulevard at a distance of 800 metres. However, the two major boulevards eventually join at the traffic circle near the Monivong Bridge over the Bassac River in the southern section of the city.

The Phnom Penh Hotel and Phnom Penh Commercial Bank are located on the boulevard.

== Gallery ==
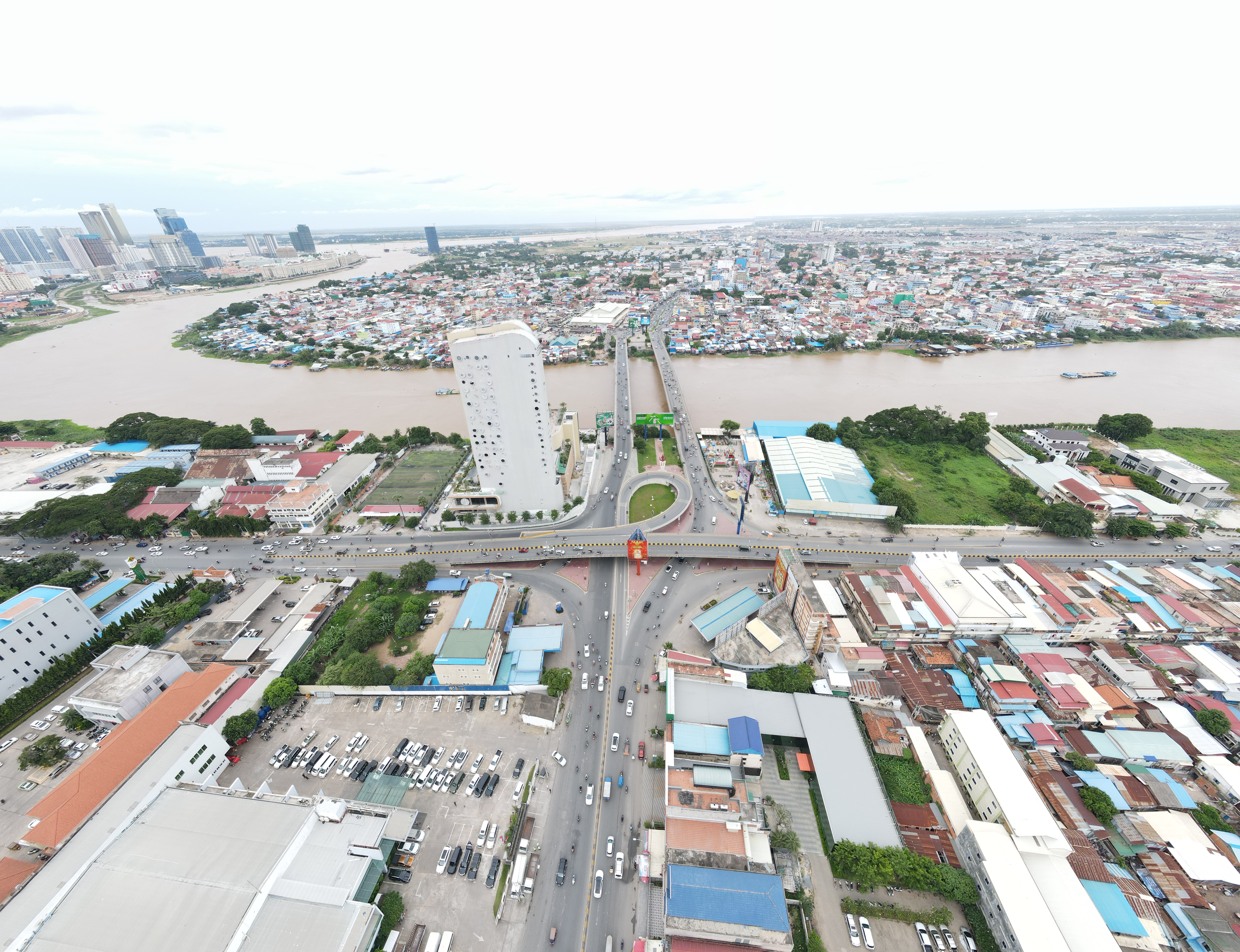
The Start Point of the Boulevard at Khbal Thnol Overpass, Monivong Bridge

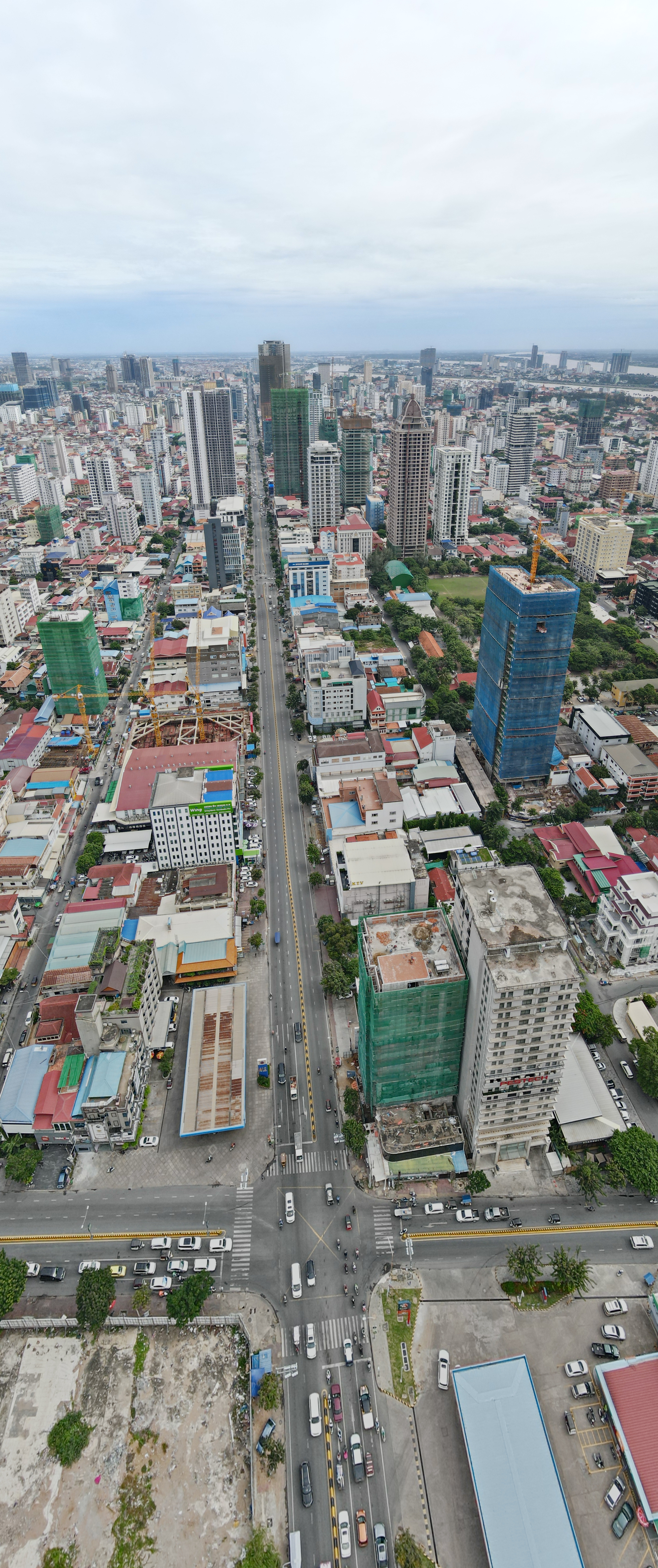
Aerial View of Preah Monivong Boulevard from Bokor Traffic Light

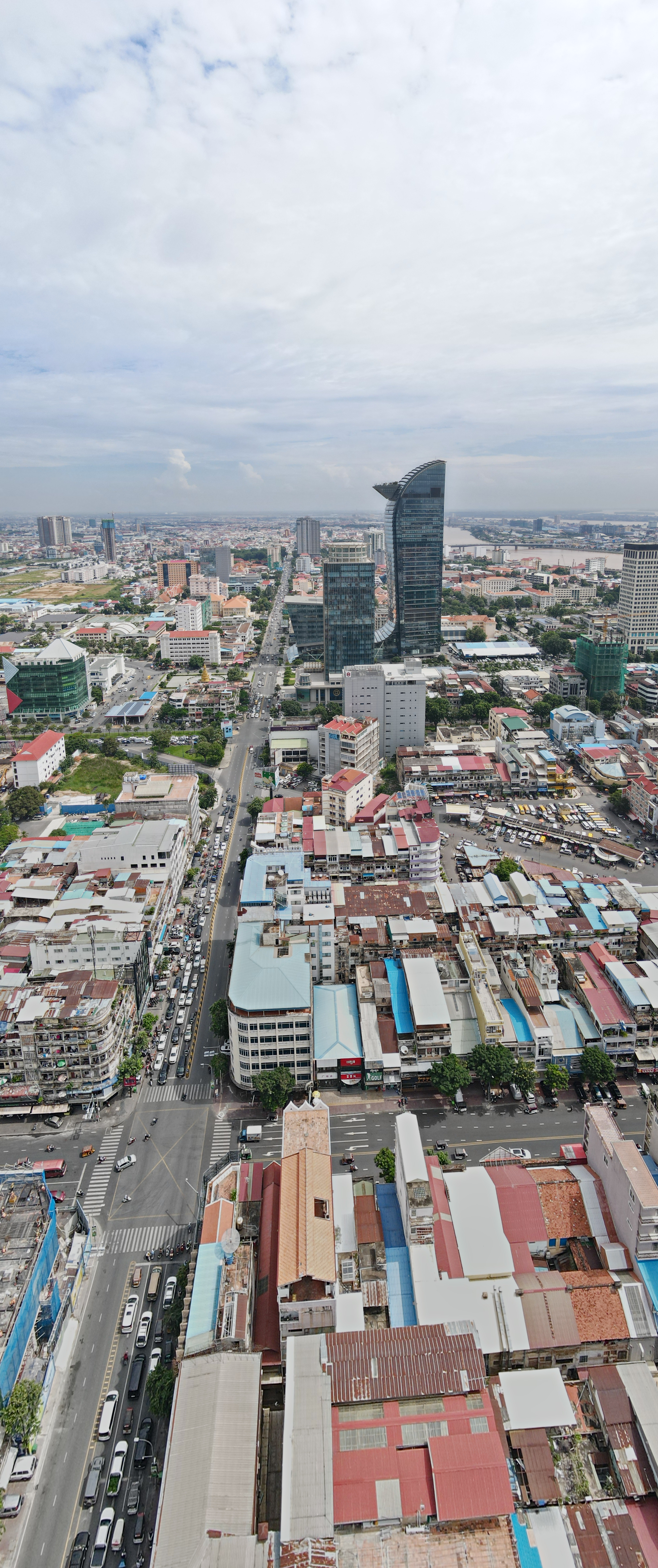
Aerial View of Preah Monivong Boulevard at Central Market Area

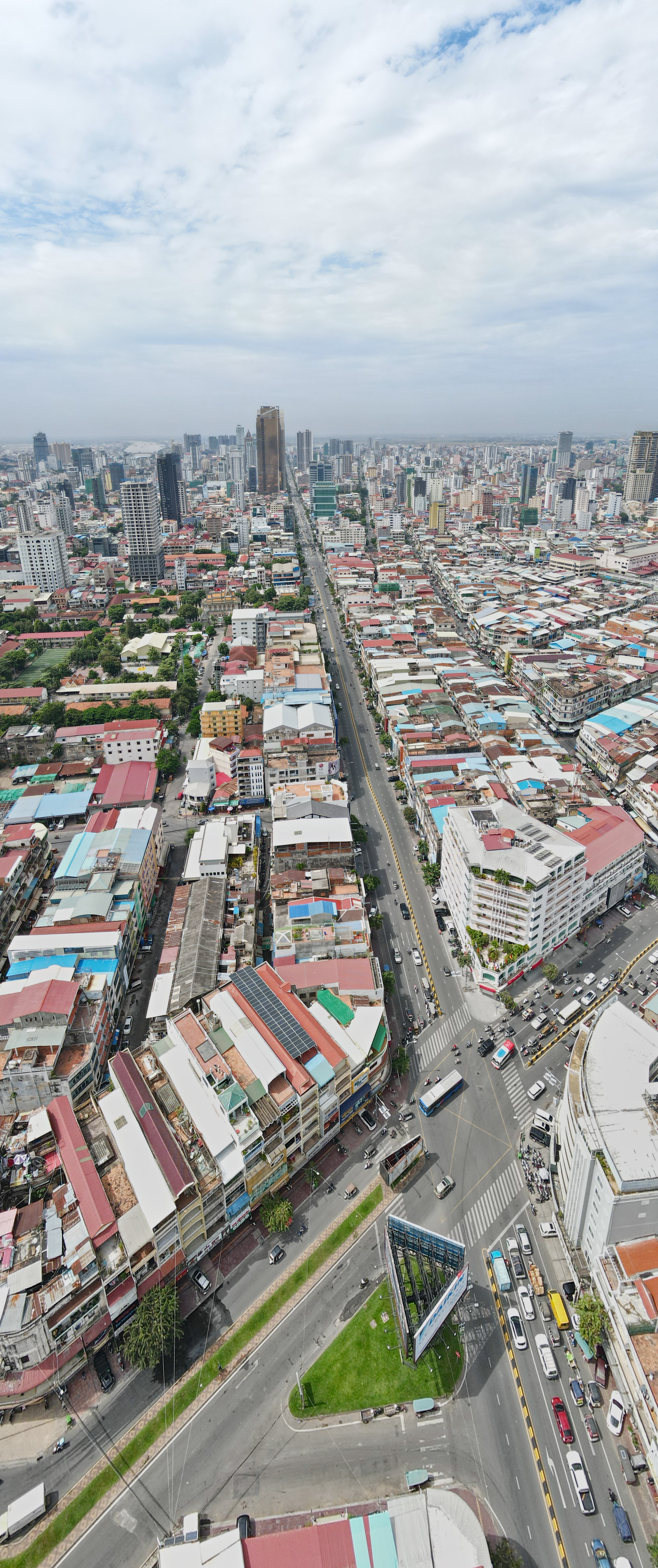
Aerial View of Preah Monivong Boulevard (North to South) at Central Market Area

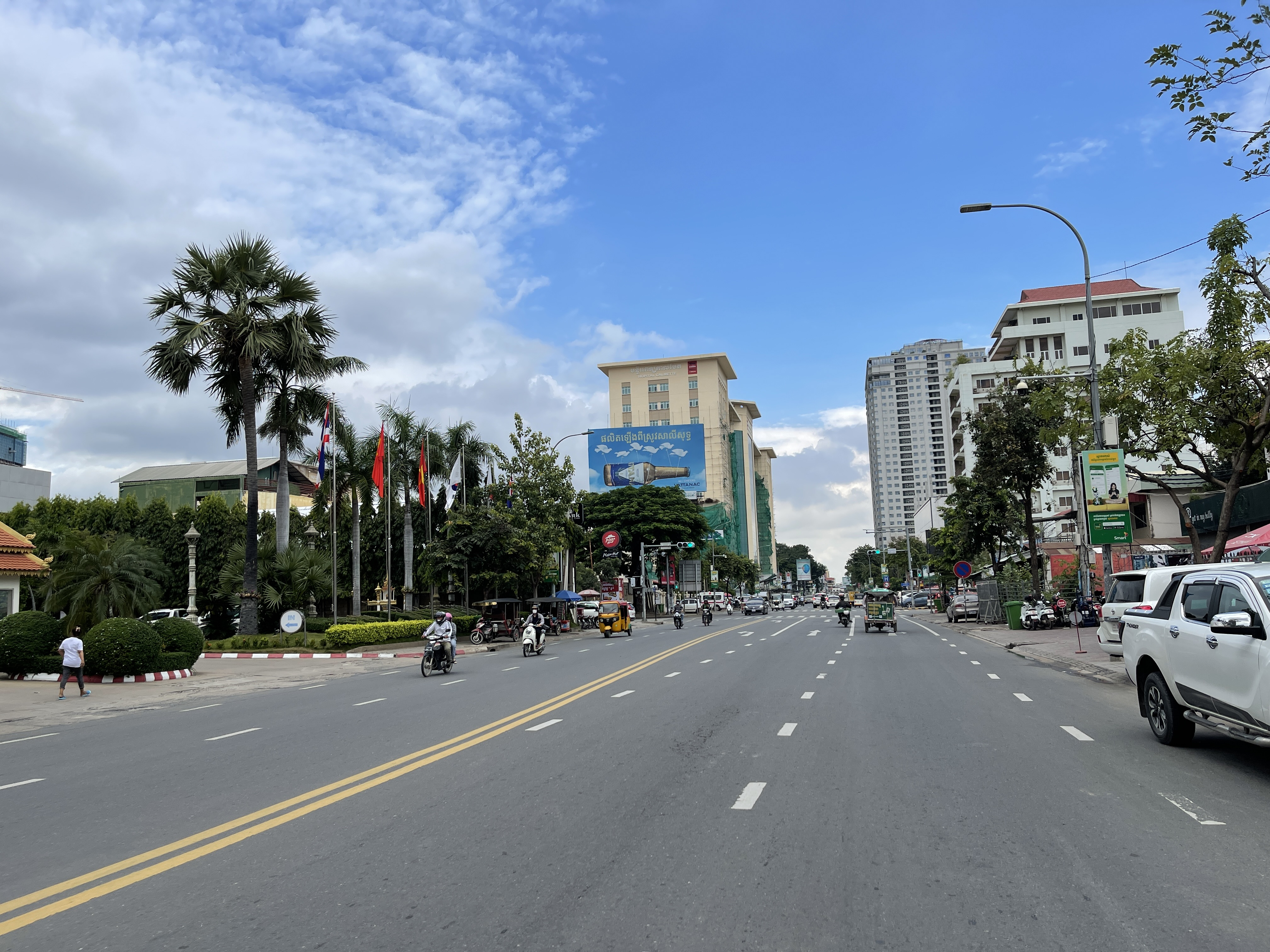
Preah Monivong Boulevard Near Calmette Hospital
