= Hotel International (Brno) =

Hotel International Brno

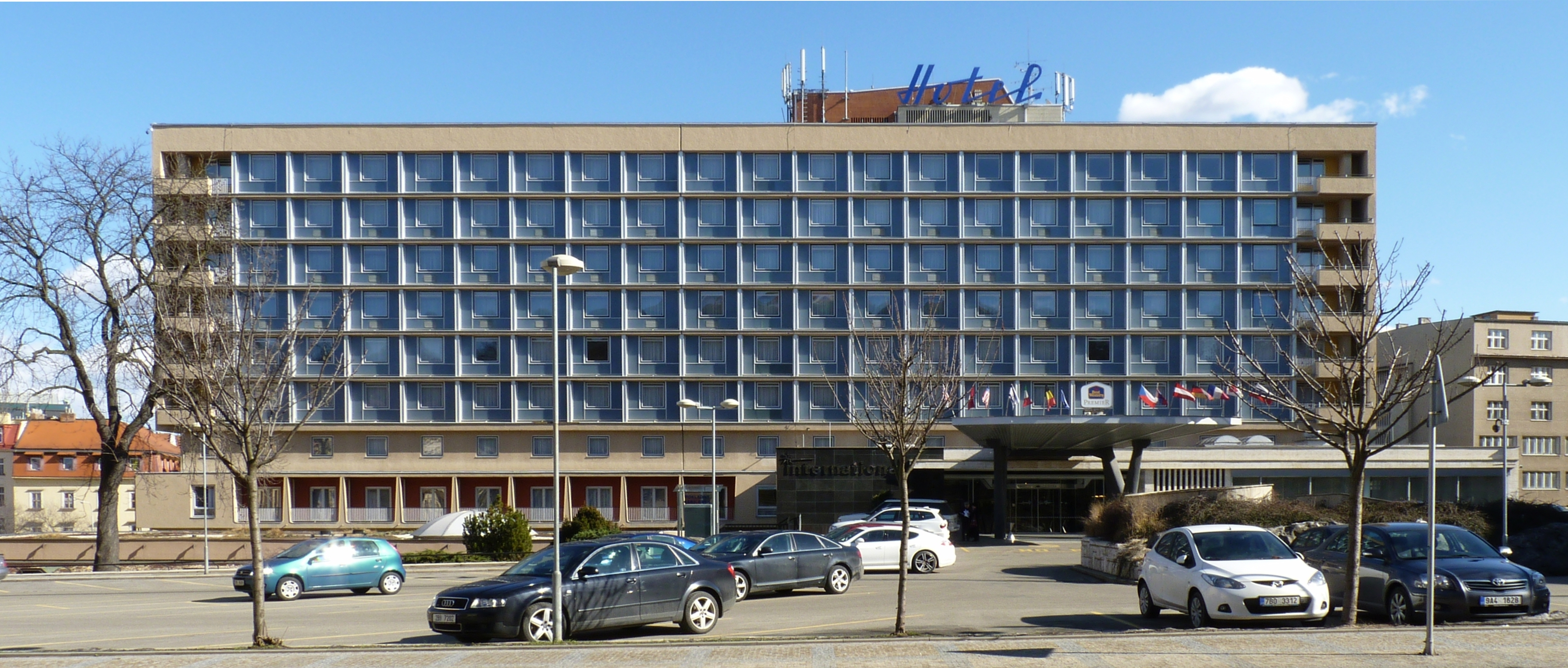
- Interactive map of the Hotel International Brno area
- Former names: Interhotel Brno

General information
- Type: Hotel
- Architectural style: Modernism
- Location: Brno, Husova 200/16, Brno-střed, 602 00, Brno, Czech Republic
- Coordinates: 49.194919°N 16.605529°E
- Construction started: 1959
- Completed: 1962
- Opened: 29 June 1962
- Inaugurated: 29 June 1962

Technical details
- Floor count: 11

Design and construction
- Architects: Arnošt Krejza, Miloš Kramoliš; Zdeňka Kopecká, Miroslav Brabec, Jiří Kadeřávek, Zbyšek Kašpar
- Known for: Cultural monument, Oscar Niemeyer-inspired building

Website
- www.hotelinternational.cz

The Hotel International in Brno, is one of the most important and best preserved buildings in the Brussels style in the Czech Republic.

The eleven-story hotel was built between 1959 and 1962, designed by Ernest Krejza and Milos Kramoliše. The building is inspired by the style of Brazilian architect Oscar Niemeyer. There are also features of late functionalism. The hotel was opened on 29 June 1962. From its inception to 24 December 2013, the building was a cultural monument. The hotel was operated from 1962 to 1989 by the state company Inter Brno.

At the time of its opening, the hotel had 301 rooms with a capacity for 697 guests. It had about 300 employees. After the Velvet Revolution in 1989, the hotel was privatized and ownership passed to Hotel International Brno, Inc., founded in 1992.
