= Phnom Penh Hotel =

Hotel in Phnom Penh, Cambodia

Coordinates: 60.1683°N 24.9469°E

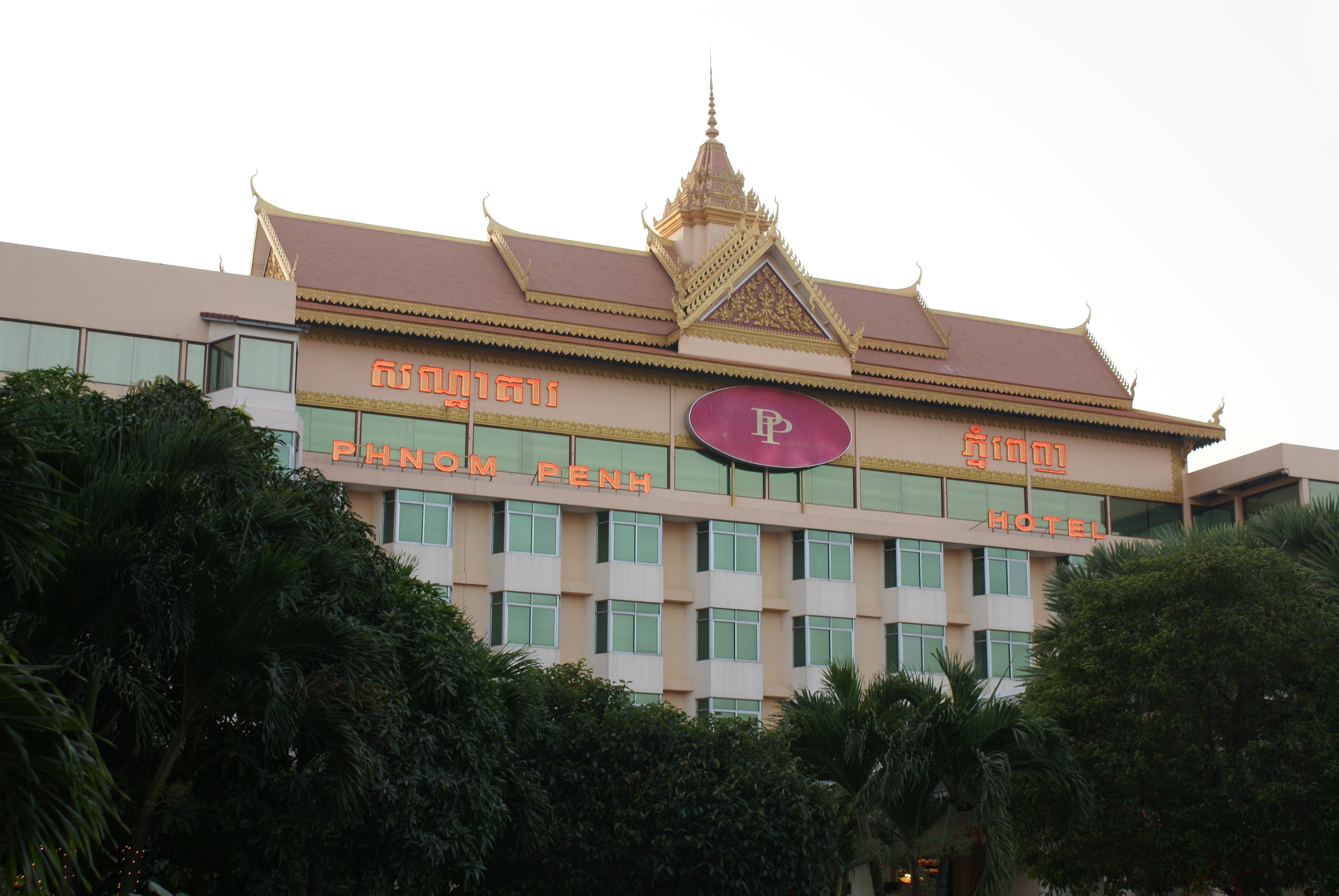

The Phnom Penh Hotel is a hotel in Phnom Penh, Cambodia. It has over 400 rooms and is located along Monivong Boulevard in the Central Business District of the city.

The hotel has a number of notable restaurants including Le Palace Chinese Restaurant, the Little Sheep Hot Pot Restaurant which serves a selection of meats and seafood and the Zen Japanese Restaurant which specialised in Sushi.
