= Grand Hyatt Shanghai =

Hotel in the Jin Mao Tower

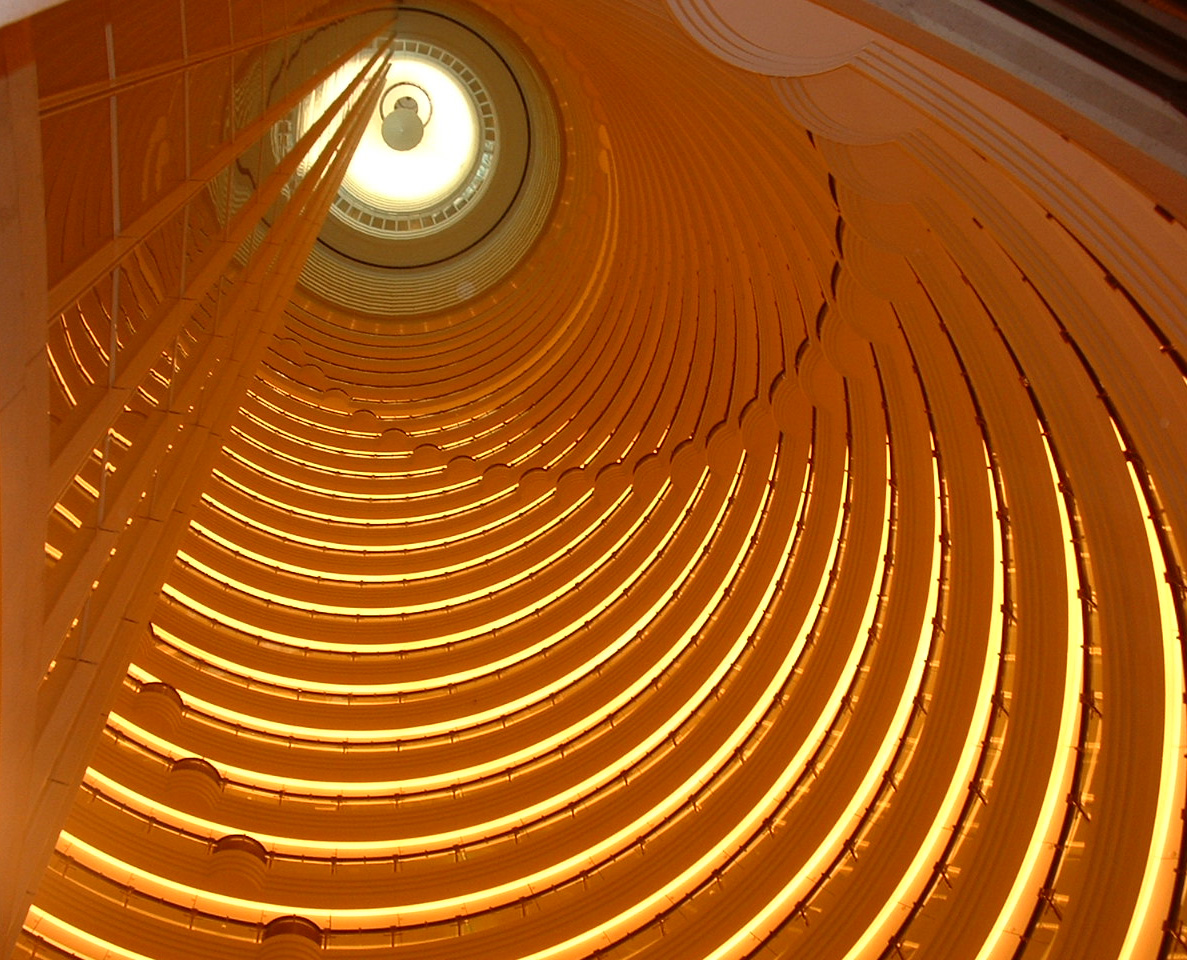
- The Grand Hyatt Shanghai atrium
- Interactive map of the Grand Hyatt Shanghai area

General information
- Status: Operational
- Location: Jin Mao Tower, 88 Century Avenue, Pudong, Shanghai 200121
- Management: Hyatt Hotels Corporation

Technical details
- Floor count: 35

Other information
- Number of rooms: 548

Website
- http://shanghai.grand.hyatt.com/

The Grand Hyatt Shanghai (simplified Chinese: 金茂君悦大酒店; traditional Chinese: 金茂君悅大酒店; pinyin: Jīnmào Jūnyuè dàjiǔdiàn) is a hotel located in the Pudong area of Shanghai. It is operated by the Hyatt Hotels Corporation, based in Chicago.

The 548-room hotel occupies the 53rd to 87th floors of the 88-storey Jin Mao Tower. The hotel was the highest hotel in the world with the hotel lobby located on the 54th floor until the Park Hyatt opened in the neighbouring Shanghai World Financial Center. The hotel features a 33-storey atrium.

== Features ==
The hotel offers views of The Bund, a stretch of restored historical buildings, along the Huangpu River. Eighteen different room styles are offered.

The Hyatt's barrel-vaulted atrium starts at the 56th floor and extends upwards to the 87th. Lined with 28 annular corridors and staircases arrayed in a spiral, it is 27 m (89 ft) in diameter with a clear height of approximately 115 m (377 ft).

== Gallery ==
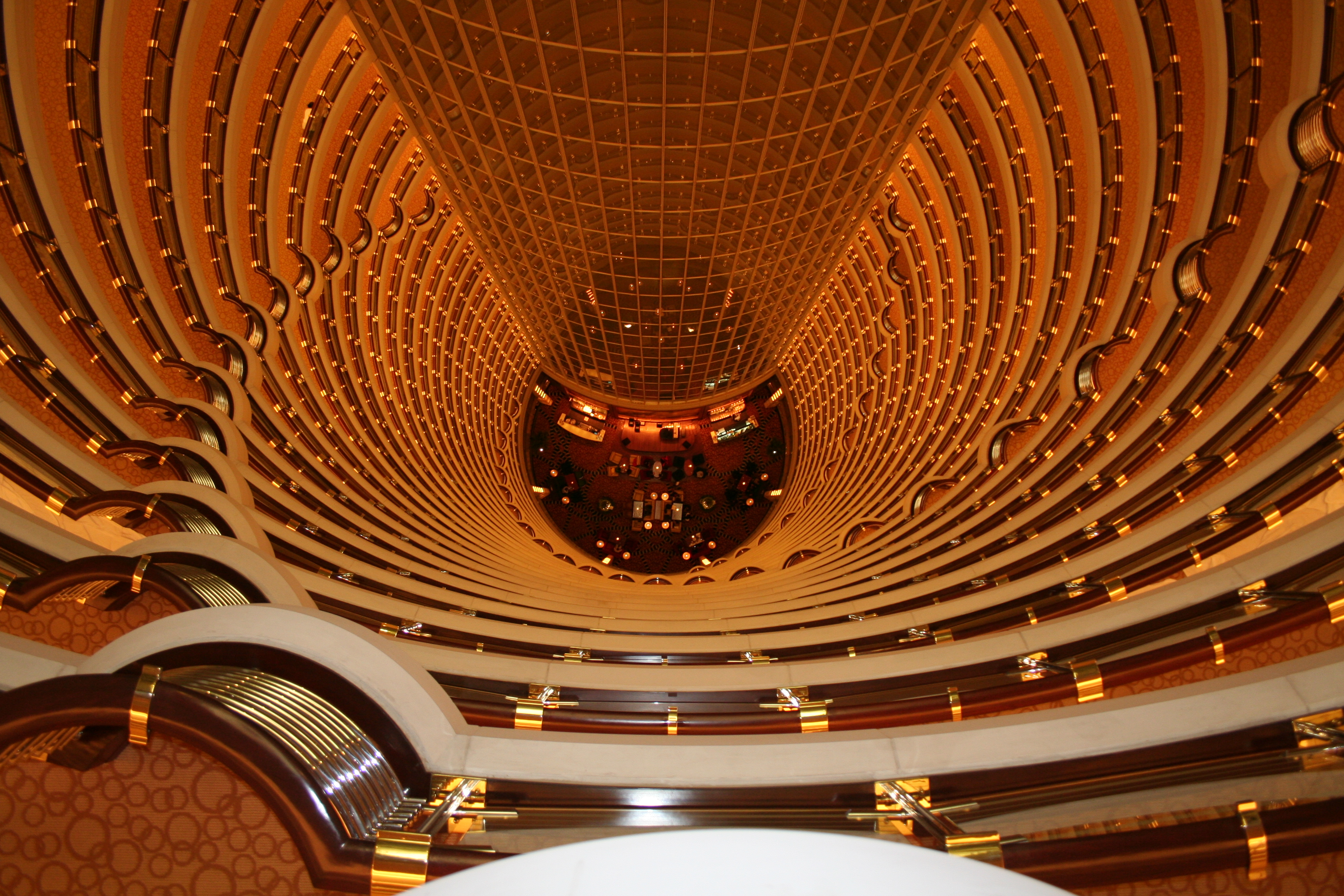
Lobby on the 30th floor of the Grand Hyatt Shanghai, taken from the 50th floor.

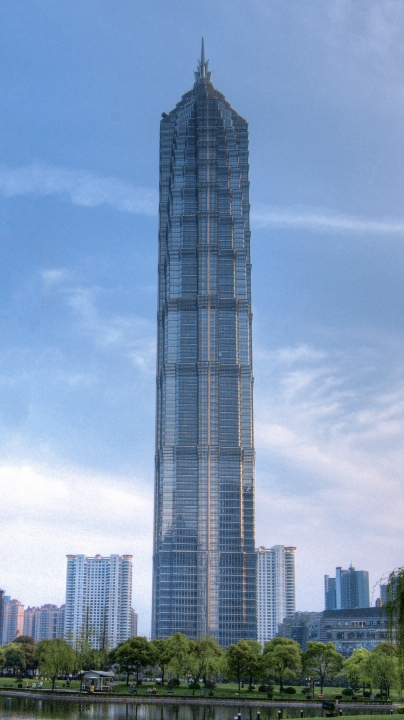
Jin Mao Tower, the building in which Grand Hyatt Shanghai is situated
