= The Great Duke Phnom Penh Hotel =

Coordinates: 11.5505°N 104.9027°E

- Interactive map of the The Great Duke Phnom Penh Hotel area

General information
- Type: Hotel
- Location: Phnom Penh,, Cambodia
- Opened: 1996

The Great Duke Phnom Penh Hotel was a 5-star hotel in Phnom Penh, Cambodia. The 15-story hotel had 346 rooms, and was located in the city centre.

== History ==
The hotel opened in 1996 as the InterContinental Phnom Penh. The hotel ceased to be managed by InterContinental Hotels on February 1, 2018, and was renamed The Great Duke Phnom Penh Hotel. The hotel closed permanently on December 31, 2019, citing financial problems.
