= JW Marriott Shanghai =

Hotel in Shanghai, China

Coordinates: 31.2308°N 121.4698°E

JW Marriott Hotel Shanghai 上海JW万豪酒店
- Interactive map of the JW Marriott Hotel Shanghai 上海JW万豪酒店 area

General information
- Location: Tomorrow Square
- Opening: October, 2003
- Management: Marriott International

Technical details
- Floor count: 60

Other information
- Number of rooms: 342
- Number of suites: 77
- Number of restaurants: 3
- Parking: Available

Website
- JW Marriott Shanghai

The JW Marriott Hotel Shanghai is a flagship hotel of the Marriott Group in Shanghai, China, that opened in 2003. It is housed at Tomorrow Square, the tallest building in downtown Puxi.

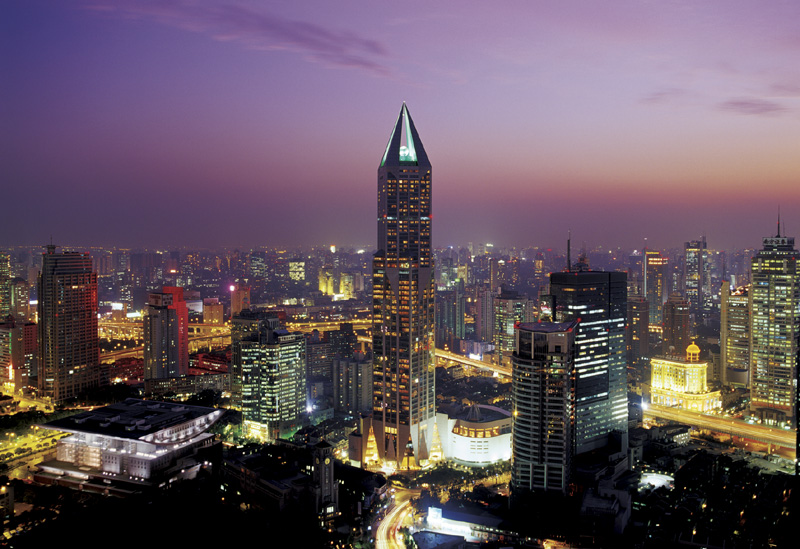
Nighttime exterior

Tomorrow Square was designed by Richards Mixon of John Portman & Associates. It houses the JW Marriott Hotel Shanghai and the Tomorrow Square, Shanghai - Marriott Executive Apartments.

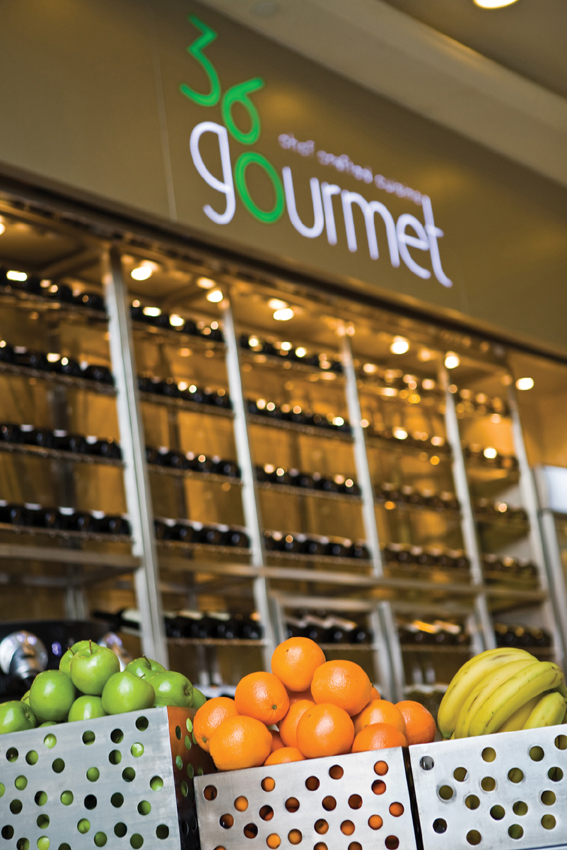
Ground Floor 360 Gourmet Shop

In 2016, Guinness World Records awarded the hotel a record for "highest library from ground level" for its executive library on the building's 60th floor.
