= Centre Hotel (Nanjing) =

Hotel in Nanjing, Jiangsu, China

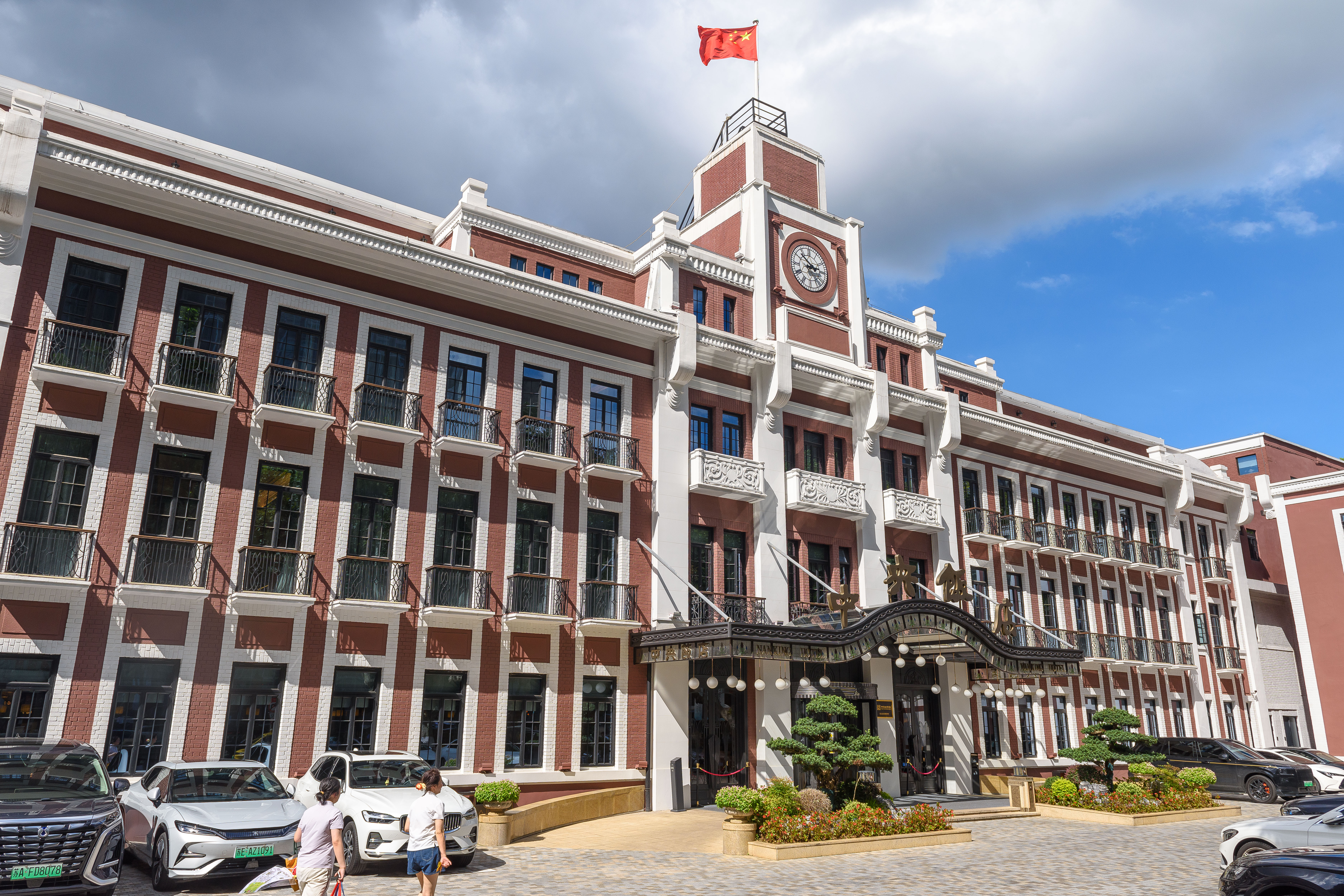
- Exterior in 2026
- Interactive map of the Centre Hotel area

General information
- Location: No.237, Zhongshan East Road, Nanjing, China
- Coordinates: 32.043281°N 118.792317°E
- Completed: 1930

The Centre Hotel (Chinese: 中央饭店; pinyin: Zhōngyãng fàndiàn) building, which was built in the late 1920s, is located at No.237, (Note: its original address was NO.303) Zhongshan East Road, Nanjing, China, and it is still called the Centre Hotel today. Facing south, the 3-storey Centre Hotel is a hybrid structure building designed in Western style, covering an area of 5,650 square metres and the gross floor area is 10,057 square metres. The Centre Hotel, being one of the best-known hotels in Nanjing (the capital of China during the Republic of China era) in the 1930s and 1940s, was famous for Western food. On June 10, 2006, it was listed in the third batch of Nanjing culture relics protection units.

== History ==
In January 1930, the Centre Hotel officially opened. The Centre Hotel hosted many celebrities over the years, such as Zhang Xueliang (Chinese: 张学良), Zhou Enlai (Chinese:周恩来), Zhu De (Chinese:朱德), Ye Jianying (Chinese: 叶剑英), Long Yun (Chinese: 龙云) (the military-political leader of Yunnan Province), Mei Lanfang (Chinese: 梅兰芳), leaders of overseas Chinese, Situ Meitang (Chinese: 司徒美堂) (the chairman of The China Zhi Gong Party) and John Leighton Stuart (US Ambassador). After the fall of Nanjing, the Centre Hotel was taken over by the PLA. In 1995, the Logistics Department of Nanjing Military Region moved out the residents. In the same year, the Shandong Zhicheng (Hong Kong) Interior Design Company renovated the Centre Hotel on the basis of maintaining its original look. On August 18, the construction was completed. The Centre Hotel reopened on September 19. The well-known politician Cheng Siyuan, Deputy Chairman of the Standing Committee of the National People's Congress, provided the calligraphy for the inscription of the hotel name.

Today, the cast iron balconies of the Centre Hotel’s guest rooms facing south and streets are still in their original condition of the Republican period. The stairs, handrails, balustrades and the floor boards of most rooms stay the same. With the construction area of 10318 square metres, the Centre Hotel has 117 rooms of different kinds.

== Overview ==
Located at Xinjiekou, the central business district Nanjing, Centre Hotel today is called Nanjing Zhongyang Hotel. It has 110 total rooms and contains facilities like a Chinese restaurant, a Western restaurant, conference rooms, banquet hall, and a beauty salon. The hotel was last renovated in 2011. In its hallways hang photos of olden days Nanjing and famous historical figures who has stayed at the hotel. The lobby has been maintained as it had been during Republican days.
