= East Asia Hotel =

Hotel in Shanghai, China

East Asia Hotel (simplified Chinese: 东亚旅馆; traditional Chinese: 東亞旅館) is a two-star hotel in Shanghai. It is located on Nanjing Donglu (Nanjing Road East).

== History ==
In 1917, Ma Ying-piu, the son of a gold miner who went to Australia, constructed the five-story building Sincere Department Store on Nanjing Road. Ma started his first Since Store in Hong Kong, and the Nanjing location was a higher-caliber branch. Known as Shanghai Dongya Hotel (simplified Chinese: 上海东亚饭店; traditional Chinese: 上海東亞飯店), it occupied the highest parts of the building. It was split into a hotel called East Asia Hotel (simplified Chinese: 东亚旅馆; traditional Chinese: 東亞旅館) and a restaurant called East Asia Another Floor (simplified Chinese: 东亚又一楼; traditional Chinese: 東亞又一樓) that specialized in Cantonese cuisine. The owner was Huang Huannan (Chinese: 黃煥南). According to the author Lingren Kong, "Based on the standards at the time, East Asia Hotel's facilities were first-class and it enjoyed a high reputation in Southeast Asia ... the East Asia Hotel was well-known in Shanghai." In 1948, the hotel was renamed to "Shanghai East Asia Hotel" (simplified Chinese: 上海东亚大饭店; traditional Chinese: 上海東亞大飯店) and the restaurant switched to specializing in Suzhou cuisine. In 1980, the hotel had 150 rooms that spanned seven floors.

The hotel is located in Nanjing Donglu (Nanjing Road East) and is in a noisy part of city. At its tip, the building features a spire. East Asia Hotel is located in Sincere Store, a building that used to be a department store. A junk replica is at the exterior of the hotel, which partly covers it. It was called Jin Jiang East Asia Hotel in 2010. The hotel's employees are accustomed to Western guests. It has a restaurant called East Asia Restaurant that specializes in Huaiyang cuisine and serves breakfast and lunch tea. The hotel was rebranded to Jinjiang Inn (simplified Chinese: 锦江之星; traditional Chinese: 錦江之星).

== Reception ==
Lonely Planet said "it's often booked out due to its prime location" and called the two-star hotel "clean and in good condition". Fodor's said the hotel "has long been a decent budget standby in the best part of the city".

== See also ==
- Shanghai Bund
- Nanjing Road
