= Jin Mao Tower =

Supertall skyscraper in Shanghai, China

Coordinates: 31°14′14″N 121°30′05″E

- 金茂大厦
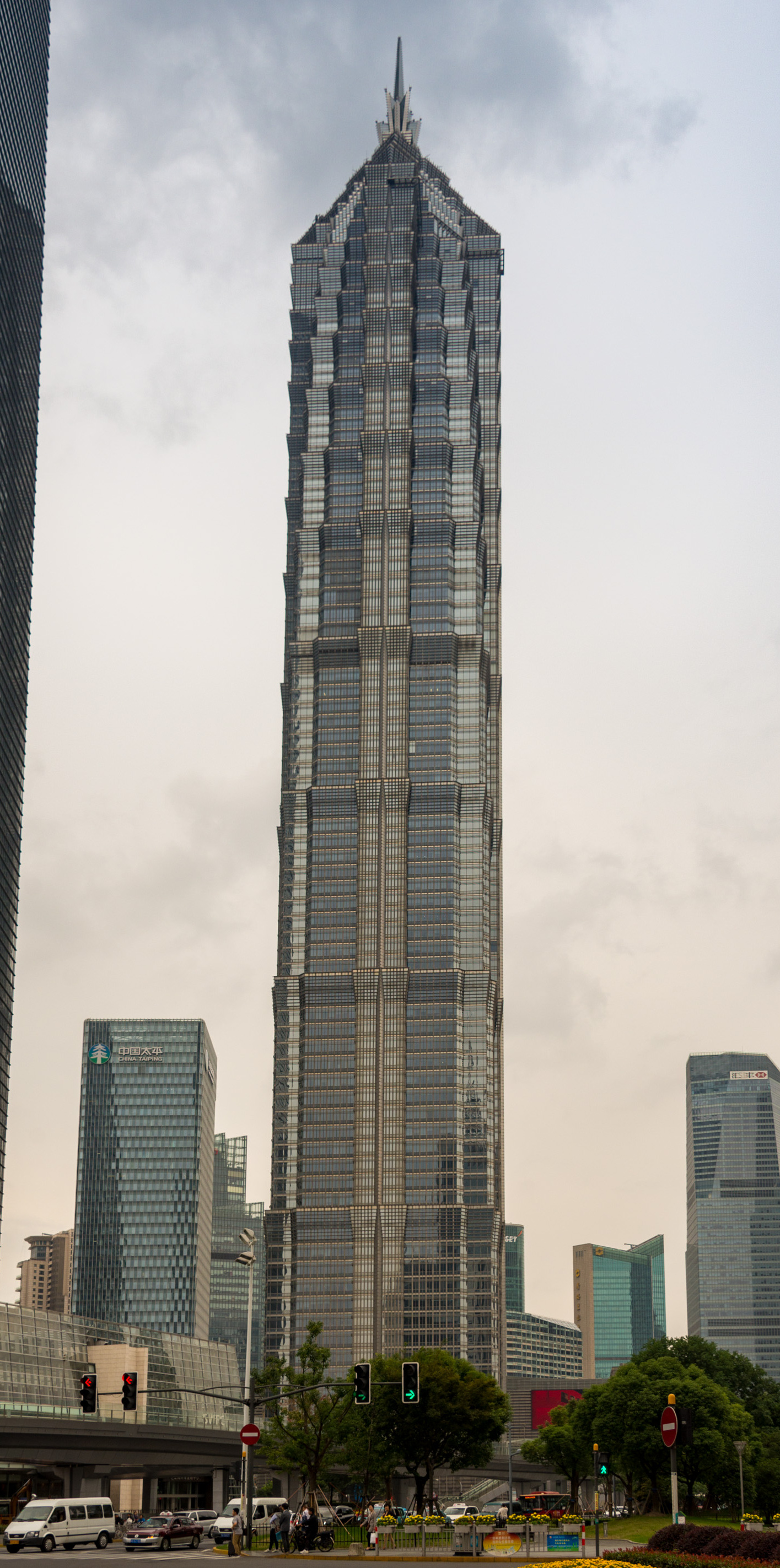
- Jin Mao Tower in 2016
- Interactive map of the Jin Mao Tower area

General information
- Status: Completed
- Type: Skyscraper (incl. office, hotel, tourism, & retail)
- Architectural style: Neo-Futurism
- Location: 88 Century Avenue; Pudong District, Shanghai 200121, China
- Construction started: 1994; 32 years ago
- Completed: 1999; 27 years ago
- Cost: US$530 million (1999)

Height
- Architectural: 420.5 meters (1,380 ft)
- Tip: 420.5 meters (1,380 ft)
- Antenna spire: 35 m (115 ft)
- Roof: 385.5 m (1,265 ft)
- Top floor: 375 meters (1,230 ft)
- Observatory: 374.5 meters (1,229 ft)

Technical details
- Floor count: 88 (+5 spire floors) (+3 basement floors) (Total: 96 floors)
- Floor area: 289,500 m^{2} (3,116,000 sq ft)
- Lifts/elevators: 61

Design and construction
- Architect: Adrian Smith at SOM
- Developer: China Jin Mao Group
- Structural engineer: SOM

The Jin Mao Tower (simplified Chinese: 金茂大厦; traditional Chinese: 金茂大廈; pinyin: Jīnmào Dàshà; Shanghainese: Cinmeu Dagho; lit. 'Golden Prosperity Building'), also known as the Jinmao Building or Jinmao Tower, is a 420.5-meter-tall (1,380 ft), 88-story (93 if counting the floors in the spire) landmark skyscraper in Lujiazui, Pudong, Shanghai, China. It contains a shopping mall, offices and the Grand Hyatt Shanghai hotel which starts from the 53rd floor; at the time of completion it was the highest hotel in the world. Along with the Oriental Pearl Tower, the Shanghai World Financial Center and the Shanghai Tower, it is part of the Lujiazui skyline seen from the Bund.

== Structure ==
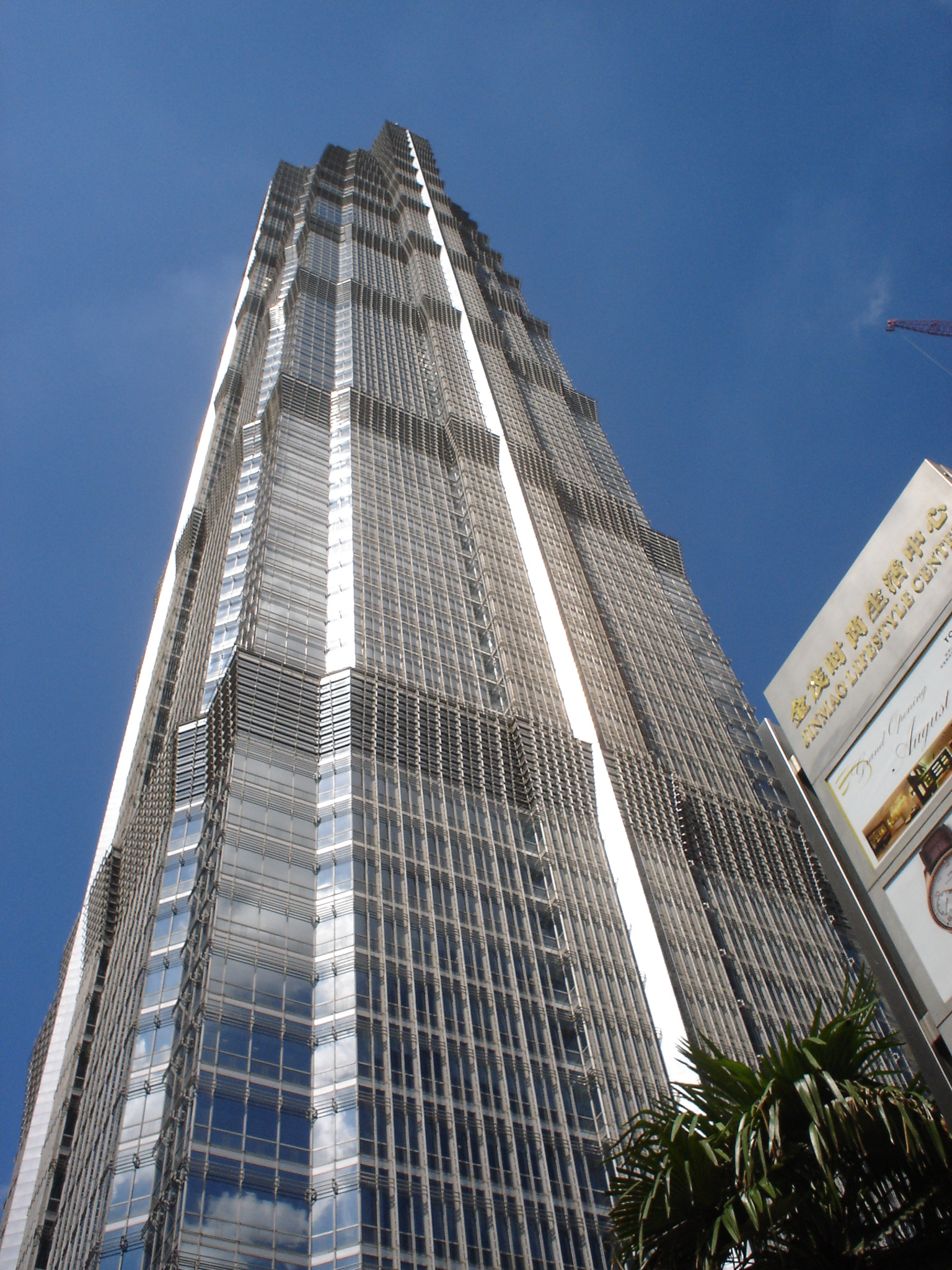
Looking up at the Jin Mao Tower

The building is located on a 24,000 m^{2} (260,000 sq ft) plot of land near the Lujiazui metro station and was built at an estimated cost of US$530 million.

It was designed by the Chicago firm of Skidmore, Owings & Merrill (SOM). Its postmodern form, whose complexity rises as it ascends, draws on traditional Chinese architecture such as the tiered pagoda, gently stepping back to create a rhythmic pattern as it rises. Like the Petronas Towers in Malaysia, the building's proportions revolve around the number 8, associated with prosperity in Chinese culture. The 88 floors (93 if the spire floors are counted) are divided into 16 segments, each of which is 1/8 shorter than the 16-story base. The tower is built around an octagon-shaped concrete shear wall core surrounded by 8 exterior composite supercolumns and 8 exterior steel columns. Three sets of 8 two-story high outrigger trusses connect the columns to the core at six of the floors to provide additional support.

The foundations rest on 1,062 high-capacity steel piles driven 83.5 m (274 ft) deep in the ground to compensate for poor upper-strata soil conditions. At the time of construction, these were the longest steel piles ever used for a land-based building. The piles are capped by a 4 m-thick concrete raft 19.6 m (64 ft) underground. The basement's surrounding slurry wall is 1 m thick, 36 m high and 568 m long. It is composed of 20,500 m^{3} (720,000 cu ft) of reinforced concrete.

The building employs an advanced structural engineering system of wind and earthquake engineering which fortify it against typhoon winds of up to 200 km/h (with the top swaying by a maximum of 75 cm or 30 in) and earthquakes of up to 7 on the Richter scale. The steel shafts have shear joints that act as shock absorbers to cushion the lateral forces imposed by winds and quakes. The swimming pool on the 57th floor is also said to act as a passive damper. The exterior curtain wall is made of glass, stainless steel, aluminum, and granite and is criss-crossed by complex latticework cladding made of aluminum alloy pipes.

== Operations ==
Official dedication was August 28, 1998, a date also chosen with the number 8 in mind. The building was fully operational in 1999. The Jin Mao Tower is owned by the China Jin Mao Group Co. Ltd (formerly "China Shanghai Foreign Trade Center Co. Ltd"). It reportedly has a daily maintenance cost of 1 million RMB (US$121,000).

The building has 3 main entrances to the lobby: two for the office portion and one for the hotel. The basement has express elevators to the observation deck and a parking area for 600 vehicles and 7,500 bicycles. In total, 61 Mitsubishi elevators and 19 escalators carry visitors throughout the building. Levels 51, 52, and 89–93 are mechanical floors, accessible only by service elevators.

=== Occupants ===
The 3-level basement has a food court, while the first two floors include the Hyatt's conference and banquet facilities. The first six floors include a shopping mall, restaurants, and nightclubs, include Pu-J's.

The lower 50 floors (in the first 4 segments of the tower) are made up of 123,000 m^{2} (1,320,000 sq ft) of offices, divided into 5 elevator zones (3-6, 7-17, 18-29, 30-40, and 41-50). Office spaces are open-plan (column-free), with a floor-to-floor gross height of 4.0 m (13.1 ft) and net height of 2.7 m (8 ft 10 in).

=== Grand Hyatt Shanghai ===
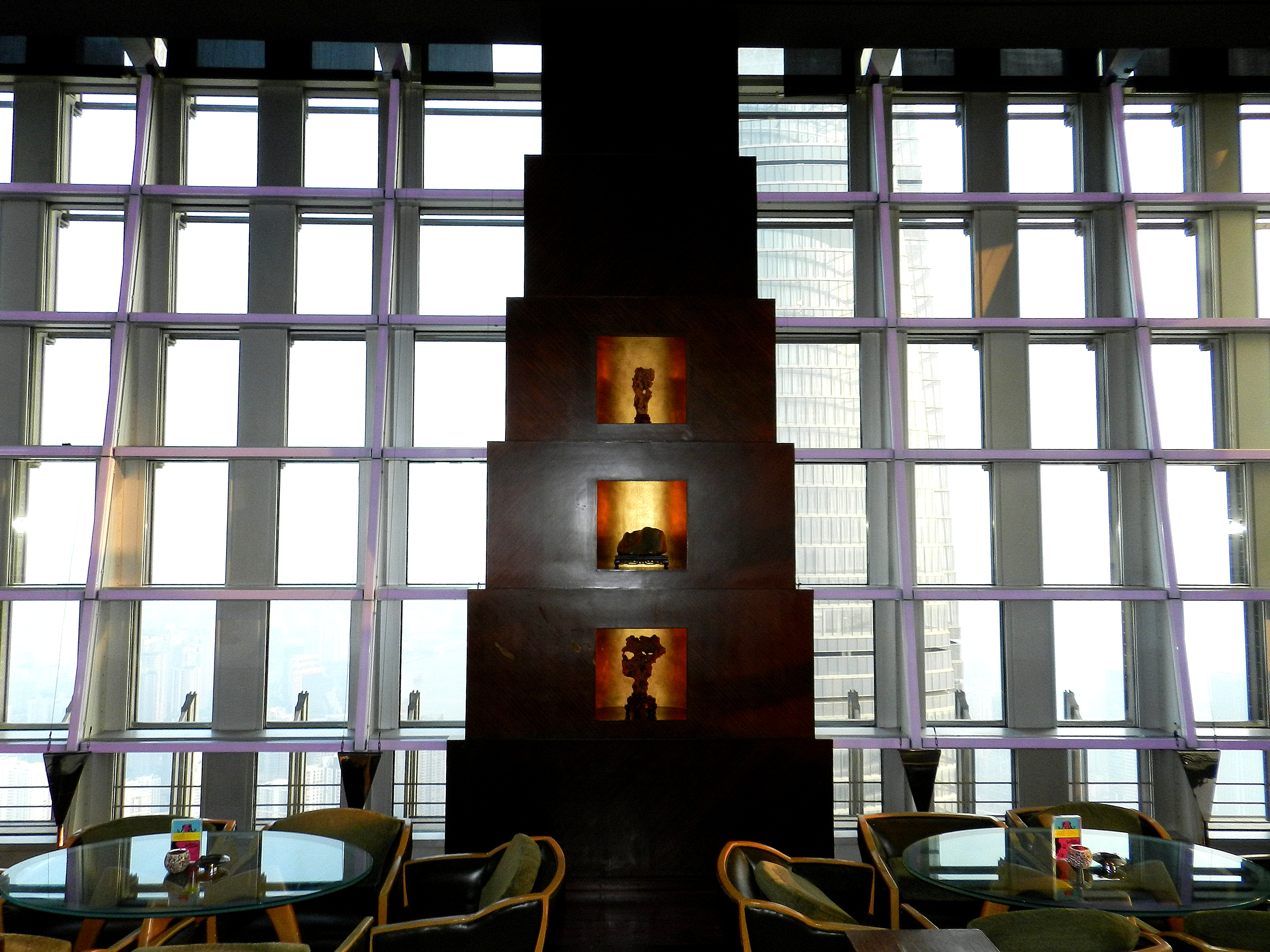
The interior of the Cloud 9 Bar, located at the 87th floor of the Jinmao Tower

The building's anchor tenant is the five-star 555-room Grand Hyatt Shanghai hotel which occupies floors 53 to 87. It is one of the highest hotels in the world, second in Shanghai only to its sister property, the Shanghai Park Hyatt, occupying the 79th to 93rd floors of the immediately adjacent Shanghai World Financial Center. These have since been surpassed by The Ritz-Carlton, Hong Kong, which occupies floors 102 to 118 of the International Commerce Center in Hong Kong. However, the tallest building to be used exclusively as a hotel is the JW Marriott Marquis Dubai. (Note: Excluding the taller Ryugyong Hotel which was never actually in use.) Additionally, the world's longest laundry chute runs down the full length of the tower to the basement, incorporating buffers to slow the laundry during its descent.

The Hyatt's famous barrel-vaulted atrium starts at the 56th floor and extends upwards to the 87th. Lined with 28 annular corridors and staircases arrayed in a spiral, it is 27 m (89 ft) in diameter with a clear height of approximately 115 m (377 ft). (Note: A commonly quoted atrium height of 152 m is owed to a mistaken assumption of 38 floors of 4 m each rather than the actual 32 floor of around 3.5 m each. (The last few are a little taller.)) It is one of the tallest atria in the world, the tallest being the Burj Al Arab's.

The hotel floors also feature:

- 53: The Piano Bar, a jazz club.
- 54: The hotel lobby and Grand Café, served by an express elevator from the tower's ground floor.
- 55: Canton, a high-end Cantonese restaurant that takes up the entire floor.
- 56: A collection of restaurants including The Grill, the Italian Cucina, the Japanese Kobachi, and the Patio Lounge located at the base of the atrium.
- 57: Club Oasis, a fitness club featuring what was once the world's highest swimming pool.
- 85: The highest level of rooms in the hotel and elevators to the two levels above
- 86: Club Jin Mao, a Shanghainese restaurant.
- 87: Cloud 9, a sky bar with panoramic view.

=== Skywalk ===
The Skywalk, a 1,520 m^{2} (16,400 sq ft) indoor observation deck with a capacity of 1,000+ people, occupies the 88th floor of the building. In addition to the panoramic views of Shanghai, it offers a topside view of the hotel atrium below. It also includes a small post office. Access is through two express elevators from the basement that travel at 9.1 m/s and take 45 seconds to reach the top. As of 2009, admission to the 88th floor costs 88 RMB for adults and 45 RMB for children.

== Events ==
- On February 18, 2001, Han Qizhi, a 31-year-old shoe salesman from Anhui province "struck by a rash impulse", climbed the building barehanded and in street clothes. He was arrested with bleeding hands and detained for about two weeks.
- On October 5, 2004, as part of Shanghai's National Day celebrations, a multi-national group of BASE jumpers invited by the Shanghai Sports Bureau leapt from the top of the tower. The 34-year-old Australian jumper Roland Simpson's parachute malfunctioned and he crashed himself against an adjacent building. He fell into a coma and died in Australia on October 22.
- In early 2007, the building was illuminated with the name Windows Vista as part of Microsoft's marketing campaign for the operating system.
- Also in 2007, after years of being refused permission to climb the building, the French urban climber Alain Robert was arrested, jailed for 5 days, and expelled from China for his unauthorized ascent and descent, made while wearing a Spider-Man costume.
- On April 3, 2009, Shanda used a laser-light show on the tower to advertise the open beta of Aion: The Tower of Eternity. The image made by the lasers could be seen from 7:30 pm to 10:00 pm and ran until April 12, 2009.
- In March 2016 three foreigners climbed to the top of the tower. They were detained by police after they were spotted by a security guard.

== Gallery ==
Jin Mao Tower

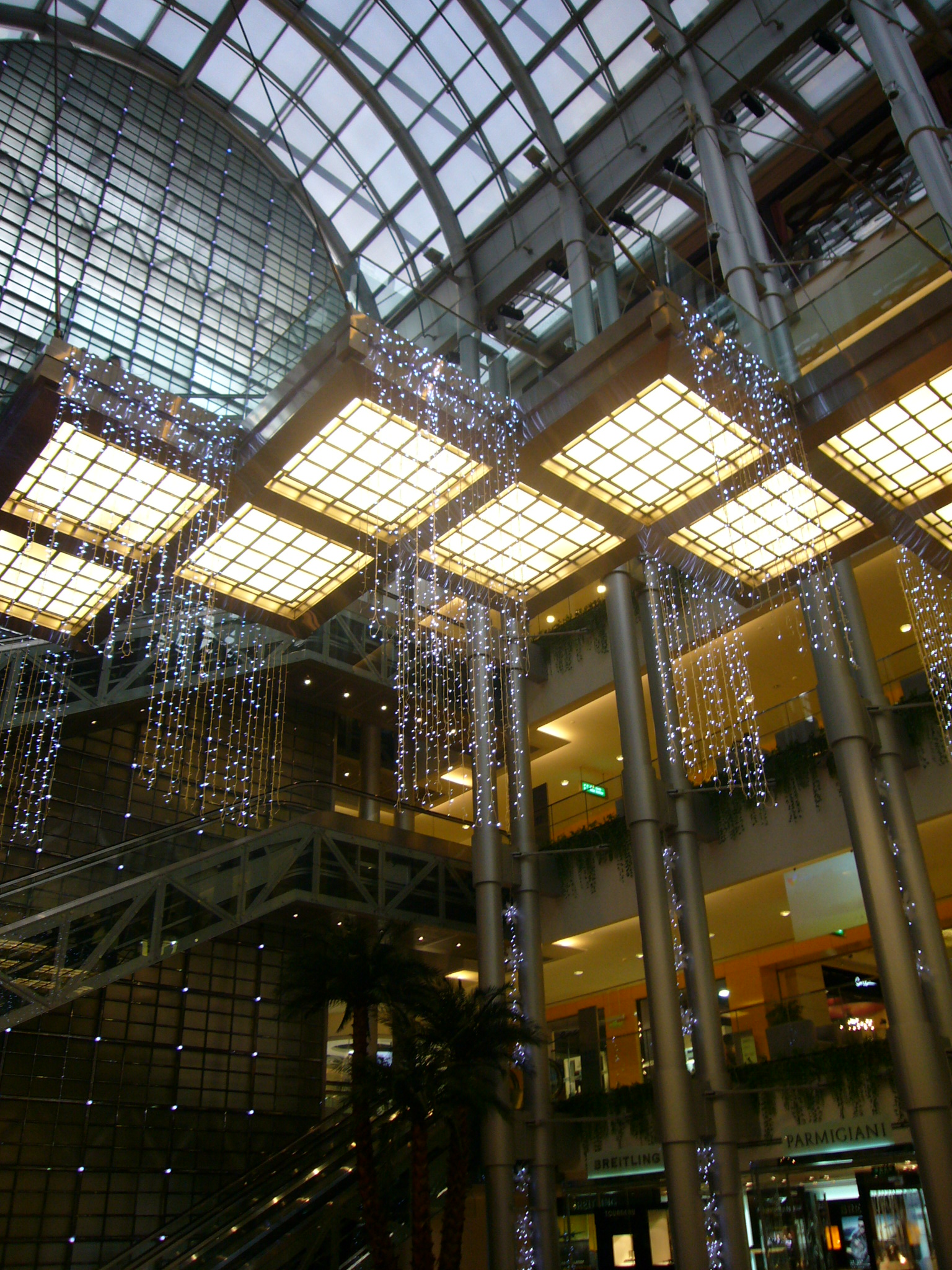
The Jin Mao Tower's retail area in the lower floors

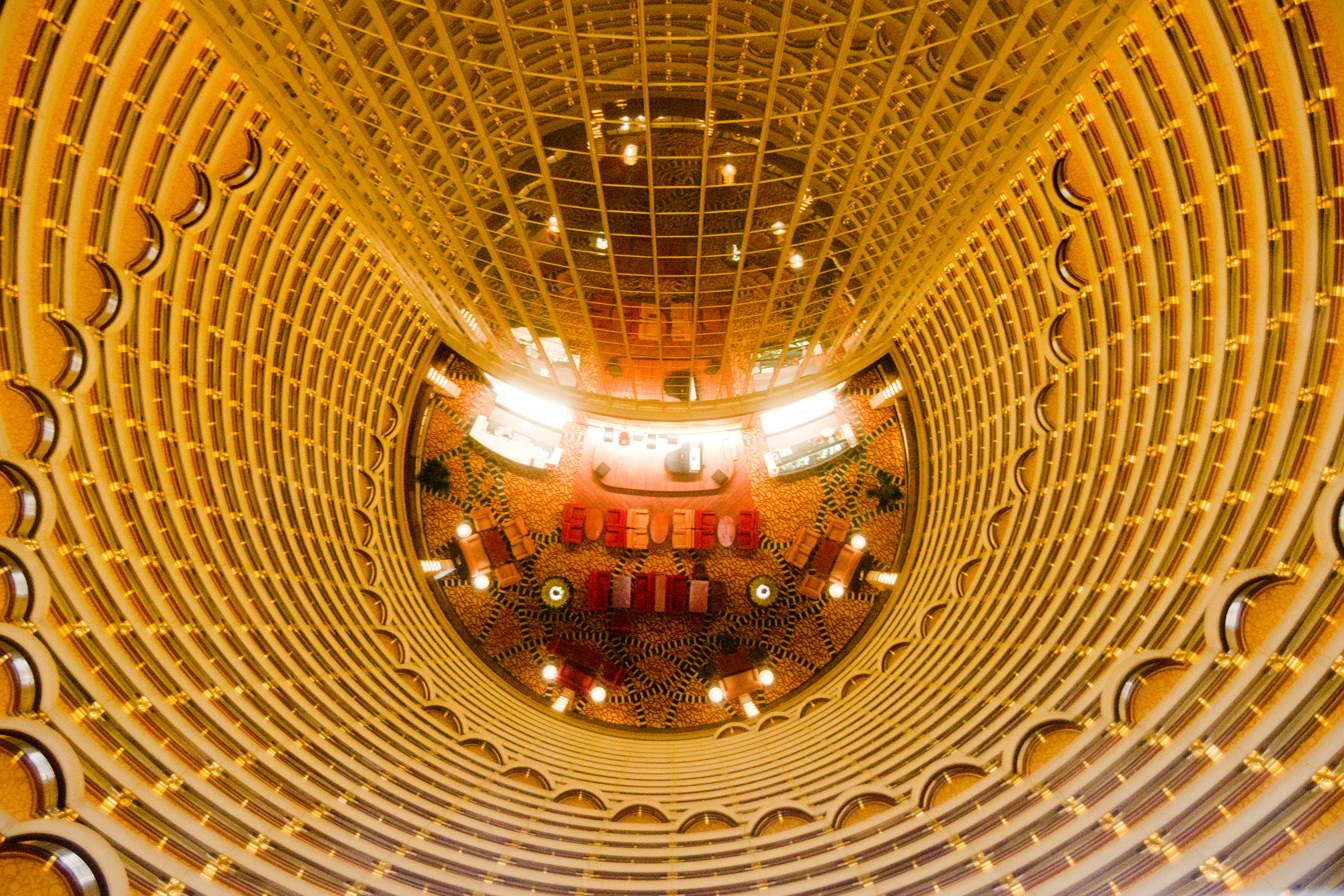
The hotel's atrium, viewed from the Skywalk on the 88th floor

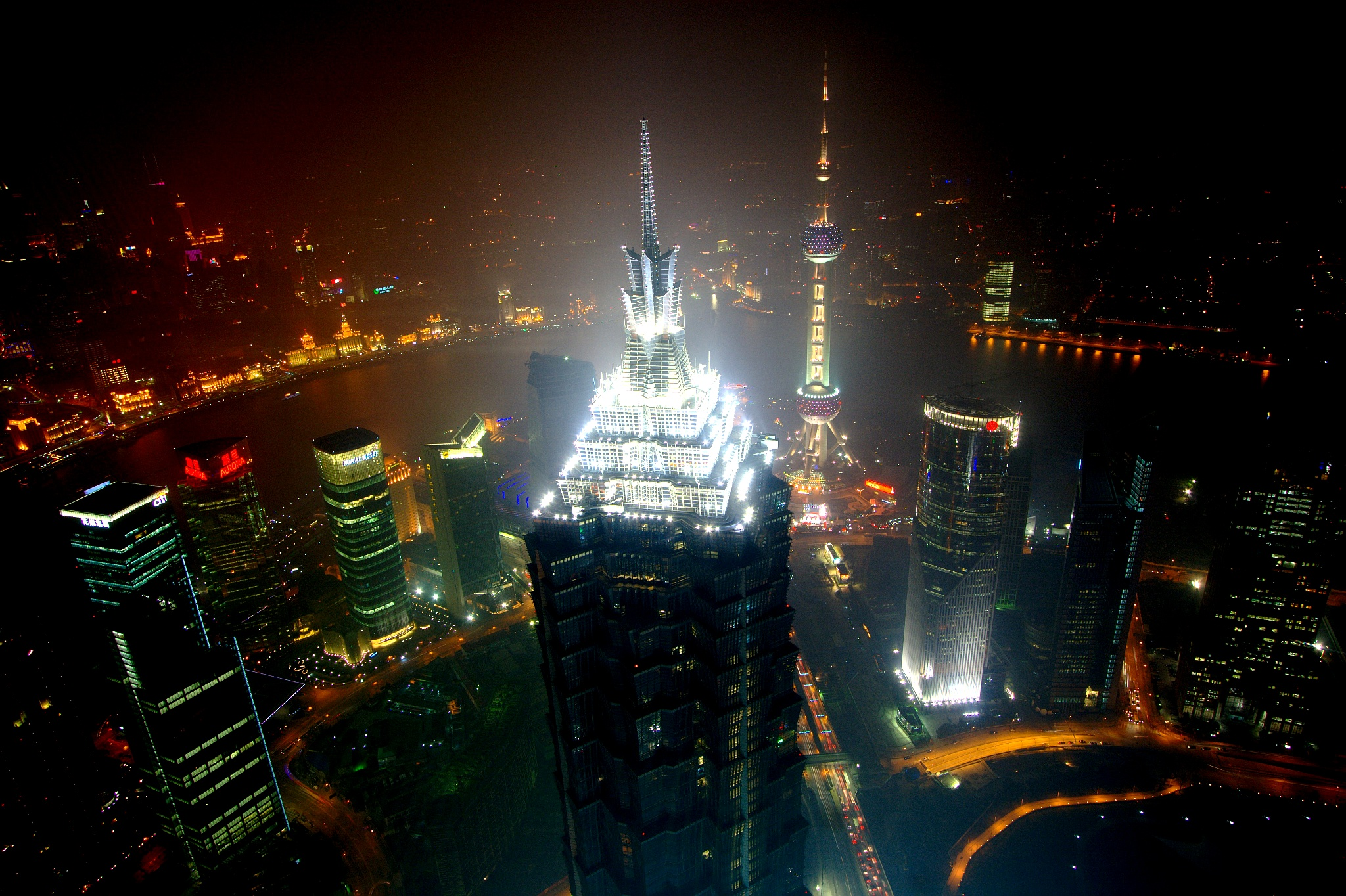
The four mechanical stories forming the spire of the building are brightly illuminated at night

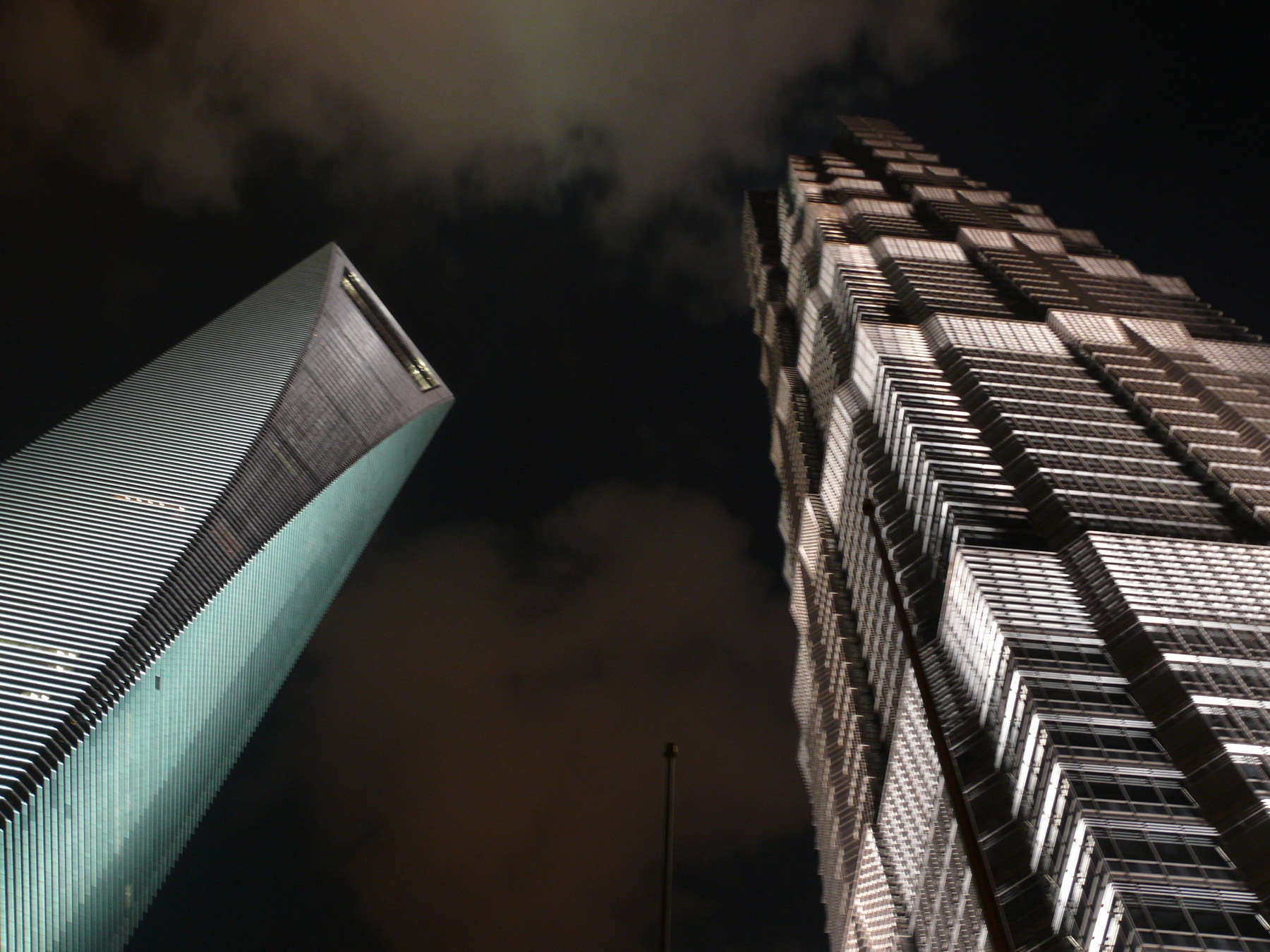
The SWFC and Jin Mao Tower, displaying the latter's latticework cladding of aluminum alloy pipes.

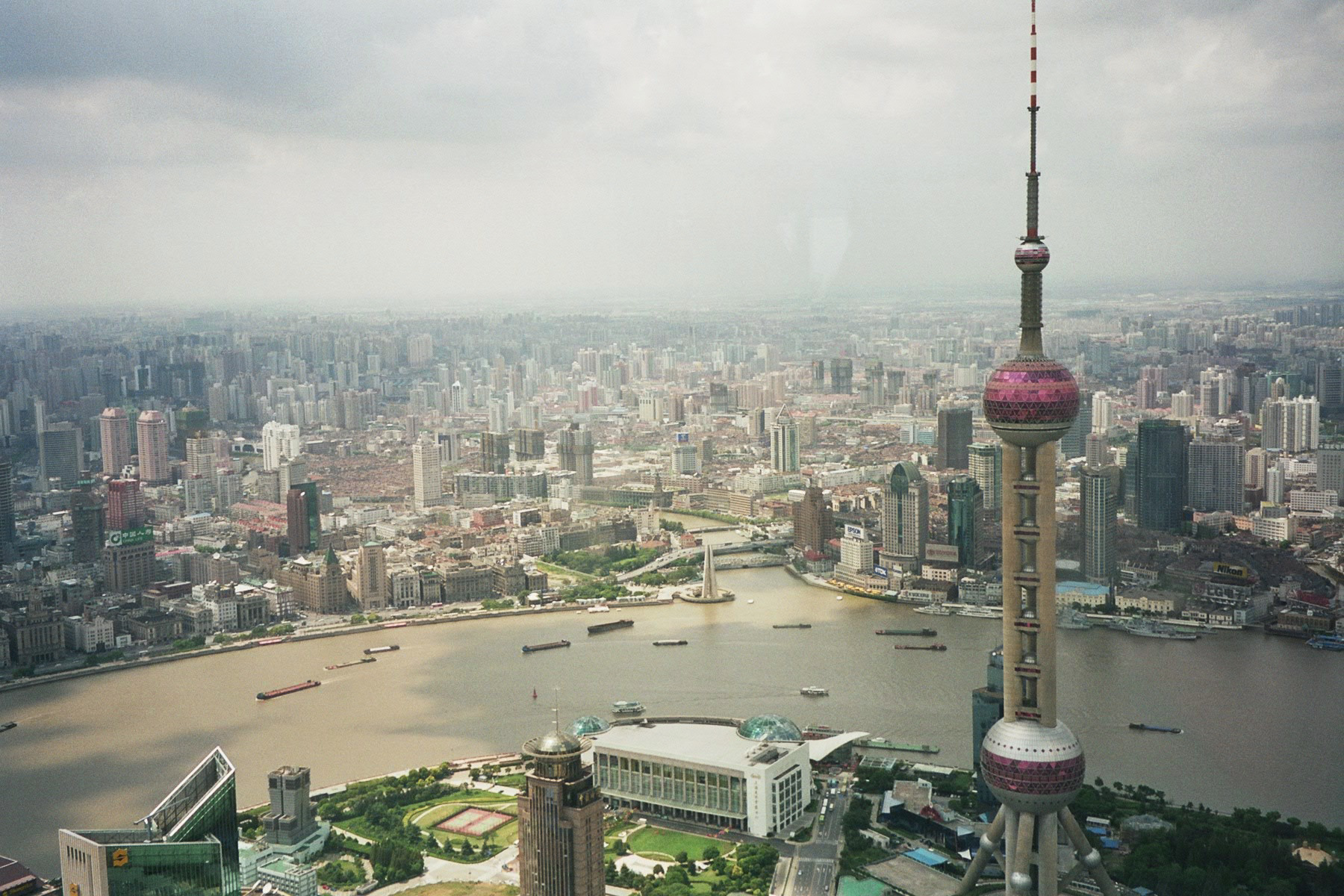
A view from the Jin Mao Tower's Skywalk, showing the Oriental Pearl Tower in Lujiazui and, across the Huangpu River, Shanghai's Bund, Nanjing Road, and the Garden Bridge across Suzhou Creek

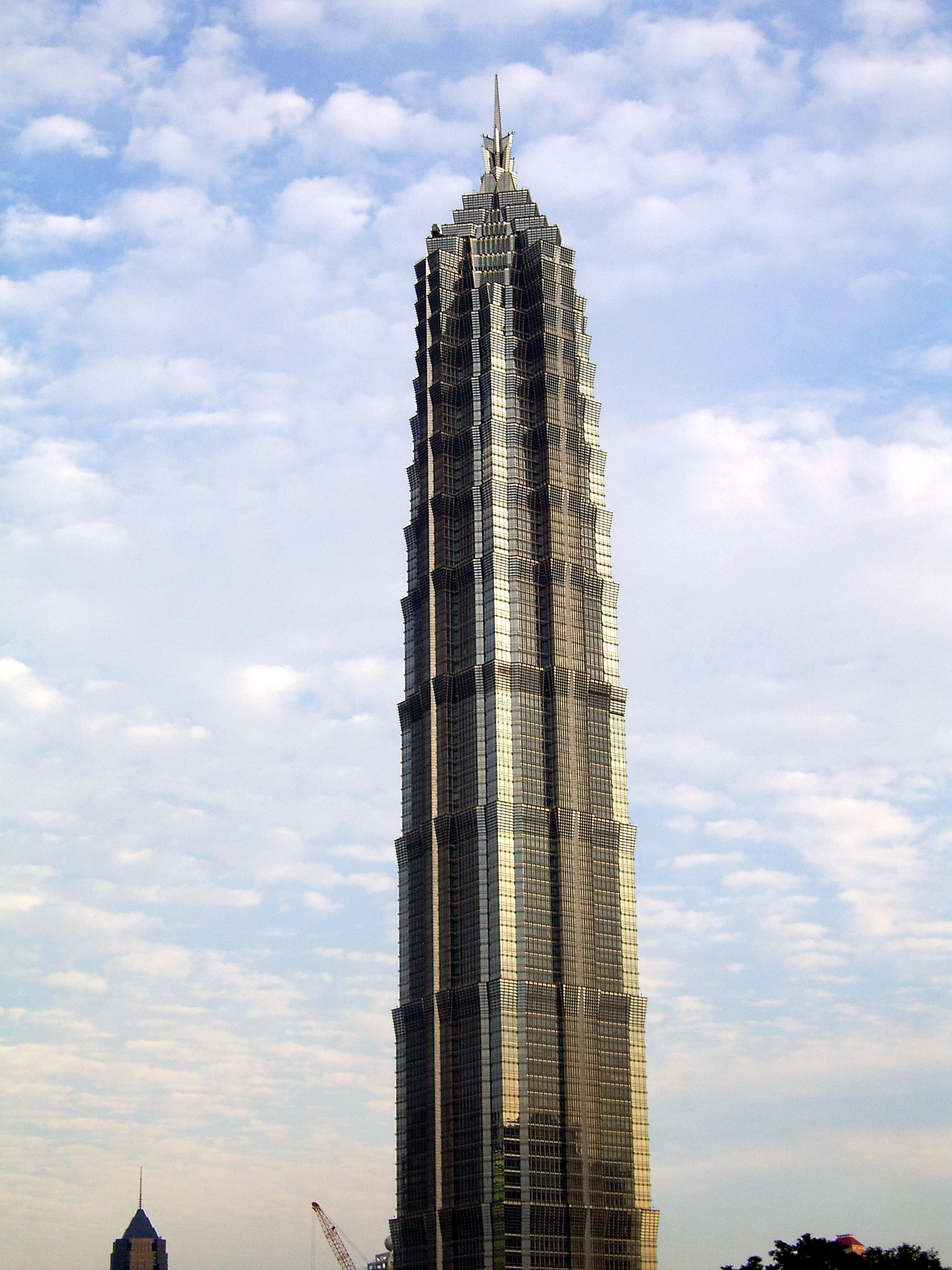
The Jin Mao Tower with the construction of the Shanghai World Financial Center at the background

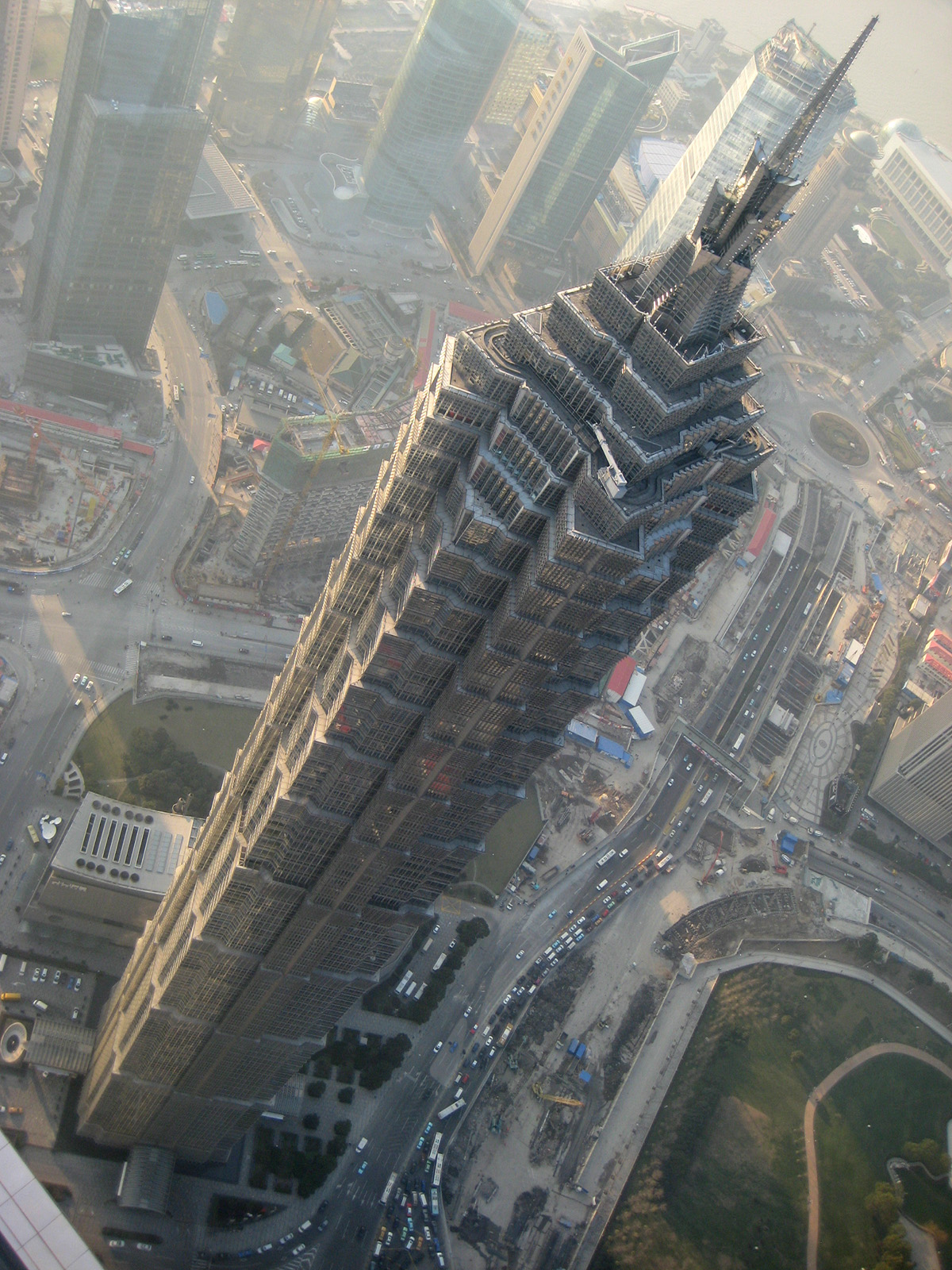
The Jin Mao Tower seen from the 100th floor of the Shanghai World Financial Center

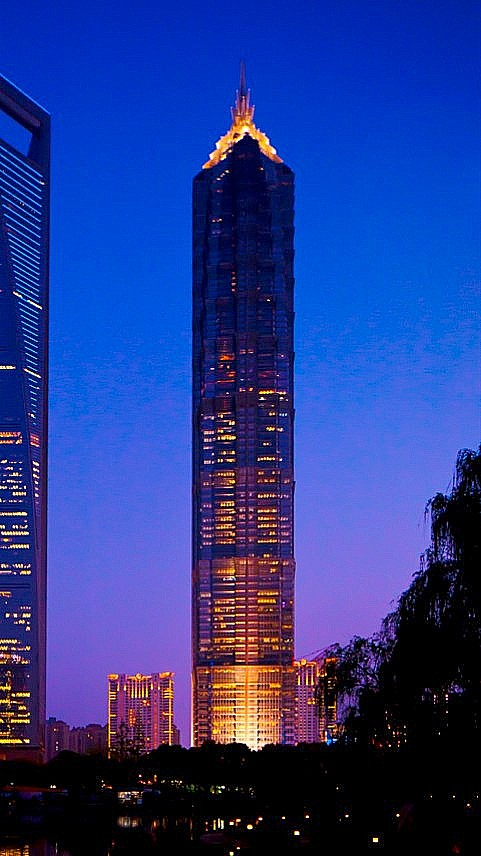
The Jin Mao Tower at night

== See also ==
- List of tallest buildings in Shanghai
- List of skyscrapers
- List of tallest buildings and structures in the world
- List of tallest freestanding structures in the world

== Notes ==
Records
Preceded by King Tower	Tallest Building in Shanghai; 1998 – 2007	Succeeded by Shanghai World Financial Center
