= Fordor =

Fordor may refer to

- A four-door automobile (as opposed to a "Tudor" two-door) in particular
  - Four-door sedan
  - Four-door coupé
  - Full-size Ford, some models have "Fordor" in their name
  - Ford C11ADF, army version called "Fordor" in Commonwealth countries
- In Bored of the Rings, the parody of Mordor

== See also ==
- Fodor (disambiguation)
