= China World Hotel, Beijing =

Hotel in Beijing, China

- 中国大饭店
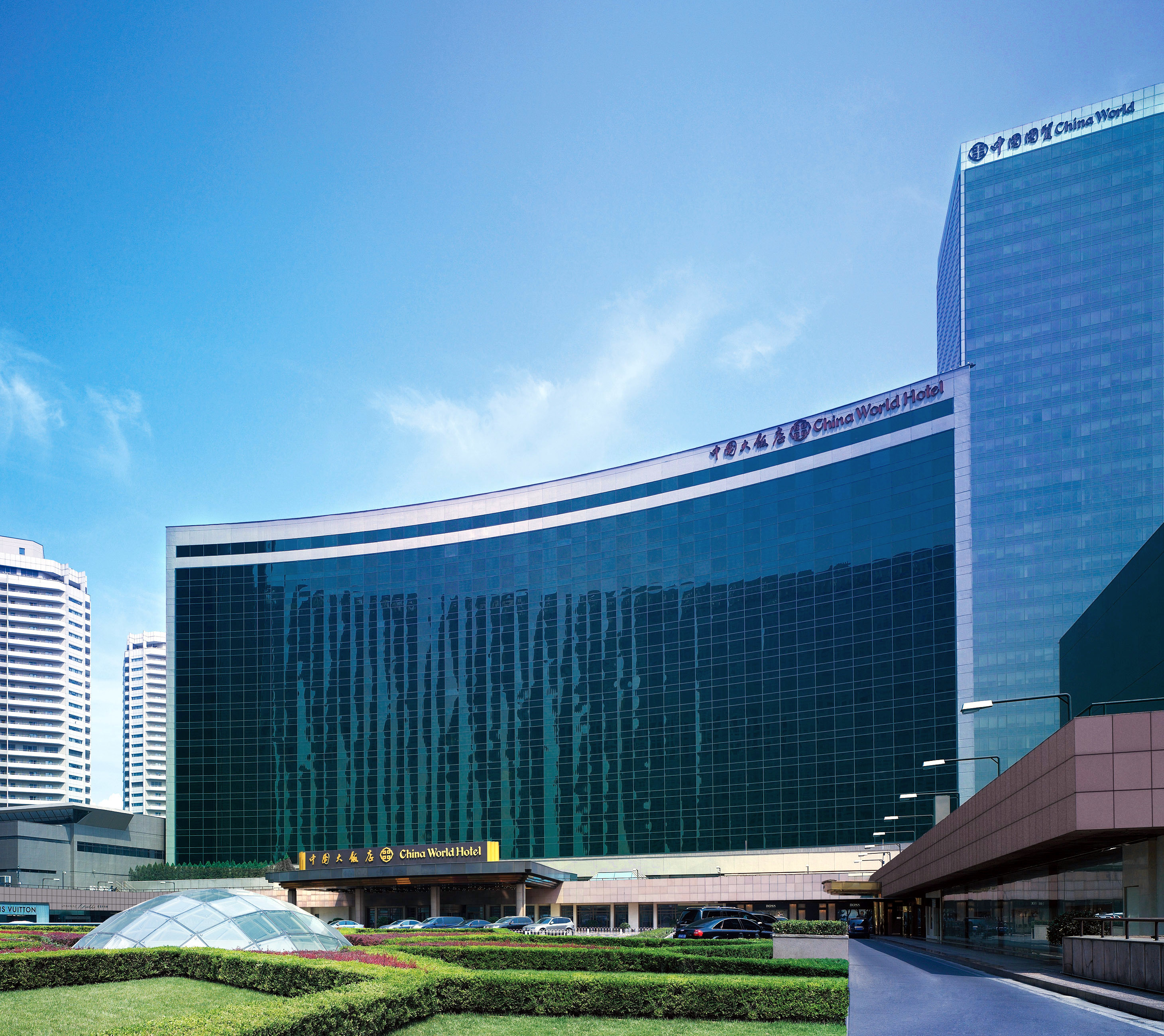
- Interactive map of the China World Hotel, Beijing area

General information
- Status: Completed
- Type: Hotel
- Location: No. 1 Jianguomenwai Avenue, Beijing, 100004, China
- Coordinates: 39.909580°N 116.459552°E
- Opening: August 1990
- Owner: Shangri-La Hotels
- Operator: John Rice

Design and construction
- Architects: Nikken Sekkei (Japan) and Fougerolle of Société Auxiliaires des Entreprises, (France)

Other information
- Number of rooms: 716

Website
- China World Hotel, Beijing official website

The China World Hotel, Beijing (Chinese: 中国大饭店) is a five-star hotel attached to the China World Mall and next to The China World Trade Center in Chaoyang District, the central business district of Beijing, China. It is operated by the Hong Kong–based Shangri-La Hotels and Resorts group (Chinese: 香格里拉酒店集團).

== History ==
The China World Hotel was built in 1989 and opened in August 1990, next to Guomao Subway Station in Beijing's Chaoyang District.

The hotel has a 2,000-capacity Conference Hall, and an 800-seat Grand Ballroom.

== Design and construction ==
The interior design was developed by LRF Designers Limited and renovated in 2003. Wilson Associates, led by Trisha Wilson, handled the renovation and employed "contemporary Asian artwork, soothing earthtone fabrics, and rich furnishings [to] unify traditional style with local character."

== Features ==
=== Rooms and suites ===
The rooms of the hotel were developed by LRF Designers Limited and number 716, of which, 622 are guest rooms, and 94 are Suites. Suites include the Premier (38), Executive (44), Grand Garden Suite (6), Specialty (4), Beijing Suite (1), and China Suite (1), which measures 280 square meters.

=== Restaurants ===
The hotel holds four specialty restaurants serving a variety of international cuisines, under Executive Chinese Chef Kenny Chan, as well as one bar, The Lobby Lounge, where live classical music is performed nightly.

- Aria – European

Aria is a European restaurant within the hotel that has been recognised by domestic and international media such as CNN, Time Out, Tatler, and Wine Spectator as one of the finest in the city. Led by Chef de cuisine David Pooley, it was previously run by then 27-year-old Australian chef Matthew McCool, who won "Chef of the Year" at the 2011 Time Out Beijing Awards. The restaurant includes elements of molecular gastronomy and is split into three areas – a dining and bar area on the first floor, private rooms on the second floor, and an alfresco space on the terrace. Pooley, also from Australia, joined the restaurant in June 2012, at the age of 28, having previously taken an apprenticeship at Sydney's multi-award winning Quay restaurant under celebrity chef Peter Gilmore.

- Giada Garden Restaurant – Italian

Giada Garden is a high-end Italian restaurant created by luxury brand GIADA, whose boutique in the hotel lobby is connected to the restaurant. Giada Garden offers an Italian menu with a contemporary twist by Chef Marino D'Antonio. The restaurant, with a sky garden, was designed by architect Claudio Silvestrin.

- Scene a Café – Open Kitchen

Scene a Café operates eight separate stations aimed at the diverse international guests of the hotel. Chef Li Yunfeng previously held figure art making classes from dough, at the café, where he would make figures such as The Monkey King Sun Wukong, Hello Kitty, the Goddess Guanyin, and Doraemon.

- The Sweet Spot – Delicatessen

Opened on January 8, 2014, in the lobby of the China World Office, The Sweet Spot is a bakery of European style food. Its technology allows it to "print in color on chocolate," allowing the store to custom make greeting cards as desserts. To inaugurate the store, a two-meter high cupcake tree made of 1,100 cakes was erected.

- Summer Palace – Cantonese

Run by Executive Chinese Chef Kenny Chan of Hong Kong and Sous Chef Hou Xin Qing of Yangzhou, Summer Palace was picked as the best restaurant in the city by the Beijing Tourism Administration in 2013, and restaurant of the year by Timeout Beijing in 2012.

== See also ==
- Shangri-La Hotels and Resorts
- List of hotels in Beijing
