= Fondazione Sandretto Re Rebaudengo =

Art foundation in Italy

The Fondazione Sandretto Re Rebaudengo is a non-profit contemporary arts institution based in Turin, Italy, founded by arts collector Patrizia Sandretto Re Rebaudengo in 1995.

== History ==
In 1995, Patrizia Sandretto Re Rebaudengo established the Fondazione Sandretto Re Rebaudengo, initially showing her growing collection in the family home at the Palazzo Re Rebaudengo in Guarene d'Alba.

In 2002, the Fondazione Sandretto Re Rebaudengo opened a low-built minimalist building in the Borgo San Paolo district in the urban center of Turin, as a dedicated art space. The building was previously a Fergat automobile factory before being converted into a contemporary arts space by architect Claudio Silvestrin, which opened to the public in 2002. The design of the building won a gold medal for Italian Architecture at the Milan Triennial in 2003.

In 2017, the foundation announced plans to open a venue in Nave 9 of Matadero Madrid, a 6,300 m^{2} (67,800 sq ft) space that was formerly a slaughterhouse. The space was to be designed by David Adjaye. By 2020, these plans were canceled, citing “structural problems” involved with the space in which it was to be set.

In 2018, Patrizia Sandretto Re Rebaudengo and her husband Agostino Re Rebaudengo purchased the island of San Giacomo in Paludo, including three powder magazines built in 1810 by Napoleon. Since 2022, it is being converted into an arts space.

== Commissions ==
The Fondazione Sandretto Re Rebaudengo regularly commissions artists to produce new work. Several commissions were shown at the Venice Biennale, such as Doug Aitken's eight-channel video installation Electric Earth in 1999, which won the international prize, and Alicja Kwade's WeltenLinie (2017). During the Venice Biennale in 2001, she had Maurizio Cattelan install a life-size replica of the Hollywood Sign in a garbage dump outside Palermo. Since 2017, the foundation has been collaborating with the Philadelphia Museum of Art to produce time-based works, with Rachel Rose and Martine Syms being the first artists chosen.

== Other programs ==
In addition to exhibitions, the Fondazione Sandretto Re Rebaudengo also strives to support the contemporary scene through several programs, such as their Young Curators' Residency Program (YCRP), which annually selects three recent graduates of international curatorial programs to research Italian contemporary art, and CAMPO (established in 2012), a curatorial course for students based in Italy.
