= Patrizia Sandretto Re Rebaudengo =

Italian art collector

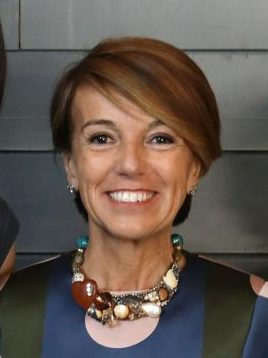
Patrizia Sandretto Re Rebaudengo

Patrizia Sandretto Re Rebaudengo (born Turin, 24 April 1959) is an Italian contemporary art collector, patron and private museum owner, known for her extensive collection, support of young artists, and her role in transforming cultural spaces. She is the president of the Fondazione Sandretto Re Rebaudengo.

== Early life ==
Sandretto Re Rebaudengo graduated in Economics and Commerce before venturing into contemporary art collecting in the early 1990s. Her journey into contemporary art began in 1992 during a trip to London, where she visited Anish Kapoor’s studio and met art world figures like Nicholas Logsdail of Lisson Gallery, Jay Jopling of White Cube, and future Tate director Nicholas Serota.

== Art spaces and collection ==
In 1995, she established the Fondazione Sandretto Re Rebaudengo, initially displaying her growing collection in her family home in Guarene. In 2002, she opened a dedicated art space in Turin, designed by Claudio Silvestrin.

Sandretto Re Rebaudengo owns an extensive collection of works of contemporary art and has supported and commissioned around 100 art projects. Her collection includes works by artists of her generation such as Carla Accardi and Mario Merz, younger artists like Avery Singer and Adrián Villar Rojas, around 1,000 pieces of costume jewelry, roughly 3,000 photographs, and works by major artists like Maurizio Cattelan and Damien Hirst. Her collection was showcased in 2023 at Palazzo Strozzi, Florence, in the exhibition “Reaching for the Stars,” celebrating the 30th anniversary of her collection.

== Contributions and influence ==
Sandretto Re Rebaudengo actively supports young artists, particularly through producing and commissioning new works. Her foundation collaborates with various institutions, including a partnership with the Philadelphia Museum of Art for time-based works.

Sandretto Re Rebaudengo sits on numerous boards, including the International Councils of New York’s Museum of Modern Art and London’s Tate.

== San Giacomo Island ==
In 2018, Sandretto Re Rebaudengo and her husband bought the island of San Giacomo in Paludo in the Venice lagoon. The island, abandoned since the 1960s, is being transformed into a multicultural center for culture and sustainability. The project includes artist residencies, exhibitions, performances, and research activities in sustainability and renewable energy, set to open for the 2024 Venice Biennale.

== Personal life ==
She is married to Agostino Re Rebaudengo, founder of Asja Ambiente Italia, a renewable energy company, and co-founder and vice-president of the Fondazione Sandretto Re Rebaudengo. They have two sons. She is also known for her collection of vintage American costume jewelry, which she has been collecting since the late 1980s.
