= Fairmont Beijing =

Hotel in Beijing

- 北京华彬费尔蒙酒店

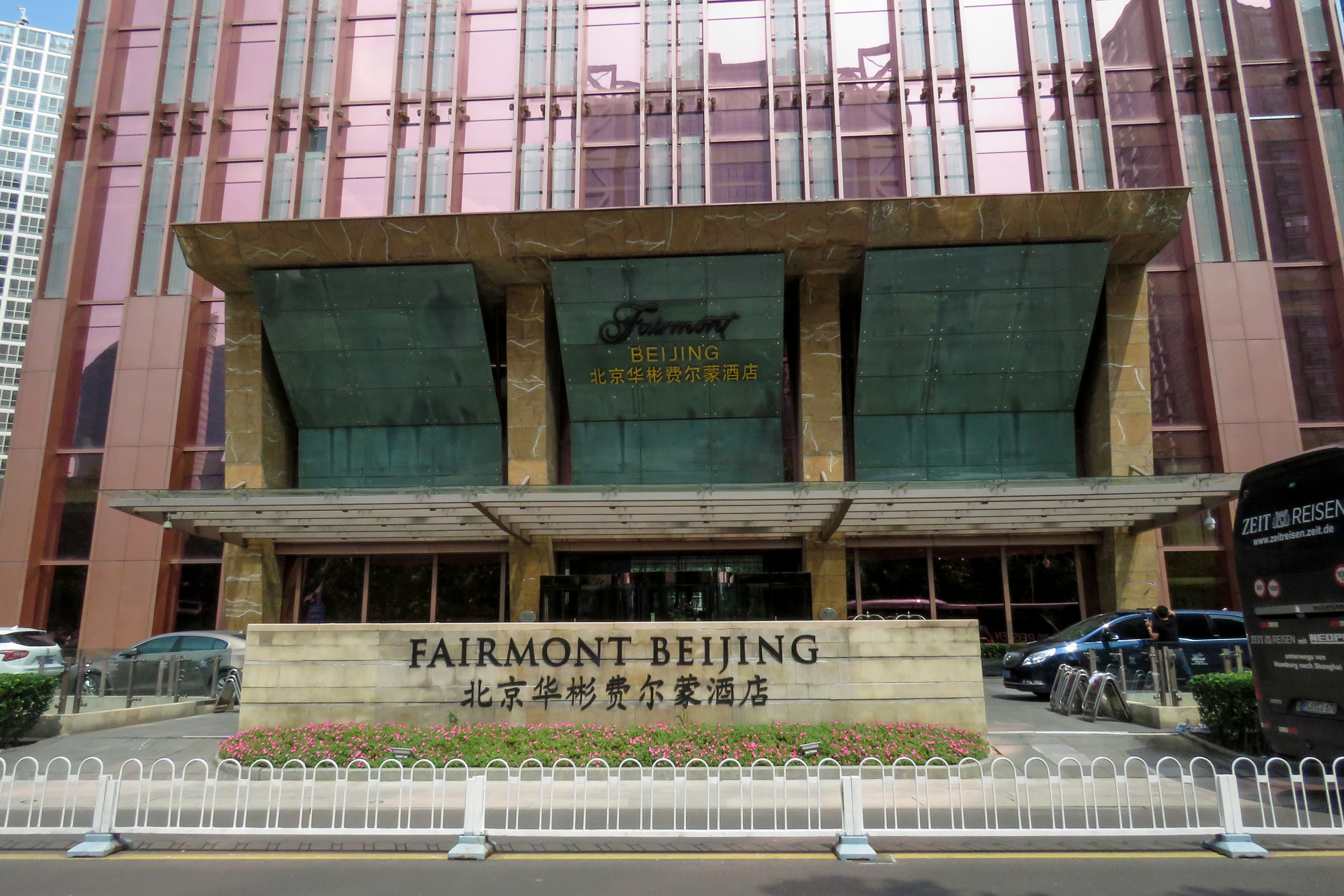
- Fairmont Beijing in 2018
- Interactive map of the Fairmont Beijing area

General information
- Location: Beijing Central Business District, Beijing, China, 8 Yong An Dong Li
- Coordinates: 39°54′15″N 116°26′45″E
- Opening: October 2010
- Owner: Reignwood Group
- Management: Fairmont Hotels and Resorts

Technical details
- Floor count: 25

Design and construction
- Architect: Tange Associates
- Developer: Reignwood Group

Other information
- Number of rooms: 222
- Number of suites: 24
- Number of restaurants: 5
- Parking: 300

Website
- www.fairmont.com/beijing

Chinese name
- Traditional Chinese: 北京華彬費爾蒙酒店
- Simplified Chinese: 北京华彬费尔蒙酒店
Transcriptions
Standard Mandarin
- Hanyu Pinyin: Běijīng huábīn fèiěrméng jiǔdiàn
Yue: Cantonese
- Jyutping: Bak^{1}ging^{1} waa^{4}ban^{1} fai^{3}ji^{5}mung^{4} zau^{2}dim^{3}

Fairmont Beijing (simplified Chinese: 北京华彬费尔蒙酒店; traditional Chinese: 北京華彬費爾蒙酒店) is a hotel in the Beijing central business district of China and is part of the Fairmont Hotels and Resorts brand.

Designed by Kenzō Tange's son, the architect Paul Tange, the hotel opened in October 2010. Its architecture mixes very modern design principles and Chinese features. The five-star hotel has 222 rooms and is 25 stories tall. It has several bars and restaurants including the steakhouse The Cut and the Cantonese cuisine-inspired Lunar 8. Its amenities include an indoor pool, a yoga studio, the Willow Stream Spa, and a gym.

== History ==
In September 2007, Reignwood Group and Fairmont Hotels and Resorts said that they would be building Fairmont Beijing, which was slated to be ready for business in the summer of the next year. The hotel, which was planned to be the first Fairmont hotel in China, opened in October 2010.

In 2012, Fairmont Beijing started purchasing organic produce from tiny farms near Te Ao Farm, a commune that employs intellectually disabled individuals as assistants to farmers and laborers at orchards. Roughly 70% of the hotel's fruits and vegetables come from the farms. Fairmont Beijing struck an agreement with the commune to employ one or more Te Ao Farm students, and the hotel pays the farms roughly 3% above the market rate. Writing of Fairmont Beijing, University of Exeter lecturer Fu Jia and his coauthors Jonathan Gosling and Morgan Witzel said in a 2017 Routledge-published book that "uniquely for any hotel in China" it has three workers who have learning disabilities.

== Location ==
Located in the Beijing central business district on the city's east, the five-star hotel is two blocks from the Yong'anli station on Line 1 of the Beijing Subway. Wangfujing, a retail district, is 10 minutes away by car. Taxis frequent the area. It is close to Tiananmen Square, the Forbidden City, Sanlitun, and the Temple of Heaven. Fodor's lauded the hotel for being very convenient for retail customers and those conducting business. The travel publisher said the downsides were that traffic could be "grueling" and offices were located all around the hotel.

== Architecture ==
Kenzō Tange's son, the architect Paul Tange, designed Fairmont Beijing. The 25-story hotel had a construction area that spanned 45,000 m^{2} (480,000 sq ft). The hotel's architecture mixes very modern design principles and Chinese features. A skyway that spans six stories links the hotel with the office and mixed-used building Reignwood Centre. According to that's Shanghai, it evokes the classic city gates of China. Stuart Dee of the Vancouver Sun said the hotel is "reminiscent of La Grande Arche in La Defense in Paris".

Made of glass, Fairmont Beijing's exterior has a rose and gold hue. The building is shaped like a bridge and has a glass curtain appearance. The two sides of the lobby feature golden-colored desks. Made of marble, the lobby is two stories and the entire ceiling is decorated with a ribbon fixture made of orange glass. Fairmont Beijing's reception area is adorned with three large paintings of pink lotus flowers. The atrium is decorated with contemporary Chinese pieces of art. According to Travel Weekly, compared to Beijing's various international hotels, Chinese culture has had a "far less subtle" impact on the property.

== Amenities ==
The hotel has 222 rooms. LTW, a design firm based in Singapore, devised the layout of the hotel rooms. Each room has a size of 40 m^{2} (430 sq ft) or more. They feature a combination of carpets and marble floors and windows that run from floor to ceiling. They are furnished with televisions in the bathtub and iPods. Bathrooms, which have heated floors, have Japanese-style toilets. Fairmont Beijing offers a pillow menu to allow guests to choose pillows. Fodor's said the hotel "stays just on the right side of tasteful". DestinAsian observed that the rooms had "panoramic urban vistas" and "rich embellishments like Chinese silks, original brushstroke paintings, and hand-carved lacquerware" that "create a plush imperial ambience". Observing the hotel's gold color scheme, DK found it "glamorous without being gaudy".

Fairmont Beijing features several restaurants and bars. The Cut, a steakhouse on the second floor, serves prime cuts of beef from Australia and Canada. Fodor's said the restaurant's steaks are "some of the finest (and priciest)" in Beijing. China Daily reviewer Jun Ye praised the restaurant, writing, "Both hotel and restaurant target the luxury-loving crowd, but they do offer commensurate good service" and "There were not many diners on the evening we ate at The Cut, but the quality of food and service definitely deserves much better patronage." Lunar 8 serves a buffet that is open the entire day. The Cantonese cuisine-themed restaurant serves Peking duck. It allows customers to join the chef in carving up the duck and observe at the open kitchen how the duck is roasted. Citing the dishes chicken and ginseng boiled twice, hot sauce flavored sauteed codfish, and sauteed calamari paired with Tieguanyin, reviewer Jun Ye of the China Daily wrote, "The restaurant's chef is innovative, and has come up with his own interpretation of traditional Chinese dishes." The Champagne Bar serves bar food that has a Chinese influence as well as distinct cocktails. that's Shanghai said the bar "showcases a wide selection of bubbly elixirs plus a solid range of fine wines and signature molecular cocktails to die for".

The hotel offers the more expensive Fairmont Gold booking option, which gives guests access to a concierge, a lounge, more amenities. On the 20th floor in the skybridge, the hotel has the Fairmont Gold Club for these guests that has meeting rooms and a seating area. In the skybridge, the 21st floor has an indoor pool, a yoga studio, the Willow Stream Spa, a gym, and locker rooms that have a steam rooms. Customers can undergo services for their face and body at the spa, which has 12 rooms and occupies three of the skybridge's stories. The spa offers both Chinese and Western treatments.

The hotel offers lime-green BMW bikes for customers' commuting use and a bilingual app called "Ride Beijing" (Chinese: 骑游北京) with ideas about where to go such as hutongs. Justin Bergman of The New York Times said the hotel offers "excellent English-speaking service". Fairmont Beijing houses a museum containing its proprietor's art and wine collection. Guests can take tai chi classes from an expert, who teaches about the martial art's history and movements.

== See also ==
- List of hotels in Beijing
