= Silvestrin =

Silvestrin is a surname of Italian origin. Notable people with the surname include:

- Claudio Silvestrin (born 1954), Italian architect and designer
- Enrico Silvestrin (born 1972), Italian actor and media personality
