= Minzu Hotel =

Large inn in Beijing

Coordinates: 39.90642°N 116.360858°E

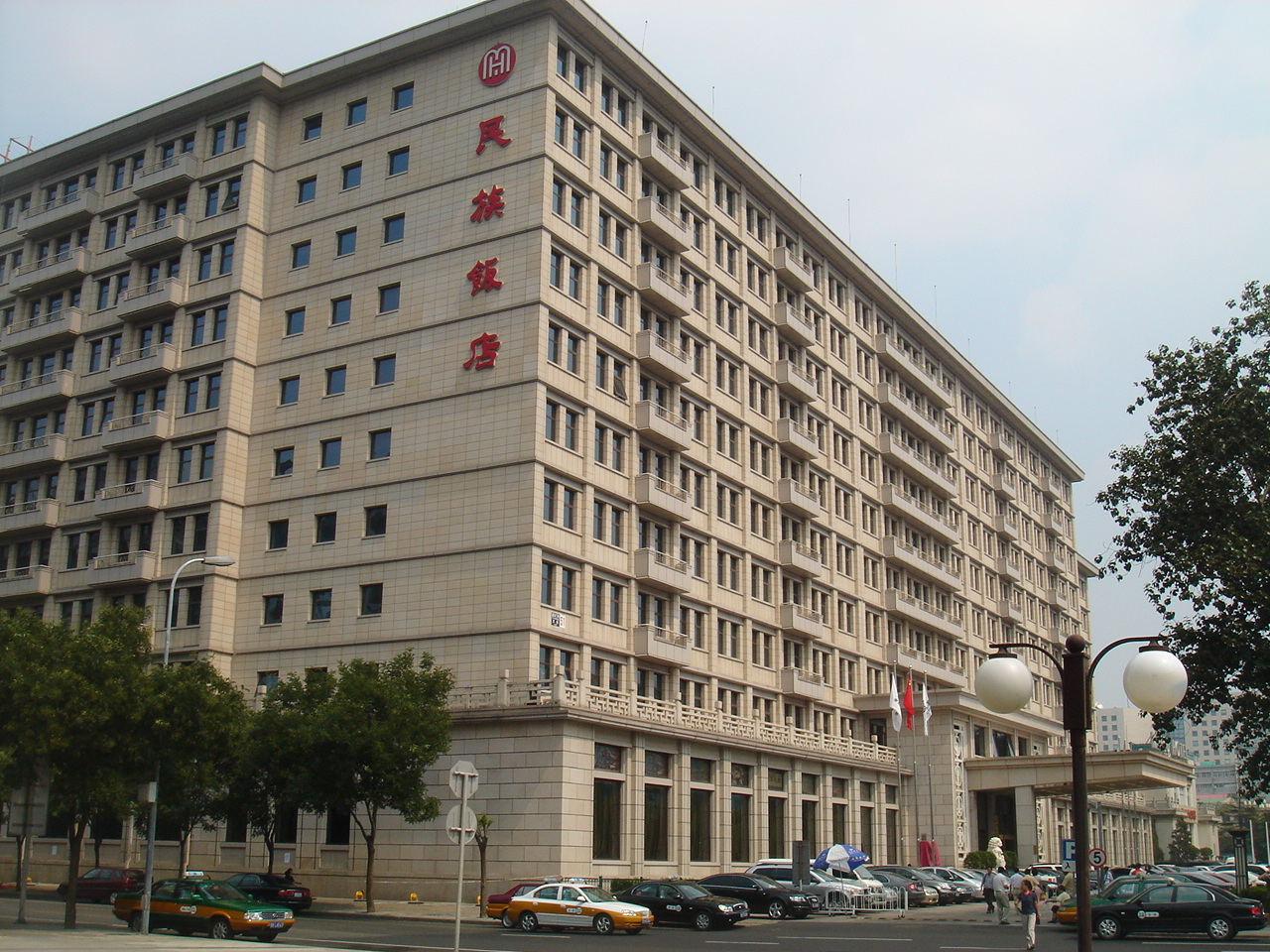
- The Minzu Hotel
- Interactive map of the Minzu Hotel area

General information
- Location: West Chang'an Avenue, Xicheng District, Beijing, China
- Opened: 1959

Technical details
- Floor count: 10

The Minzu Hotel (Chinese: 民族饭店; pinyin: Mínzú Fàndiàn, literally "Nationalities Hotel") is located on West Chang'an Avenue, in Xicheng District, Beijing, China. Opened in 1959, it was one of the Ten Great Buildings of Beijing in the 1950s, and has hosted numerous foreign delegations. It is also a common place for press conferences. The 10-story 4 star hotel has 507 rooms.

== See also ==
- List of hotels in Beijing
