= Lusongyuan Hotel =

Courtyard hotel in Beijing, China

Coordinates: 39.9346°N 116.4063°E

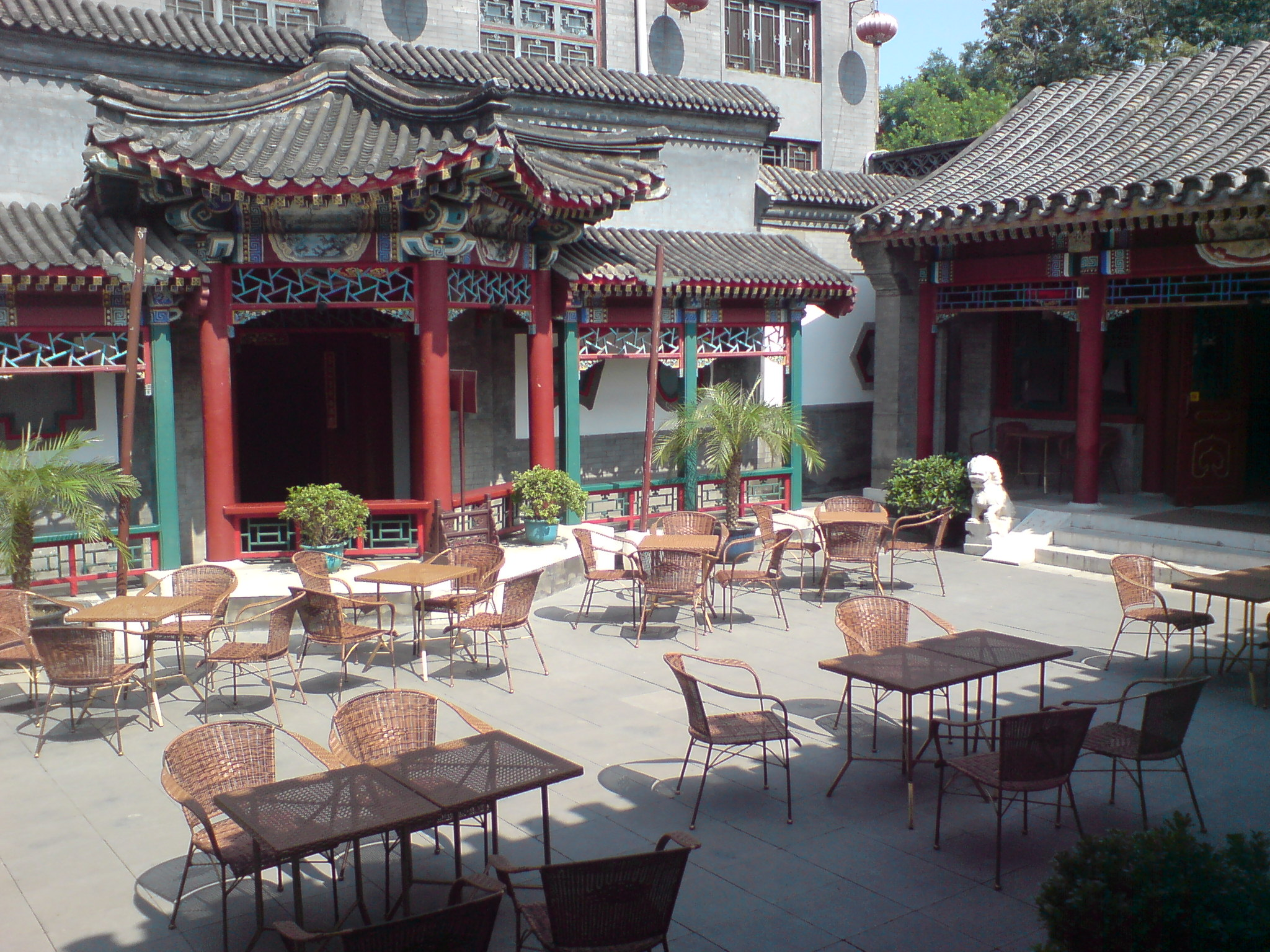
The hotel is converted from a classic 19th century traditional courtyard house

Lusongyuan Hotel is a 3-star traditional courtyard hotel in Beijing, China. The Hotel lies in the central district of Beijing, in an old-styled Hutong in the eastern part of the city. It is surrounded by many historical buildings built from the Yuan, Ming and Qing dynasties that are still preserved today. Hutongs and quadrangles are typical Beijing architectural structures featured here. Hutongs are ancient styled lanes unique to Beijing. Quadrangles are the main structures inside hutongs. The hotel has around 60 rooms with costs ranging from 500 yuan to 1000 yuan per night. The hotel was historically the residence of a defense minister and general of the Qing dynasty.

== Honors ==
The hotel is nominated as one of "the most distinctive courtyard" in 2009 by Beijing Tourism Industry Association. The hotel is highly popular, with many overseas guests come to the hotel, mainly to have a taste of traditional Chinese culture.

== See also ==
- Hutong
- List of hotels in Beijing
