= List of hotels in Beijing =

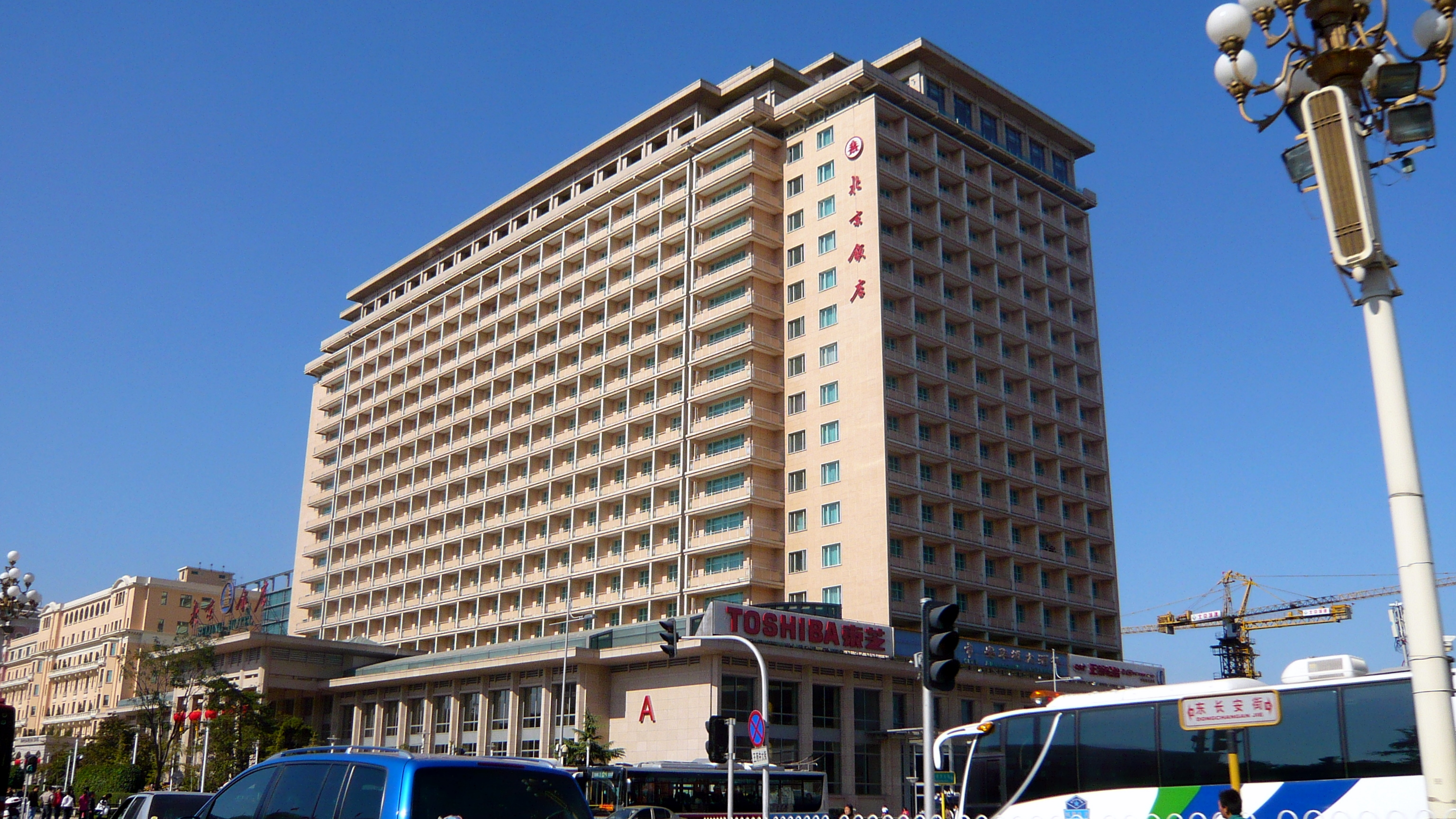
The Beijing Hotel

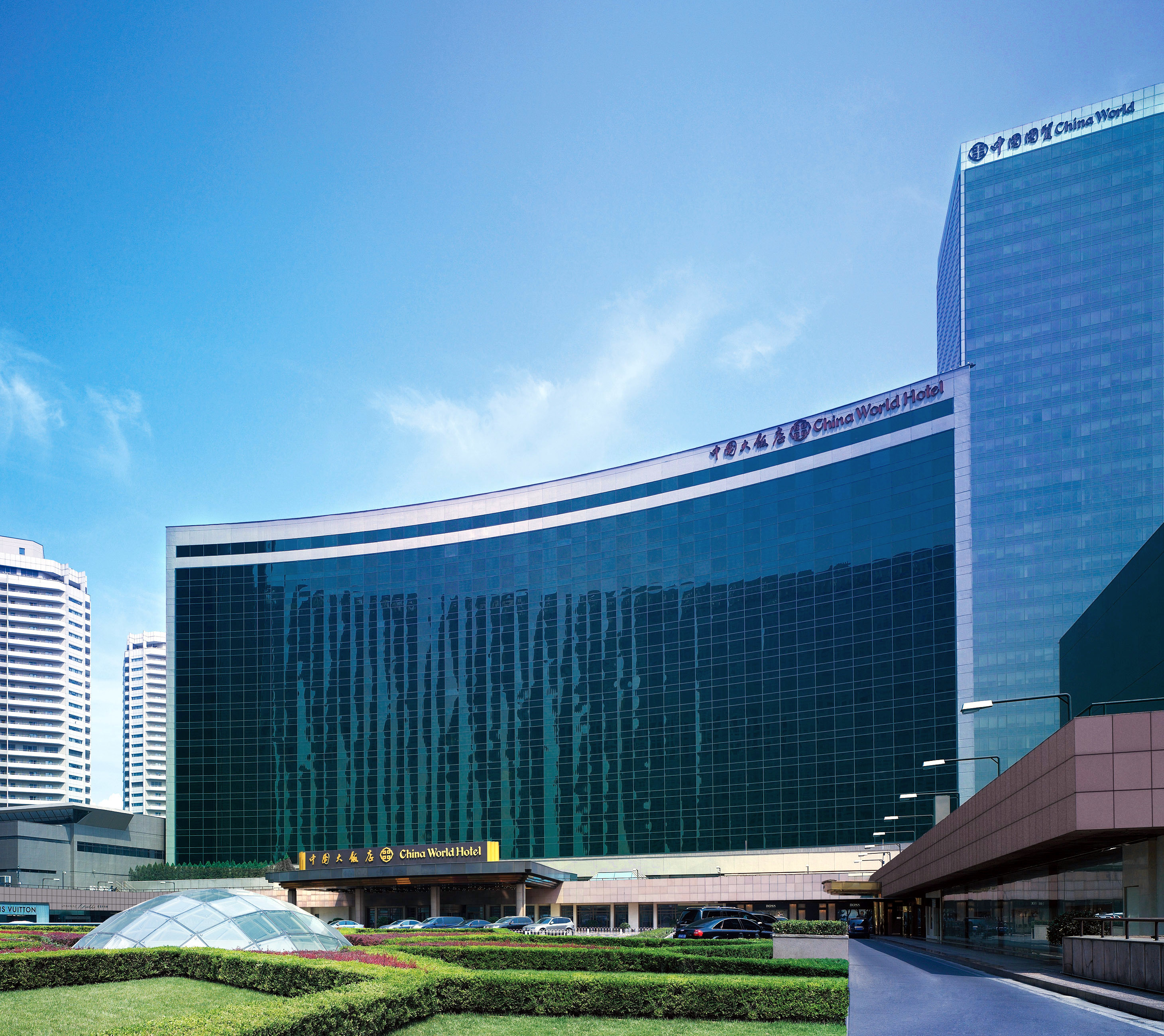
The China World Hotel in Beijing

This is a partial list of hotels in Beijing.

== Hotels in Beijing ==
- Beijing Hotel
- China World Hotel, Beijing
- Diaoyutai State Guesthouse
- Fairmont Beijing
- Grand Hyatt Beijing
- Jingxi Hotel
- Lusongyuan Hotel
- Minzu Hotel
- Morgan Plaza

== See also ==
- Lists of hotels – an index of hotel list articles on Wikipedia
