= Grand Hyatt Beijing =

Hotel in Dongcheng district, Beijing, China

Coordinates: 39°54′28″N 116°24′29″E

Grand Hyatt Beijing at Oriental Plaza
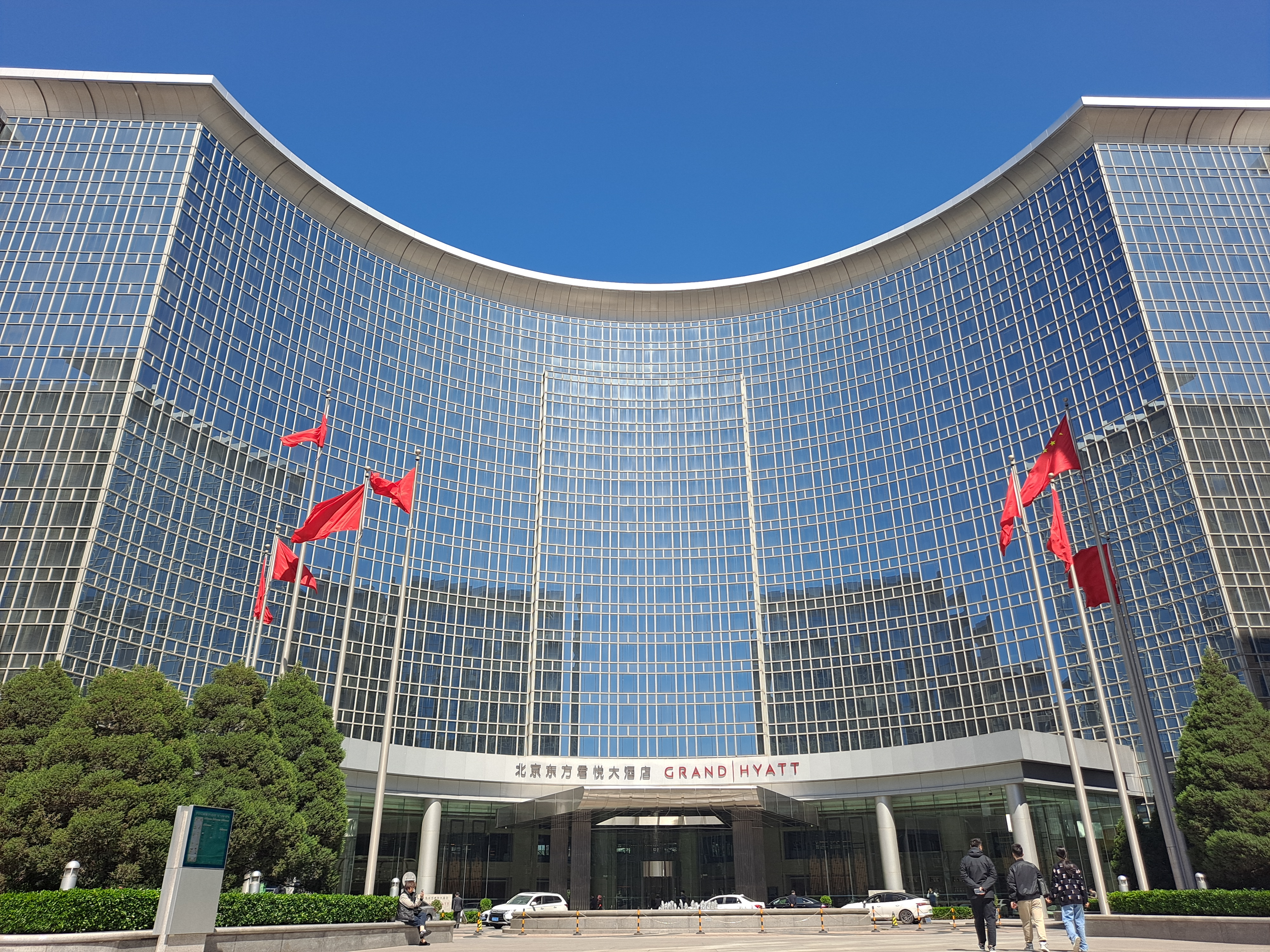
- Photo of the entrance of the hotel
- Location: 1 East Chang An Avenue, Beijing 100738, People's Republic of China
- Operator: Hyatt Hotels Corporation

Grand Hyatt Beijing (simplified Chinese: 北京东方君悦大酒店; traditional Chinese: 北京東方君悅大酒店; pinyin: Běijīng Dōngfāng Jūnyuè Dàjiǔdiàn) is an 518-room luxury hotel in Beijing, China operated by the Hyatt Hotels Corporation that opened in October 2001. It is located at the crossroads of Chang'an Avenue and Wangfujing, and is part of the Oriental Plaza, China's largest commercial complex, owned by Li Ka-shing. There are a total of five food and beverage outlets, including 'Made in China', 'SHUO', 'Balcony', 'Fountain Lounge', and the 'Patisserie'. 'Made in China' was awarded the Michelin Plate in the 2020 and 2021 editions of the Beijing Michelin Guide.

The hotel was originally planned to be opened in August 2001 under the management of Li's Harbour Plaza Hotel, but a desire for a more "international" manager led to Hyatt getting the rights to manage the hotel by investors. It was well received after opening, winning 30 awards over the following five years.

== Club Oasis ==
The hotel's fitness and pool facilities are called the 'Club Oasis.' Located in the basement of the hotel, the Club contains a 1,500-square-meter indoor pool, surrounded by plants and trees. Lounge chairs and cabanas are available alongside the pool. The gym features treadmills, ellipticals, and weight-lifting equipment.

== Grand Club ==
Entrance of the Grand Hyatt Beijing Grand Club

Similar to other Grand Hyatt hotels globally, this property has a Grand Club on the 17th floor with breakfast, meeting rooms, and concierge service.

== Notable visits ==
In October 2008, then-German chancellor Angela Merkel stayed at the presidential suite of the hotel on a state visit to China. In December 2013, then-British prime minister David Cameron gave a speech at the Grand Ballroom of the hotel.

== See also ==
- List of hotels in Beijing
