= Beijing Hotel =

Hotel complex in Beijing, China

Coordinates: 39.907745°N 116.403987°E

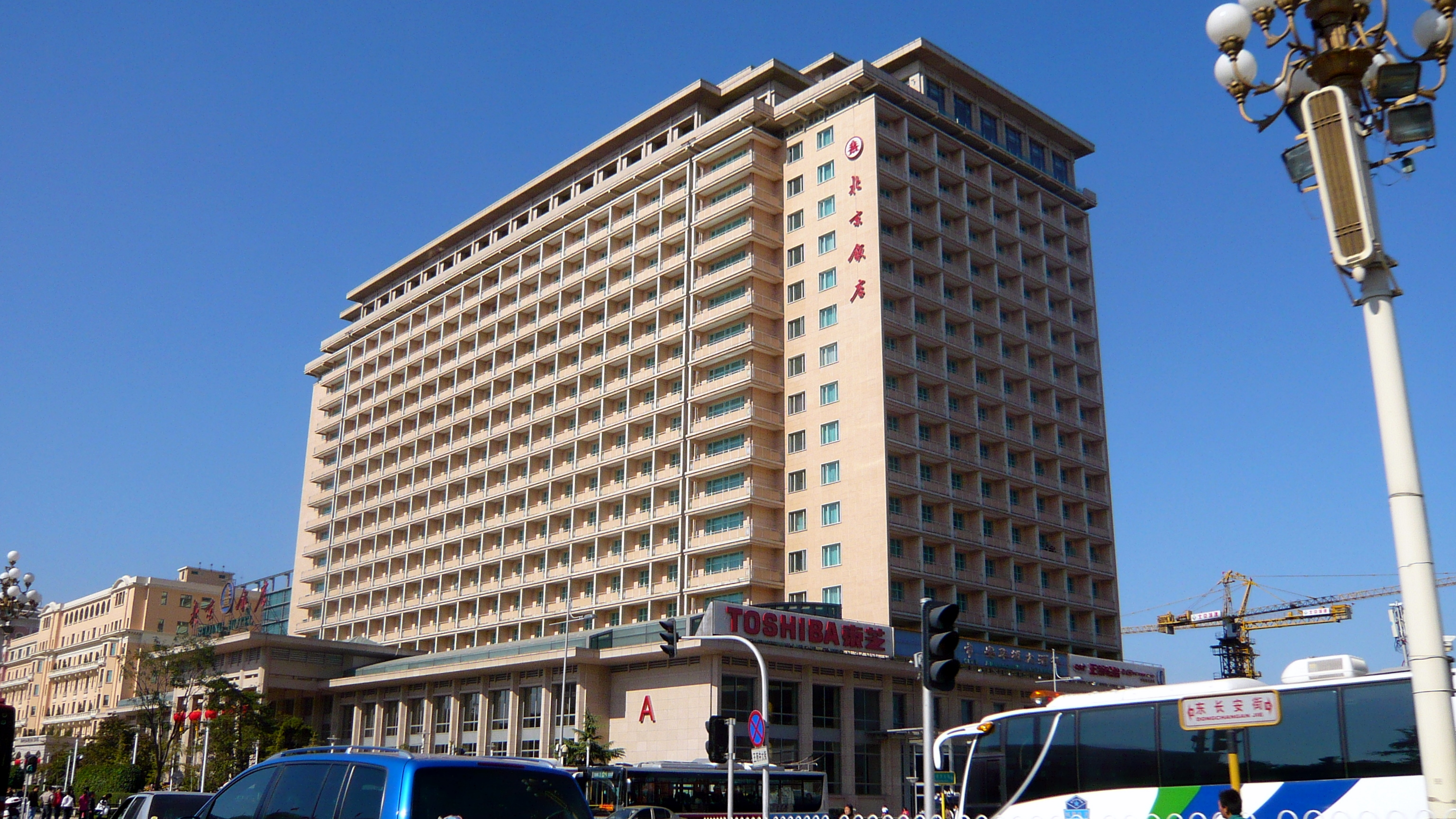
Beijing Hotel, Block D, built in 1974

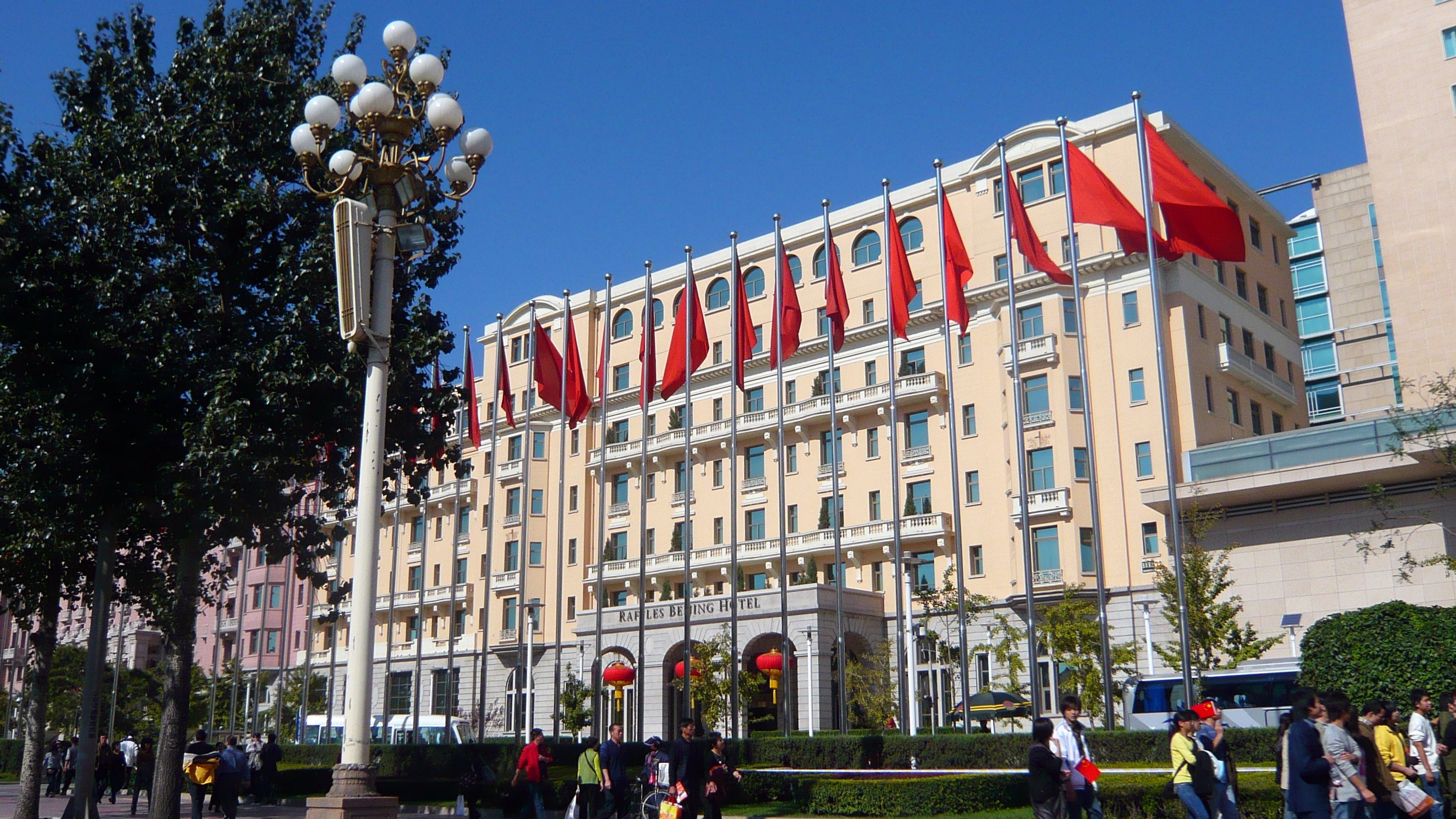
Beijing Hotel NUO, Block B of the Beijing Hotel, built in 1917

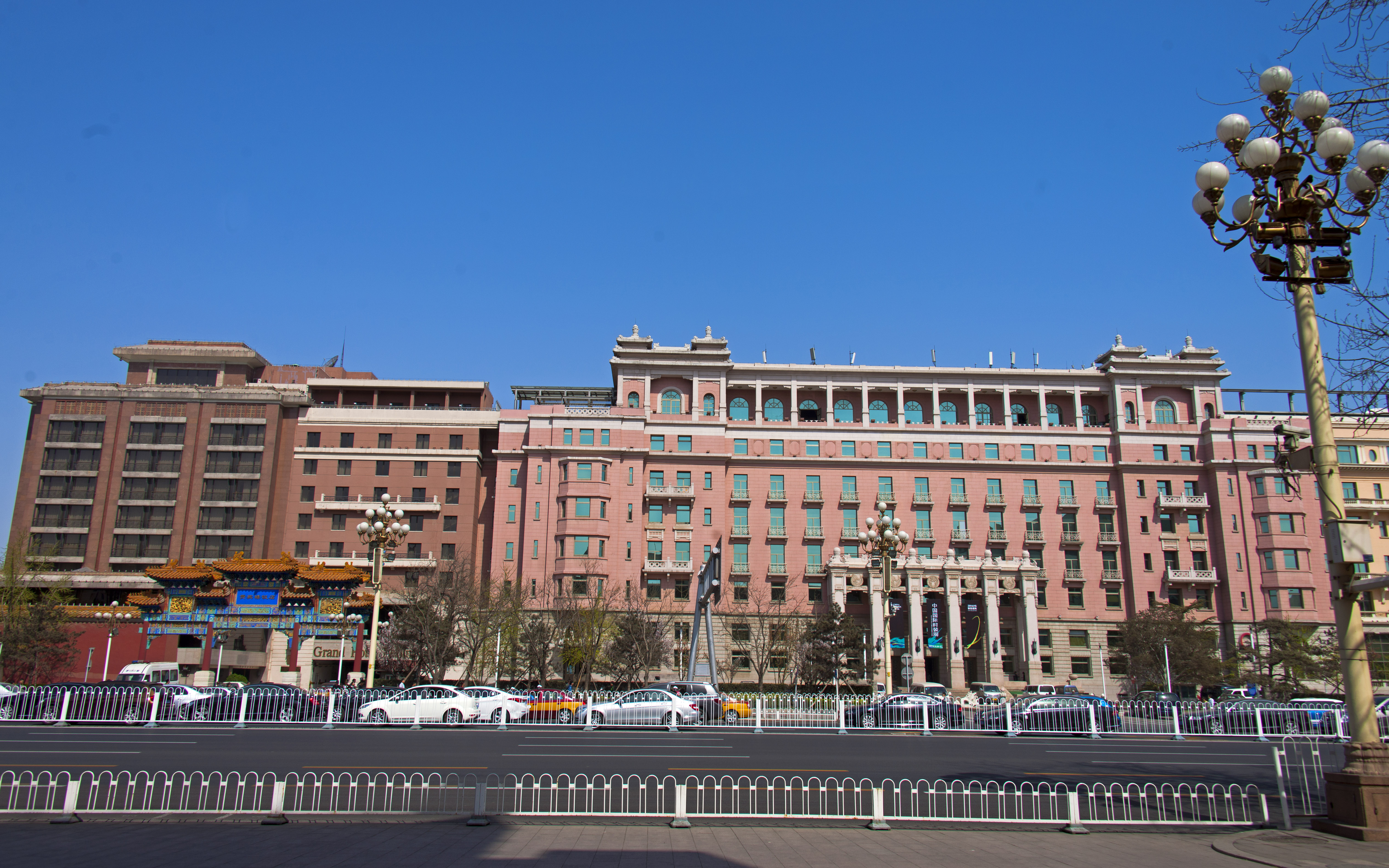
Block C, now the Grand Hotel Beijing, built in 1954

The Beijing Hotel (Chinese: 北京饭店; pinyin: Běijīng Fàndiàn) is a five-star state-owned hotel complex in the Dongcheng District of Beijing, China. It is located at the southern end of Wangfujing Street, at the corner with East Chang'an Avenue, 1.5 km from Beijing railway station with views of the Forbidden City and part of Tiananmen Square.

== Overview ==
The first wing of the Grand Hôtel de Pékin, a five-story red brick structure, was completed in 1915. A second wing, today known as Block B, was completed in 1917, making the hotel one of the oldest in Beijing. In 1933 Zhang Jingyao was shot in the building by an assassin. Following the July 7 incident in 1937, the hotel was taken over by Japanese forces and later by the Kuomintang government. Later, the banquet hall served guests such as Mao Zedong and Zhou Enlai at the inauguration of the People's Republic.

A new wing was added on the west side of the 1917 wing of the Beijing Hotel in 1954, it is today known as Block C. The original red brick 1915 wing was demolished for the construction of Block D, on the east, in 1974. At 89 meters, the tower was the tallest building in Beijing at the time. Finally, Block E was built directly behind the 1917 wing in 2001.

The hotel complex today operates under three separate names. In April 2005, Raffles Hotels and Resorts Limited signed an agreement with the Beijing Tourism Group (BTG), to re-brand and manage the historic 1917 Block B in the middle and the modern Block E behind it under the Raffles brand. After carrying out renovations and refurbishment, that portion of the complex was re-launched as Raffles Beijing Hotel (simplified Chinese: 北京饭店莱佛士; traditional Chinese: 北京飯店萊佛士; pinyin: Běijīng Fàndiàn Láifóshì) in 2006. The contract ended in 2016 and those blocks were renamed Beijing Hotel NUO on December 1, 2016. Block C, on the left, is today the Grand Hotel Beijing. The towering Block D, on the right, is today the only remaining wing to use the name Beijing Hotel.

The hotel usually caters to foreigners and wealthy domestic guests, providing restaurants and bars in a Western and Asian style. Various members of state have stayed there, including Richard Nixon, U Nu, Nikita Khrushchev, Ho Chi Minh and Sun Yat-sen. The hotel has been awarded the Five Star Diamond Award for consecutive years. During the 2008 Summer Olympics and the 2022 Winter Olympics, the hotel served as the headquarters of the International Olympic Committee.

== Significance ==
Many foreign journalists were based in the hotel during the spring of 1989. This was the site where Associated Press photographer Jeff Widener took the famous "Tank Man or Unknown Rebel" picture during the Tiananmen Square protests. According to journalist Zhang Boli, the last meetings between the students and government took place at the hotel on May 30, 1989, where no agreement was reached.

== See also ==
- List of hotels in Beijing

== Gallery ==
Beijing Hotel

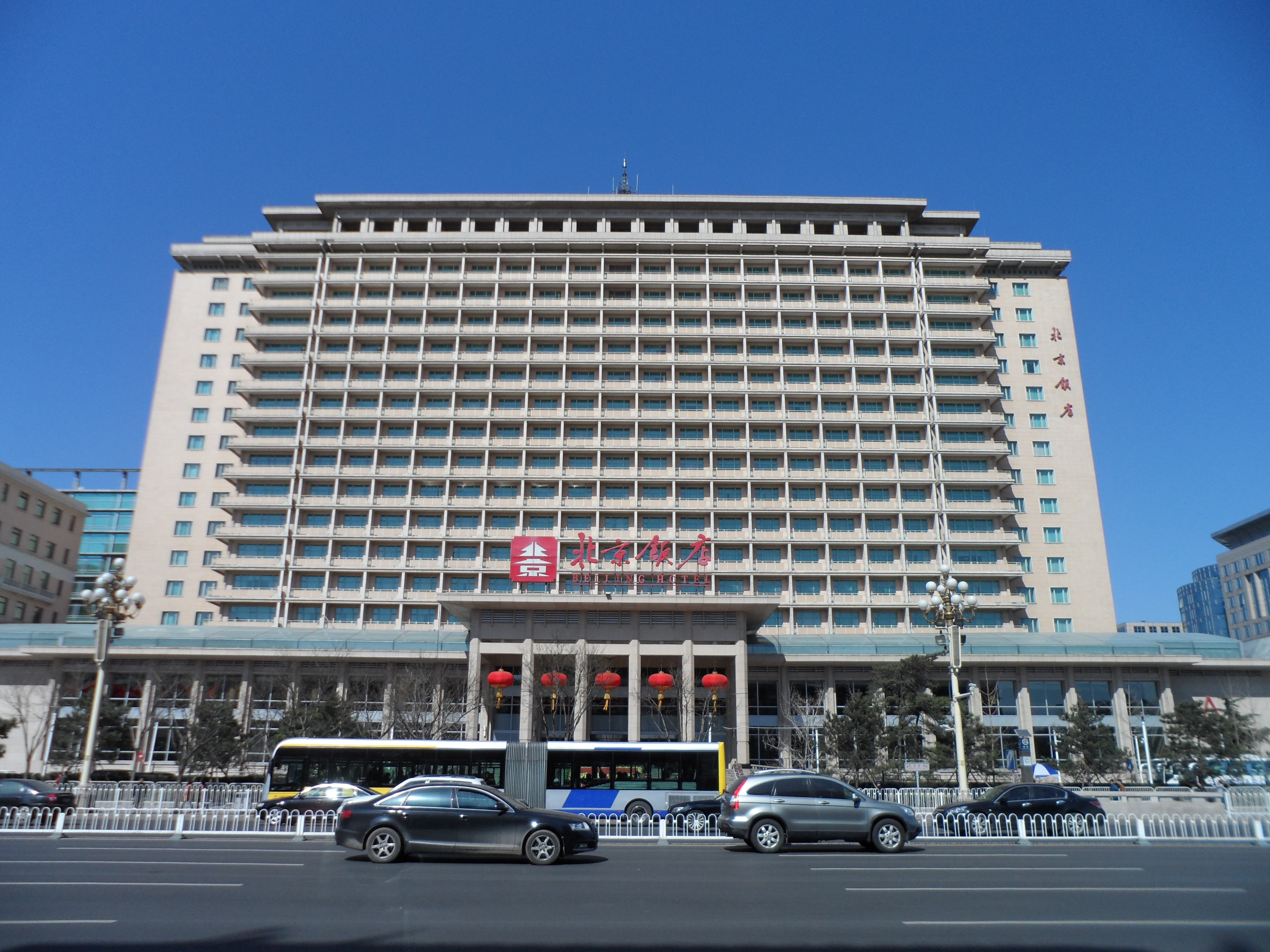
Beijing Hotel, Block D

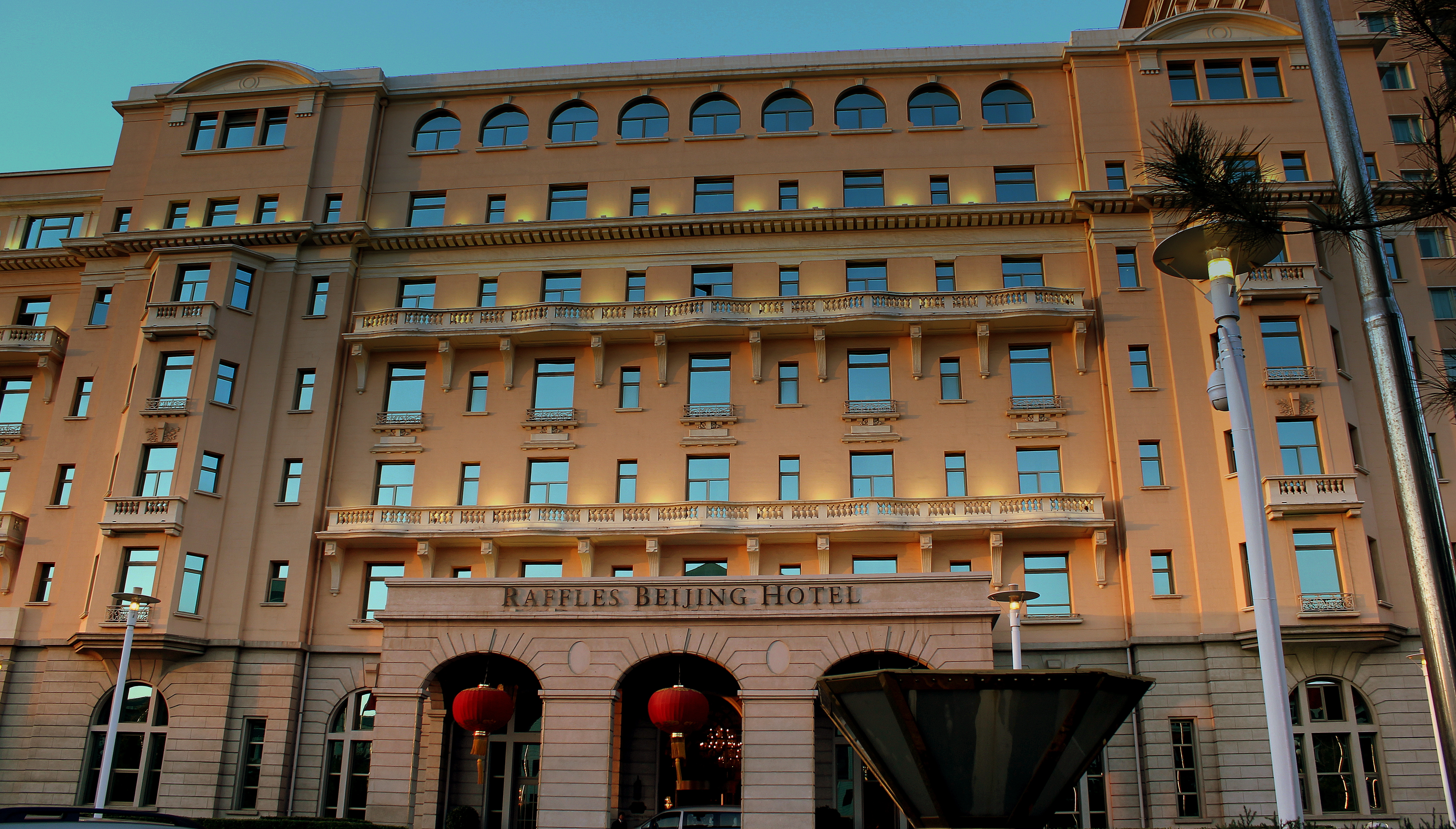
Beijing Hotel NUO, Block B

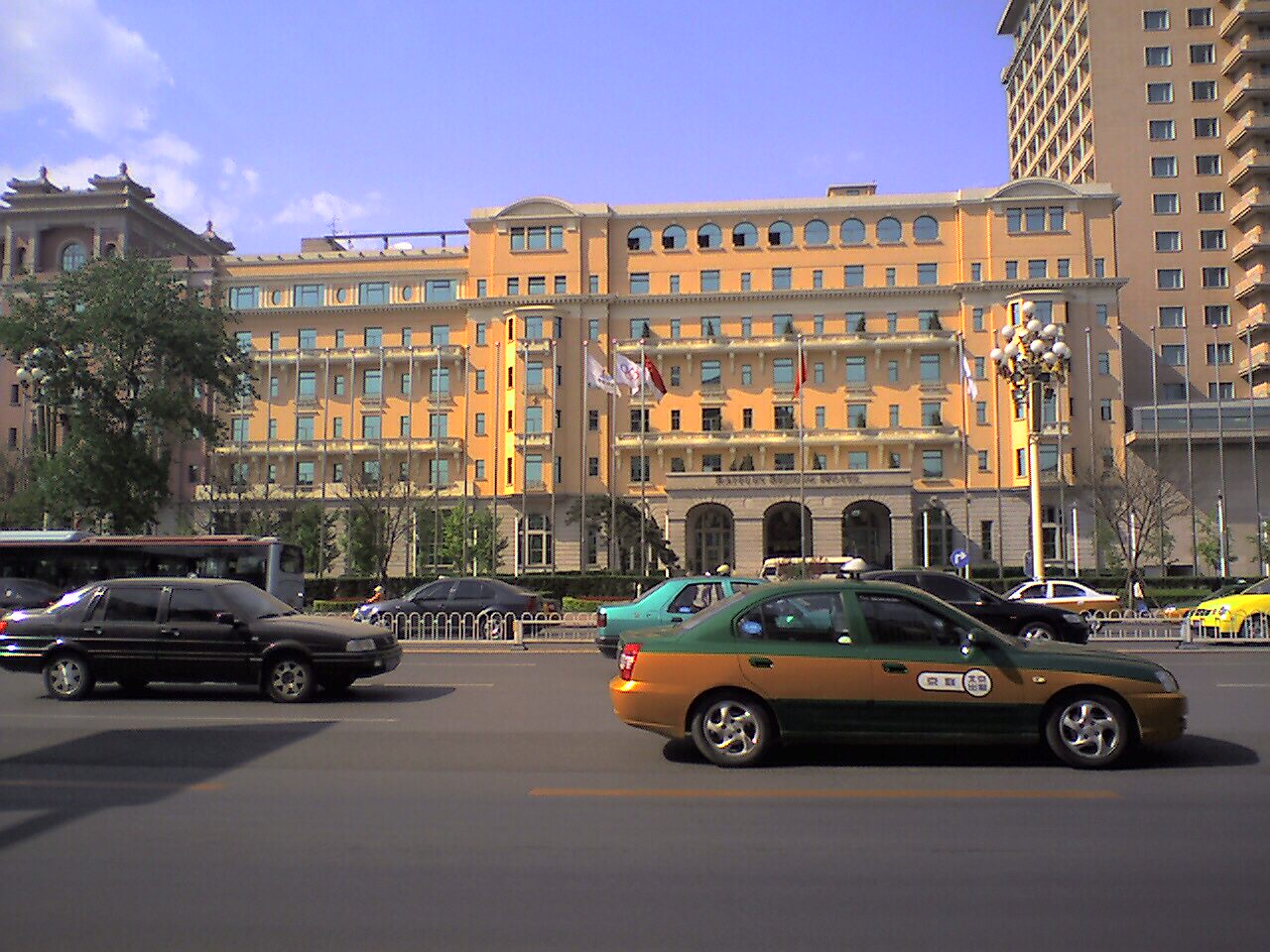
Beijing Hotel NUO, Block B
