= Ten Great Buildings =

Public works projects initiated by Mao Zedong

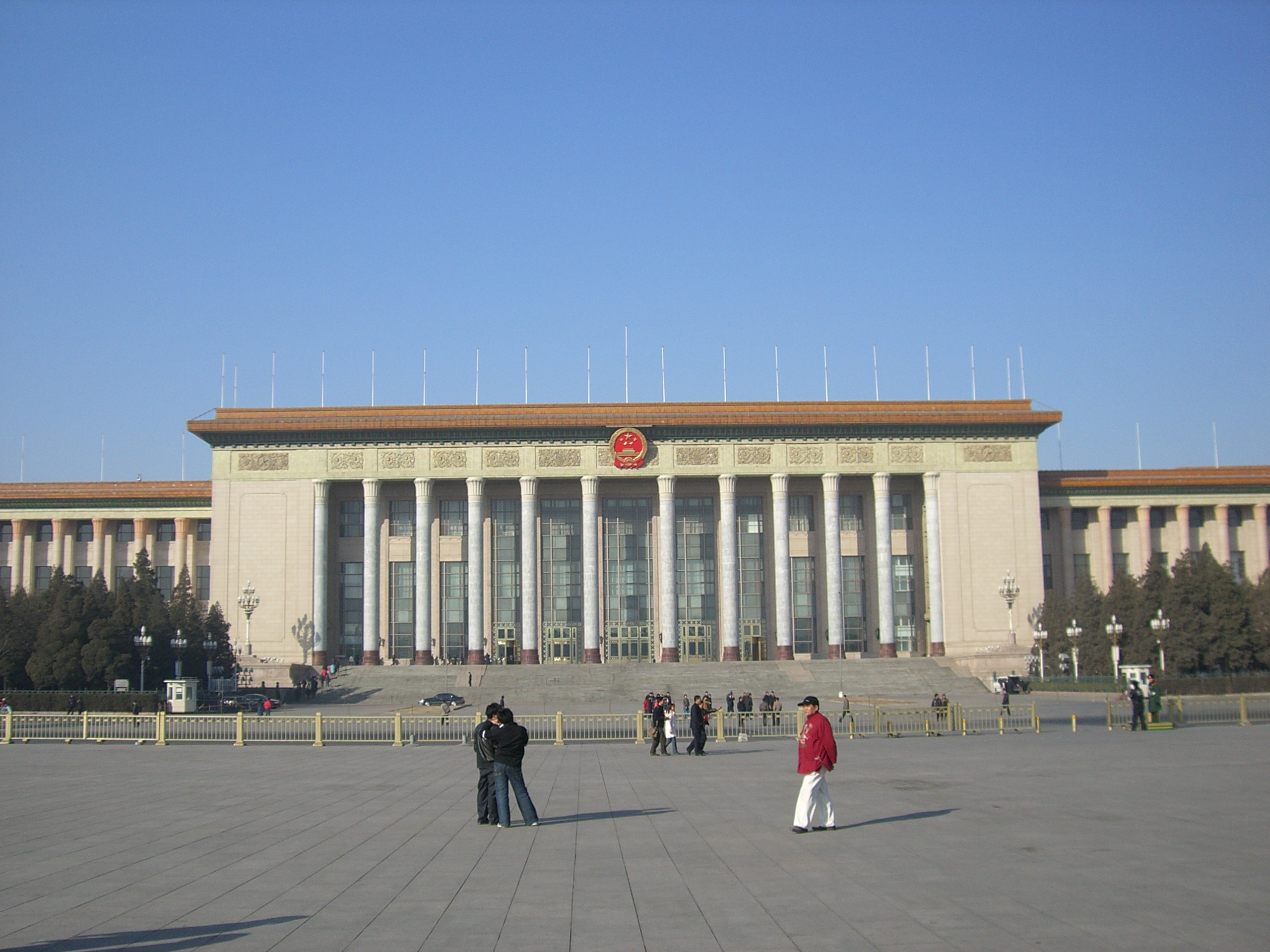
Great Hall of the People

The Ten Great Buildings (Chinese: 十大建筑) are ten public buildings that were built in Beijing in 1959, to commemorate the tenth anniversary of the founding of the People's Republic of China. They were part of an architecture and urbanism initiative of Chairman of the Chinese Communist Party Mao Zedong's Great Leap Forward; most of the buildings were largely completed in a time span of ten months, by the deadline of 1 October 1959. In addition to the construction of these buildings, there was also an expansion of Tiananmen Square, and a campaign of art commissions to decorate the majority of the buildings by the time of their completion. Two subsequent art campaigns for these buildings were conducted in 1961, and 1964–1965. The buildings' styles reflect the influence of modernism, socialist realism, and traditional Chinese styles.

The Ten Great Buildings transformed Beijing. These monumental new buildings, constructed on a grand scale and providing modern facilities and services, helped to establish and celebrate an image of Mao Zedong's New China. They redefined Beijing as modern and up-to-date, a part of the international socialist vision of the future, and yet still distinctively Chinese; perhaps most important, as a city comparable to other globally important "superpower" capitals such as London, Washington, D.C., and Moscow.

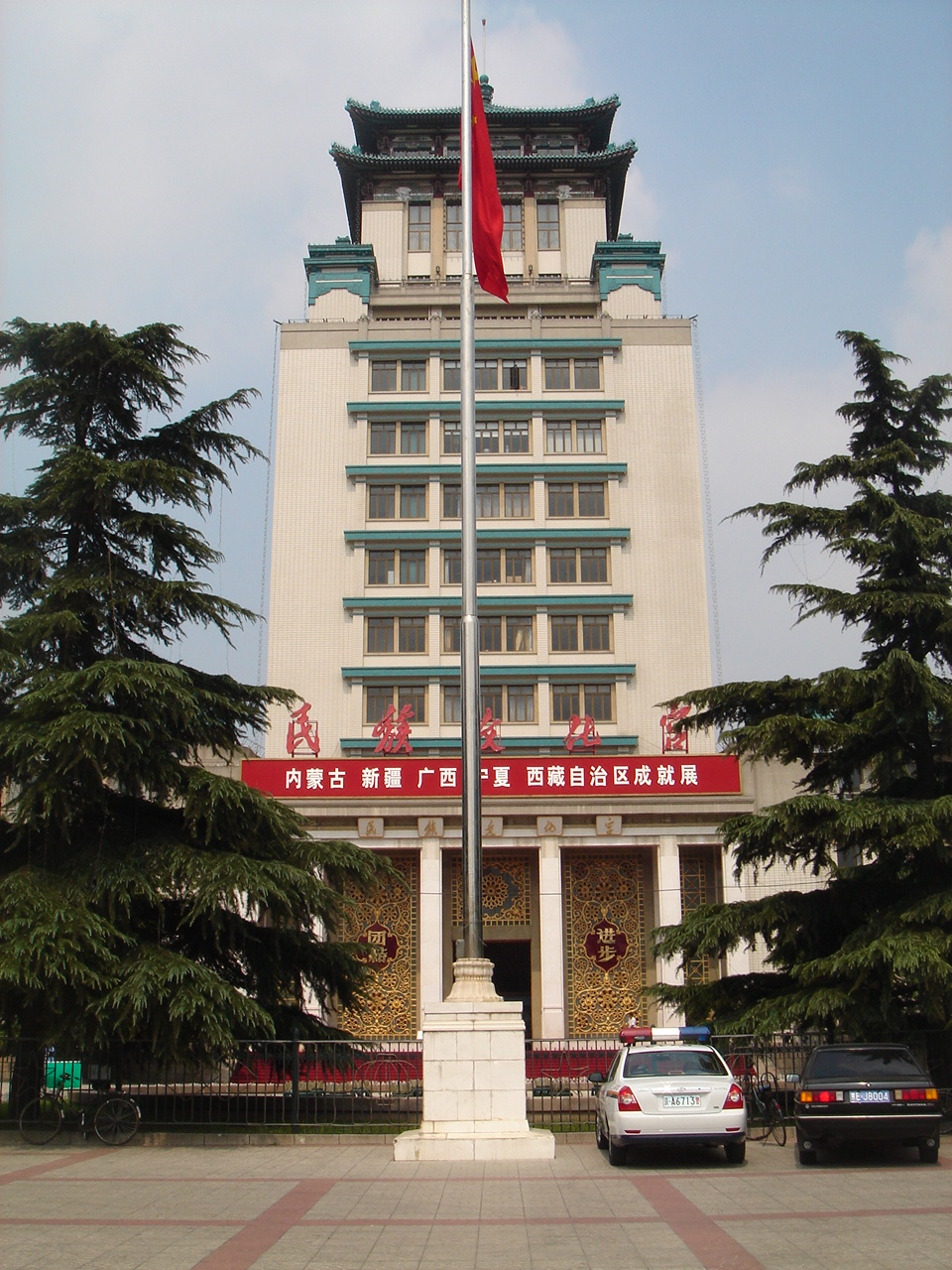
Cultural Palace of Nationalities

== The buildings ==
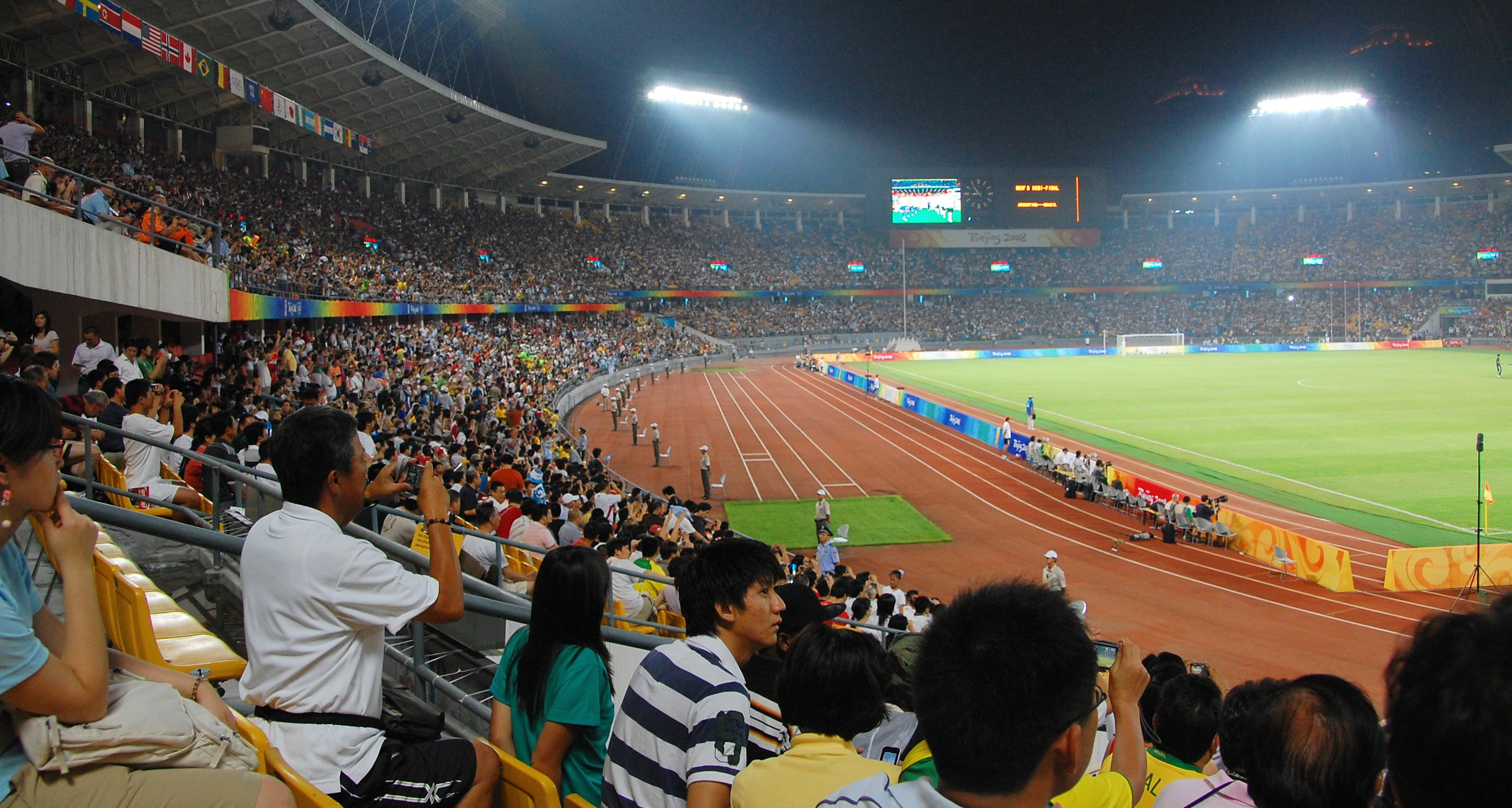
Workers' Stadium

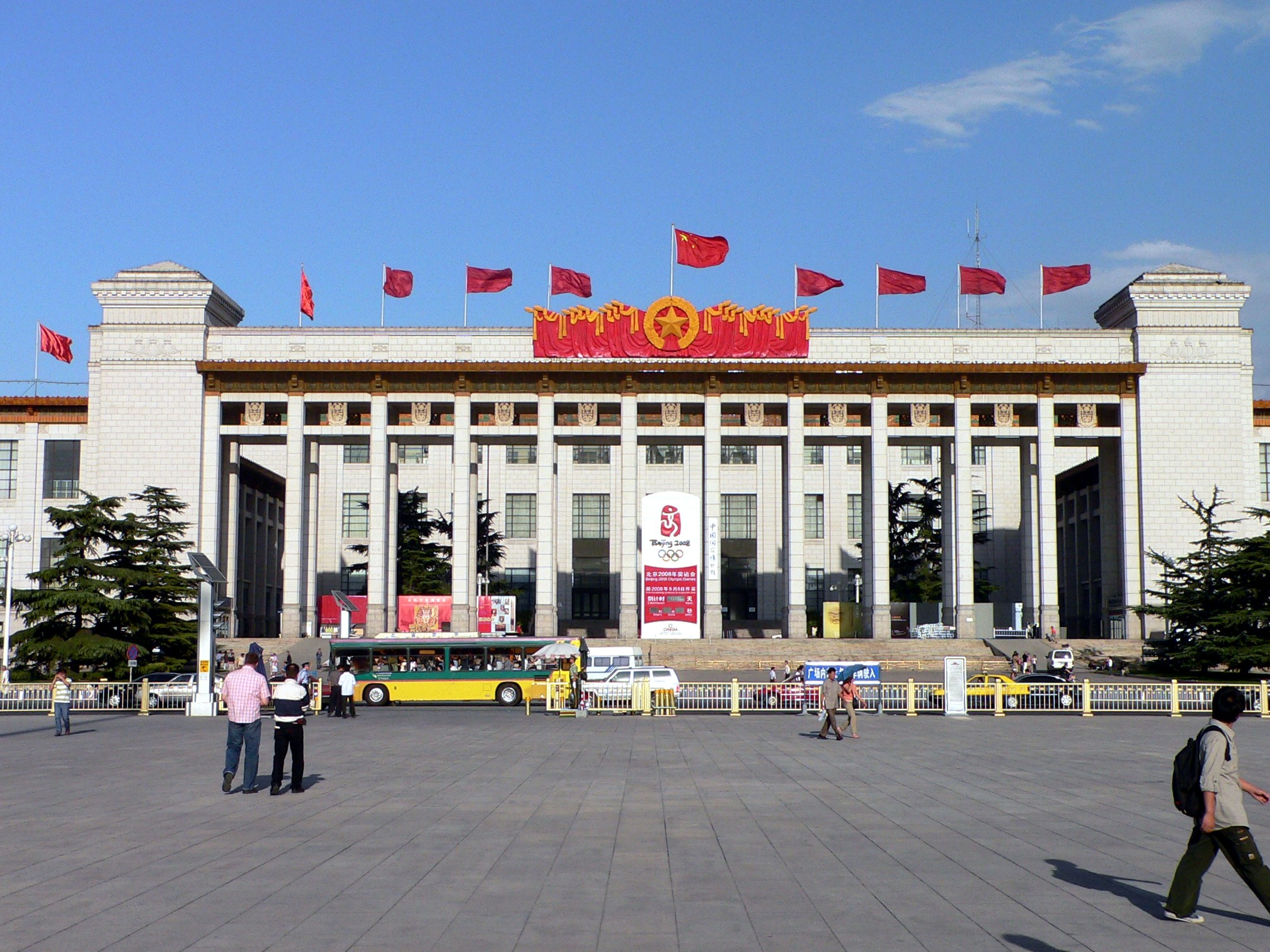
National Museum of China

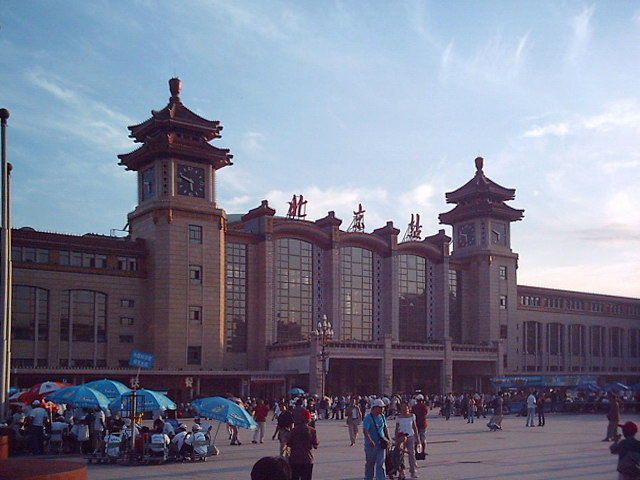
Beijing railway station

The ten buildings are:

- The Great Hall of the People – Located on the western edge of Tiananmen Square, the Great Hall of the People houses China's top legislative body, the National People's Congress, and is also used for other ceremonial activities.
- The National Museum of China – Originally known as the China Revolutionary History Museum, this building is located on the eastern edge of Tiananmen Square.
- The Cultural Palace of Nationalities – Located on the north side of West Chang'an Avenue, the Nationalities Cultural Palace is a medium rise building incorporating traditional Chinese design elements. It has won a number of awards as an example of modern Chinese-style design.
- The Beijing railway station – Designed by architects Yang Tingbao and Chen Deng'ao, Beijing railway station was the largest modern passenger rail terminal in China at the time of construction. Since its construction, it has served as the terminal of a number of domestic and international services, including services to Moscow, Ulaanbaatar and Pyongyang. It replaced the old Beijing railway station at Qianmen, near Tiananmen Square, which had been built in 1901.
- The Workers' Stadium – The multi-purpose stadium was last renovated in 2004 and now has a capacity of 66,161. It hosted the first National Games of the People's Republic of China. It was demolished in 2020 and rebuilt as a football-specific stadium in 2022.
- The National Agriculture Exhibition Hall – Premier Zhou Enlai oversaw the planning of this building. It was first used in 1959 to house the Tenth Anniversary National Agricultural Achievements Exhibition.
- The Diaoyutai State Guesthouse – The hotel and guesthouse complex is built on the site of an 800-year-old garden dating back to the Jin Dynasty. The building incorporates design elements of traditional Chinese garden architecture. Formerly reserved for visiting dignitaries and Chinese Communist Party officials (most famously Jiang Qing, Madame Mao), the guesthouse is now open to the public.
- The Minzu Hotel – The Minzu Hotel is located on West Chang'an Avenue. It has hosted numerous foreign delegations, and is often used for press conferences.
- The Overseas Chinese Hotel – The original Overseas Chinese Hotel was demolished in the 1990s. A new building on the same site is now part of the Prime Hotel chain.
- The Chinese People's Revolutionary Military Museum – Located on Fuxing Road in Beijing, this is the only large, comprehensive war museum in China. Displays focus on wars of the twentieth century, especially the Chinese Civil War, but also cover other ancient and modern warfare and weapons. The main building is seven storeys high at the centre, and is topped by a central steeple. Two four-storey side wings extend on either side.

== History ==
In August 1958, the Central Committee of the Chinese Communist Party decided to construct the buildings, mandating that they must be completed before National Day 1959 in order to commemorate the first ten years of the founding of "New China". Wan Li, who was Beijing vice mayor and Secretary of the Beijing Municipal Committee of the Chinese Communist Party, conveyed this instruction to the Beijing municipal government on 5 September 1958.

On 8 September, 1,000 experts from Beijing's design institutes and construction units assembled for a mobilization conference for the project. Addressing the mobilization conference, Wan described the buildings' purpose as reflecting "the great achievements in industrial and agricultural production, as well as in many other areas, after ten years of development of the New China." Wan stated that "the architects who design these projects are not participating for their own individual fame but for the honor of the 600 million Chinese people that these buildings represent – each of us is only one of those 600 million."

Participants in the design proposal process could submit their proposals individually or in groups. At the end of the submission process for each stage of the designs, the groups would come together to discuss each other's work, with the idea that they would learn from each other and to be able to compensate for individual shortcomings. Once a consensus was reached, designers would separate again for work on their proposals at the next stage. This was described as a process of "centralization" or "integrating all the different parties' strengths."

Design proceeded quicker for the seven buildings not on Tiananmen Square, and slower for the three buildings on the square, which were considered the most prestigious. To encourage innovation on these projects, Zhou Enlai encouraged submissions from the general public and students. Ultimately, more than 400 designs, originating from both amateurs and professionals, were submitted for the Ten Great Buildings.

As a result of financial constraints, in a February 1959 meeting Zhou held at Zhongnanhai, the scope of the Ten Great Buildings was modified, with some buildings previously envisioned now reduced in scale, combined, or replaced by smaller structures.

The Ten Great Buildings transformed Beijing. These monumental new buildings, constructed on a grand scale and providing modern facilities and services, helped to establish and celebrate an image of Mao Zedong's "New China". They redefined Beijing as modern and up-to-date, a part of the international socialist vision of the future, and yet still distinctively Chinese; perhaps most important, as a city comparable to other globally important "superpower" capitals such as London, Washington, D.C., and Moscow.

More recently, lists have been compiled promoting the ten great buildings of Beijing constructed during the 1980s, 1990s, and 2000s (to date); although the original 1959 list is still considered pre-eminent and definitive of the concept.

== Art program ==
The art program to coincide with the construction of the Ten Great Buildings was vast in its scope—including some 345 paintings, murals, and sculptures to decorate the new buildings. Many were done in the modes of traditional Chinese painting, and others were in the socialist realist style. The Great Hall of the People received much of the commission's attention but the campaign was not limited to this building. One aspect of the decoration in the Great Hall was the correlation of rooms for representatives from each province with regional art by artists from these respective provinces. The artistic centerpiece of this building was a large painting by Fu Baoshi and Guan Shanyue for the main staircase. Entitled This Land So Rich in Beauty, it is one of the largest paintings on paper in China, with dimensions of 5.5 by 9 meters. The painting was based on the poem Ode to Snow by Mao Zedong, and includes a transcription of Mao's calligraphy of the title.

== Architecture ==
The buildings were designed by members of the Beijing Institute of Architectural Design, working with the Beijing Planning Bureau and the Ministry of Construction. The architects used an austere combination of three basic styles: modernism in the international style, Socialist realism as expressed in Stalinist architecture, and a form of historicism based on traditional Chinese architecture.

Chinese architecture at the time was shaped by review of its own historical models mixed with external influences. Debate was vigorous in publications such as the Architectural Journal prior to the constructions, and history, modernity and influence were being conceptualized and reconsidered. A criticism of this initiative is that while creating facilities for political, and cultural institutions, these public projects failed to provide for a needed increase in housing, however, a housing surge would occur in the country later in the century. Modern architecture brought to China, as it had to the west, a new economic and rational manner of building, and the modernist buildings of the group were the least decorated by the public art campaign. Examples of this are the Workers' Stadium, the Minzu Hotel, and the Overseas Chinese Hotel. The modernist tenets of function and structure were realized in these buildings, yet these were attributed both to western capitalist influences and the Soviet notion of the proletariat. The Soviet architecture inspired examples of the Ten Buildings are the Great Hall of the People, the National Museum of China, and the Chinese People's Revolutionary Military Museum. The Great Hall of the People and the National Museum of China across from it on the square continue the numerology of tens—each having ten freestanding columns in their facades. The architectural aspects of the traditionally inspired buildings included large and heavy roofs laden with ceramic tiles. These were often stacked in multiple layers recalling the towering form of the pagoda. Another feature is upturned corners and curved ridges on hipped edges. Beneath these thick composite toppings are layers of beams, and brackets known as dougong. Examples of this type of architecture among the Ten Great Constructions are the Beijing railway station, the Nationalities Cultural Palace, and the National Agriculture Exhibition Hall.

== See also ==
- Urban Planning Society of China
- Chinese architecture
- Urban Planning in China
- Grands Projets of François Mitterrand
