= Ford C11ADF =

Ford C11/C11ADF

Overview
- Manufacturer: Ford Canada
- Production: 1941 - 1947

Body and chassis
- Body style: Station wagon van convertible (staff car)

Powertrain
- Engine: 239 cubic inch V8
- Transmission: 3-speed gearbox

Dimensions
- Wheelbase: 114 in (2,900 mm)
- Length: 195 in (5,000 mm)
- Width: 79 in (2,000 mm)
- Height: 75 in (1,900 mm)
- Curb weight: 4,230 lb (1,920 kg)

Chronology
- Predecessor: 1937 Ford
- Successor: Ford Transit 4x4

The Ford Fordor, known officially as the Ford C11ADF, Station Wagon/Heavy Utility, 4x2, was a militarized station wagon used in the North African Campaign of World War II. They often had roof hatches and a few roofless versions were also built, some being equipped with features similar to a convertible. These saw use as cargo vans, military transporters and staff cars (depending on the variation).

The C11 was based on the bodyshell of the contemporary American 1940s Ford station wagon but was based on a different heavier chassis designed for off-road use and tougher conditions. These vehicles were produced by Ford of Canada and were also built from knock-down kits in the United Kingdom (Dagenham) and Australia. It used a version of the Ford V8 engine which was also used in the British Universal Carrier and the Fordson WOT truck, allowing for much parts commonality and interchangeability between the Commonwealth allies, something that was seen as very practical advantage at the time.

The C11 can be considered one of the "precursors" to the modern Crossover SUV as it combined the mechanics and styling of a passenger car with off-road capabilities. Production of the C11 stopped in 1945 when the war ended but in the United Kingdom it continued to be produced in limited numbers for the civilian market in a somewhat modified and modernized version until 1947. This (alongside the somewhat smaller post-war Pilot) was the last large American-derived car produced by Ford in Britain as the market later focused on much smaller European-designed cars. Consequently, Ford would not market another off-road oriented van in European markets until nearly 40 years later with the 4x4 variation of its popular Transit range.
