= Giada (brand) =

Italian fashion brand

- Company type: Private
- Industry: Fashion
- Founded: 2001
- Founder: Rosanna Daolio
- Headquarters: Milan, Italy
- Products: Women's ready-to-wear, accessories
- Website: www.giada.com

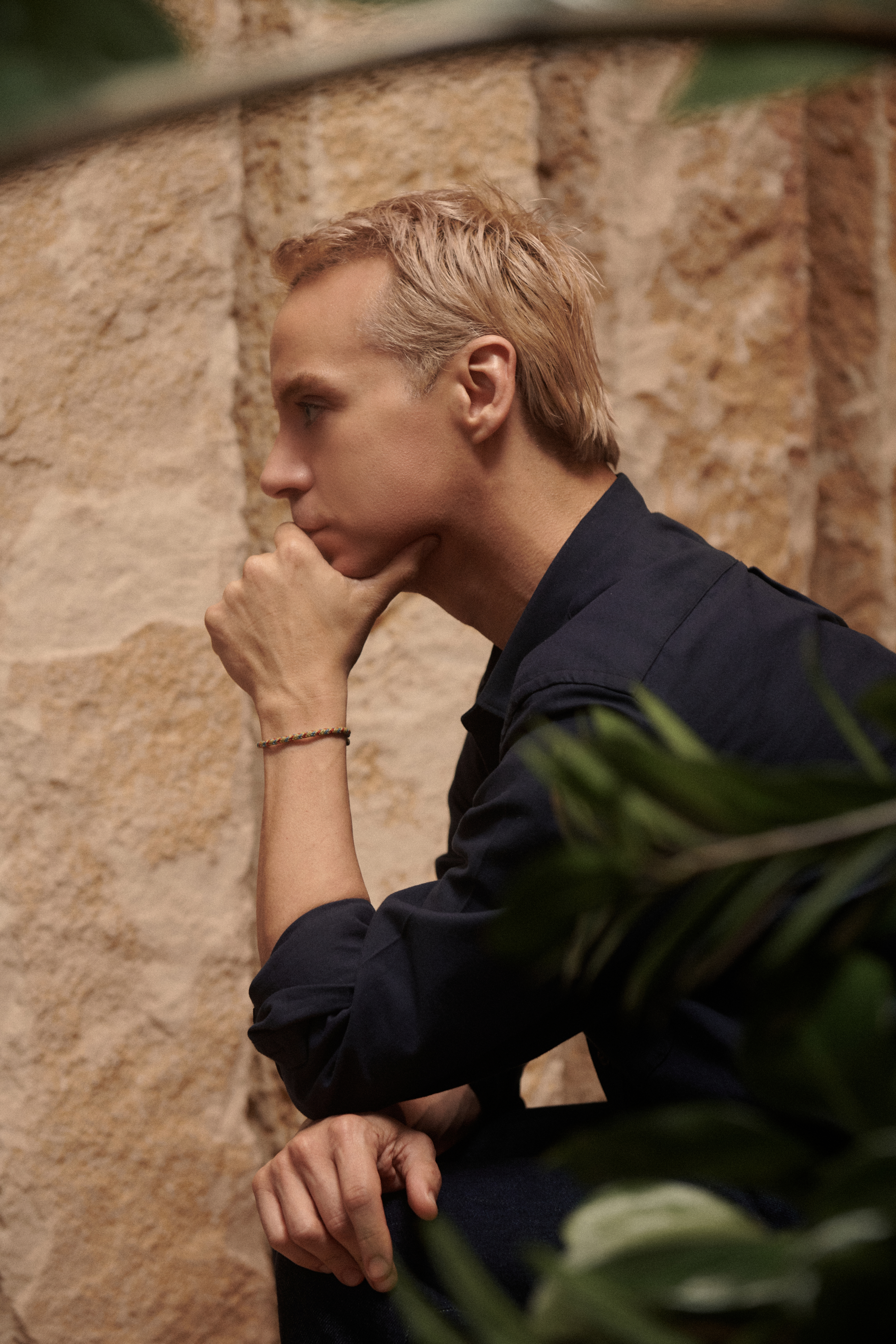
Creative director Gabriele Colangelo

Giada (stylised as GIADA) is an Italian fashion brand. It was founded in 2001 in Milan by Rosanna Daolio and bought by the Chinese company Redstone Haute Couture in 2011.

In 2013, Giada opened its first store in Via Monte Napoleone in Milan, the interior designed by Claudio Silvestrin.

In 2014, Rosanna Daolio, the founder of Giada, created the sketch of Andi coat in Giada's studio at Via Sant'Andrea 23, Milan. The Andi coat is Giada's representative product for simplicity and elegance.

In 2015, Gabriele Colangelo became the creative director of the brand.

Giada launched its womenswear collection in 2016 at Pinacoteca di Brera in Milan and continues to show its collections during Milan Fashion Week.

In 2019 it opened its first store in the United States in Boston, Massachusetts, and debuted at Milan Design Week.

In 2021, Giada opened its first Italian fine-dining restaurant Giada Garden in Beijing, and has been awarded Michelin one-star in 2023.

== Events ==
Giada Academy, a project born in January 2022 in Beijing and now in its second edition hosted in Milan at Palazzo Brera, also home to an art gallery and library, the latter already home to Giada's fashion shows in recent seasons.

Giada also created a series of events with La Lettura under the Giada Academy, dedicated to the great themes of culture, art, literature, design and journalism, hosted in Giada House in Via Montenapoleone 15, Milan.
