= San Giacomo in Paludo =

Island in Venice, Italy

Coordinates: 45°28′10″N 12°22′46″E

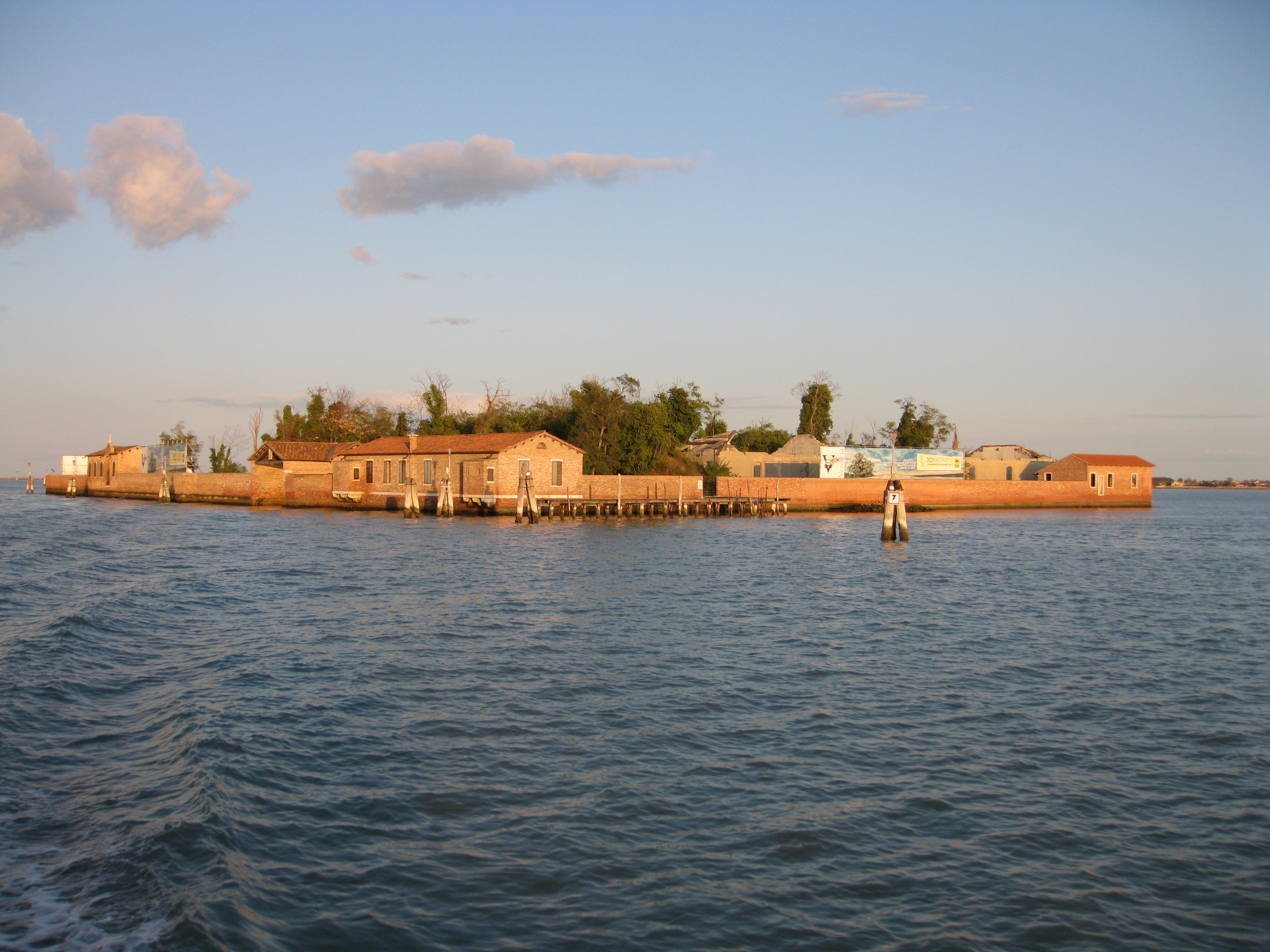

San Giacomo in Paludo is located in the north Venice Lagoon between Murano and Madonna del Monte, this island was donated by Doge Orso Badoer II in 1046 to Giovanni Trono of Mazzorbo for the construction of a monastery dedicated to St James. It was used as one of several hospices in the lagoon for pilgrims heading to the Holy Lands. It passed through several different monastic orders, and was briefly used as an island of quarantine in 1456. It was eventually given over to the Franciscans in the 16th century, who stayed until they were suppressed in 1769.

The Austrians converted it to military use, a use continued by the Italians until 1961. Today it's abandoned, except for archaeologists who have excavated a number of medieval structures.
