= Fodor =

The surname Fodor may refer to the following notable people:

- Bence Fodor (born 2002), Hungarian canoeist
- Benjamin Fodor alias Phoenix Jones (born 1988), American real-life superhero
- Carel Anton Fodor (1768–1846), Dutch conductor and composer
- Carl Fodor (born 1963), American football player
- Caros Fodor (born 1984), American mixed martial artist
- Eugene Fodor (writer) (1905–1991), American writer of travel literature, founder of Fodor's travel guides
- Eugene Fodor (violinist) (1950–2011), American violin virtuoso
- Florin Fodor (born 1974), Romanian who has repeatedly attempted to enter Canada illegally
- Gábor Fodor (chemist) (1915–2000), chemist
- Gábor Fodor (politician) (born 1962), liberal politician
- Géza Fodor (philosopher) (1943–2008), art critic, dramaturge
- Géza Fodor (mathematician) (1927–1977), mathematician, the namesake of Fodor's lemma
- István Fodor (born 1945), Hungarian former politician, former Speaker of the National Assembly of Hungary
- Janet Dean Fodor (1942–2023), American psycholinguist
- Jerry Fodor (1935–2017), American author and philosopher
- Josef von Fodor (1843–1901), Hungarian professor of hygiene
- Lajos Fodor (born 1947), Hungarian colonel general and diplomat, former Chief of the General Staff of the Armed Forces of the Republic of Hungary
- Marcel Fodor (1890–1977), Hungarian-American foreign correspondent, journalist, and author
- Răzvan Fodor (born 1975), Romanian singer

== See also ==
- Fodor's, a travel and tourism publisher
