= Claudio Silvestrin =

Italian architect and designer

Claudio Silvestrin (b. Zurich, 5 September 1954) is an Italian architect and designer, and a British citizen.

He studied under AG Fronzoni in Milan and at the Architectural Association School of Architecture in London. From 1986 to 1988, Silvestrin worked in partnership with John Pawson at their London studio Pawson Silvestrin Architects. In 1989 he established Claudio Silvestrin Architects, with offices in London and, from 2006, in Milan.

Considered a master of contemporary minimalism, Silvestrin is admired by international architects and designers, such as Giorgio Armani, Terence Conran and Kanye West. He is known for serene spaces and simple, essential forms of his architecture and interior design.

== Selected works ==
- Villa Neuendorf, Mallorca, Spain (1989)
- Giorgio Armani stores (1999–2007)
- Museum of Contemporary Art - Fondazione Sandretto Re Rebaudengo, Turin, Italy (2002)
- Donnelly gallery - residence, Irish Coast (2002)
- GIADA Stores (2013-2020)
- Victoria Miro Private Collection Space, London, UK (2006)
- Kanye West's loft, New York (2007)
- Rocca Sinibalda Castle, Rieti, Italy (2014)
- Fashion Mall Torino Outlet Village, Settimo Torinese, Italy (2017)

== Awards ==
- 2003 Gold Medal award for Italian Architecture at the Triennale in Milan
- 2005 International Award Architecture in Stone for Giorgio Armani Worldwide Image
- 2005 Travel + Leisure Magazine Design Awards for Princi Bakery XXV Aprile, Milan
- 2005 Wallpaper (magazine) Design Awards for Terra Kitchen for Minotti Cucine
- 2008 Best Communicator Award for La Cava, a stone installation for Il Casone at Marmomacc, Verona
- 2008 Archip, Domus Russia Magazine Award for P Penthouse, Montecarlo
- 2009 CNBC Asia-Pacific Property Awards, Best Development for Sandy Island Housing Development, Sentosa, Singapore
- 2009 Chicago Athenaeum International Architectural Award for Victoria Miro Private Collection Space, London
- 2011 South East Asia Property Awards, Best Architectural Design for Sandy Island Housing Development, Sentosa, Singapore
- 2013 FIABCI Prix d’Excellence Awards for Sandy Island Housing Development, Sentosa, Singapore
- 2014 Chicago Athenaeum International Architectural Award for Rocca Sinibalda Castle, Italy
- 2016 LEAF Award (Leading European Architecture Forum) for Cannon Lane House, London

== Books ==
- Franco Bertoni, Claudio Silvestrin, Birkhäuser 1999
- Sacred Spirit in Interni magazine (Italy) n. 567, Dic. 2006
- Claudio Silvestrin progetti e scritti, Eye Claudio, Viabizzuno edizioni 2008
- Franco Bertoni, Claudio Silvestrin - The non-materiality of the material, Umberto Allemandi 2011
- C. Silvestrin - Timeless Italian Style: Architecture, design, philosophy, Design Media Publishing 2017
