= Western opera in Chinese =

Chinese contemporary classical opera (Chinese: 当今古典歌剧; pinyin: dāngjīn gǔdiǎn gējù; lit. 'contemporary classical singing drama') is a Chinese-language musical art form drawing on western opera traditions - distinct from modern developments of traditional Chinese opera.

One of the first western-style operas was The White Haired Girl (1940). Chinese-language western-style opera is to be distinguished the Revolutionary operas of the Cultural Revolution such as Taking Tiger Mountain by Strategy which were mainly an adaption of Peking opera with socialist text and subjects, with some influence from Soviet musical theatre. The 1950s-70s saw several patriotic socialist operas, such as Red Guards on Honghu Lake (1956). Modern operas with a continuation of "realist" socialist elements include A Village Teacher (2009).

China has several separate geju companies under the Ministry of Culture, parallel with the traditional Chinese opera companies. The most prestigious are the Beijing-based central geju-yuan China National Opera House troupe (CNOH), and the Shanghai-based Shanghai Opera House company. In each case the term "Opera House," geju-yuan, refers to the institute or company, not to a fixed building or theatre. The street addresses of both companies are merely administrative offices and rehearsal rooms. Other notable geju companies around China include the Liaoning geju yuan, based in Shenyang and others. The status of geju has been boosted by availability of new world-class venues such as the China's National Centre for the Performing Arts in Beijing ("The Big Egg" on Tiananmen Square East) and the new Shanghai Grand Theatre. Since its opening in 2009 CHNCPA has staged operas such as Xi Shi and A Village Teacher in 2009, The Chinese Orphan in 2011, and the folk-opera The Ballad of Canal in 2012. The Shanghai Grand Theatre has similarly staged Chinese-language geju of the Shanghai Opera House company along with Italian, French and German-language operas.

== List of works ==
The following includes some operas which are considered closer to the Chinese opera traditional model than geju or western opera.

=== Experimental period, 1945-1956 ===
- 1945 - Ma Ke et al. White-Haired Girl at Yan'an Lu Xun Art Academy

After founding of the PRC, 1949:

- 1954 - Chen Zi, Mao Yuan and Ge Guangrui: Liu Hulan 《刘胡兰》 Central Experimental Xin-geju Academy, Beijing
- - Ma Ke: Xiao'erhei jiehun
- 1955 - Luo Zongxian: Caoyuan zhi ge 《草原之歌》 "Song of the Prairies"

=== Second wave, 1956-1966 ===
A second wave followed National Music Week, 1956, which lasted till the last geju Ayiguli in 1966 on the eve of the Cultural Revolution.

- 1956 - Chen Zi and Liang Kexiang: Spring Blossoms Yingchunhua kaile (libretto by Lu Cang, Wang Lie)
- 1956 - Du Yu: Mongolian themed folk opera The Gada plum blossoms based on the Mongolian folk song Gada meilin
- 1958 - Zhang Rui: Rosy Clouds Hong xia (libretto by Shi Han)
- 1958 - Shu Tiemin and Ceng Fangke: The Red-cloud Cliff Hongyun ya (libretto by Liang Shangquan, Lu Peng, Jiang Shengtao, Su Mei)
- 1958 - Zhang Dinghe: The Tale of Huai Yin Huai Yin ji (libretto by Lu Su, Huang Cengjiu, Guan Taiping)
- 1959 - Zhang Jing'an: Honghu Chiweidui "Red Guards of Lake Hong Hu", Wuhan
- 1959 - Shi Lemeng: Two Women of the Red Army Liangge nv hongjun (libretto by Chen Qitong)
- 1959 - Zhuang Ying and Lu Ming: Keshan hong ri "Red Sun over Mount Ke" PLA Opera Troupe
- 1960 - Wang Xiren and Hu Shiping: Hong Shanhu "Red Coral" libretto by Zhao Zhong, PLA Opera Troupe - also filmed by Wang Shaoyan director of the film Red Coral (1961)
- 1960 - Chen Zi and Du Yu: Dou E Yuan based on the play The Grievances of Dou E, also known as "Snow in Summer"
- 1960 - Zhang Dinghe and Du Yu: Doushi Ting "The Poem Contest Pavilion"
- 1961 - Chen Zi and Du Yu: Chun Lei "Spring Thunder"
- 1962 - Zheng Lücheng: Longing for Husband Cloud (libretto by Xu Jiarui)
- 1962 - Collective work: Liu Sanjie, filmed as "Third Sister Liu" the same year.
- 1964 - Ge Guangrui: Zi you houlai ren "We have our own successors"
- 1964 - Zhang Yu: Red Plum-Blossom Ridge Hongmei Ling, film version 1965
- 1964 - Chen Zi: Chunfeng yangliu "Willows in the spring breeze"
- 1964 - Yang Ming and Jiang Chunyang: Jiang Jie "Sister Jiang" - libretto by Yan Su
- 1965 - Du Yu: Ren huan ma jiao "A busy country scene"
- 1966 - Shi Fu and Wusi Manjiang: Ayiguli
- 1966 - Mao Yuan and Ma Fei: Nanhai Changcheng "The Great Wall of the South Seas"

=== 1977 onward ===
- Flower-Guardian (1979)
- Peng Dehuai Sits on the Sedan Chair (1980)
- 1980 - Wang Shiguang and Cai Kexiang: Di yibai ge xinniang "The Hundredth Bride"
- 1981 - Shi Guangnan: Shangshi "Mourning" - a folk opera based on a story by Lu Xun
- The Youth of Today (1982)
- The Wedding Sonata (1983)
- The Homeland (1984)
- 1983 - Wang Zujie and Zhang Zhuoya: Fangcaoxin "Fangfang, heart of grass", first performance Nanjing, Frontline Song and Dance Troupe.
- 1987 - Jin Xiang: 原野 The Savage Land based on the play by Cao Yu.
- 1995 - Xu Zhanhai (徐占海 b.1945): Cangyuan "broad grasslands" Liaoning Geju Yuan, Shenyang production
- 2006 - Mo Fan: 雷雨 Thunderstorm (opera) - based on Cao Yu's play Thunderstorm
- 2008 - Xiao Bai: Farewell My Concubine
- 2009 - Lei Lei: 《西施》Xi Shi to a libretto by Zou Jingzhi
- 2009 - Hao Weiya: 《山村女教师》A Village Teacher
- 2011 - Lei Lei:《赵氏孤儿》The Chinese Orphan
- 2012 - Yin Qing: 《运河谣》Yunheyao "Ballad of Canal"
- 2012 - Xu Zhanhai and others, Diaoyucheng - based on the story of Chongqing's Diaoyu Fortress
- 2014 - Guo Wenjing :《骆驼祥子》Rickshaw Boy
- 2014 - Lei Lei: 《冰山上的来客》Visitors on the Icy Mountain after the 1963 film
- 2015 - Jin Xiang: 《日出》Sunrise after the 1936 play by Cao Yu
- 2017 - Zhang Qianyi: Lan Huahua
- 2017 - Lei Lei: Jinsha River (opera)
- 2022 - Minning Town
- 2022 - Gustav Mak: 《孔子傳》The Legend of Confucius

== Taiwan ==
Tenor William Wu (吴文修) directed 《万里长城》The Great Wall with music by Yang Yao-chang (楊耀章) and a libretto by Pi Kuo (碧果). Premiered by the Taiwan Metropolitan Opera (首都歌劇團) 1993, cross-straits production 1995.
