= Dilber Yunus =

Chinese singer

Dilber Yunus (Uyghur: دىلبەر يۇنۇس; Chinese: 迪里拜尔·尤努斯, Pinyin: Dílǐbàiěr Yóunǔsī; born October 2, 1958) is a Uyghur lyric soprano with coloratura technique. She has been called the "Philomela of China," in reference to the Athenian King Pandion I's daughter, who, according to legend, turned into a nightingale. She is a citizen of Finland.

== Life ==
Dilber was born in Kashgar, Xinjiang Uyghur Autonomous Region, China. She was admitted in 1976 to the Xinjiang Song and Dance Troupe. Four years later, she enrolled in the Department of Vocal Music and Opera at Beijing's Central Music Conservatory and while still a student there, won an award in the Finland International Opera Competition. In 1987, Dilber finished her master's degree at the Conservatory and promptly joined the roster of the Finnish National Opera company, later adding a position with Sweden's Malmo Opera. She twice won the Birgit Nilsson Stipend, in 1997 and 1998. Dilber Yunus has served as a distinguished professor in the China Conservatory of Music between 2008 and 2018. In September 2018, she joined the Central Conservatory of Music and serves as a professor in the department of vocal arts and opera performance.

Dilber is considered to rank among the more accomplished singers of her generation in her voice category, with a clarion and powerful top. She has been praised for restraint in her use of ornamentation and for vocal balance. Among her recordings is an acclaimed La sonnambula by Bellini on which she sings Amina, recorded live in Amsterdam in 1992, for the Naxos label.

Dilber gave hundreds of solo concerts and recitals around the world and performed the following roles in staged productions of operas:

- The Queen of the Night in Mozart's Die Zauberflöte
- Rosina in Rossini’s Il barbiere di Siviglia
- Amina in Bellini’s La sonnambula
- Adina in Donizetti’s L'elisir d'amore
- Marie in Donizetti’s La fille du régiment
- Lucia in Donizetti’s Lucia di Lammermoor
- Gilda in Verdi’s Rigoletto
- Nanetta in Verdi’s Falstaff
- Oscar in Verdi’s Un ballo in maschera
- Olympia in Offenbach’s Les contes d'Hoffmann
- Sophie in Massenet’s Werther
- a Flowermaiden in Wagner’s Parsifal
- the title role in Stravinsky’s Le rossignol
- Zerbinetta in Strauss’s Ariadne auf Naxos
- Lauretta in Puccini’s Gianni Schicchi
- Yang Caihong in Hao Weiya's A Village Teacher
- Grandam in Lei Lei's Visitors on the Snow Mountain

== See also ==
- Ablajan Awut Ayup
- Arken Abdulla
