= China National Opera =

Chinese national opera company

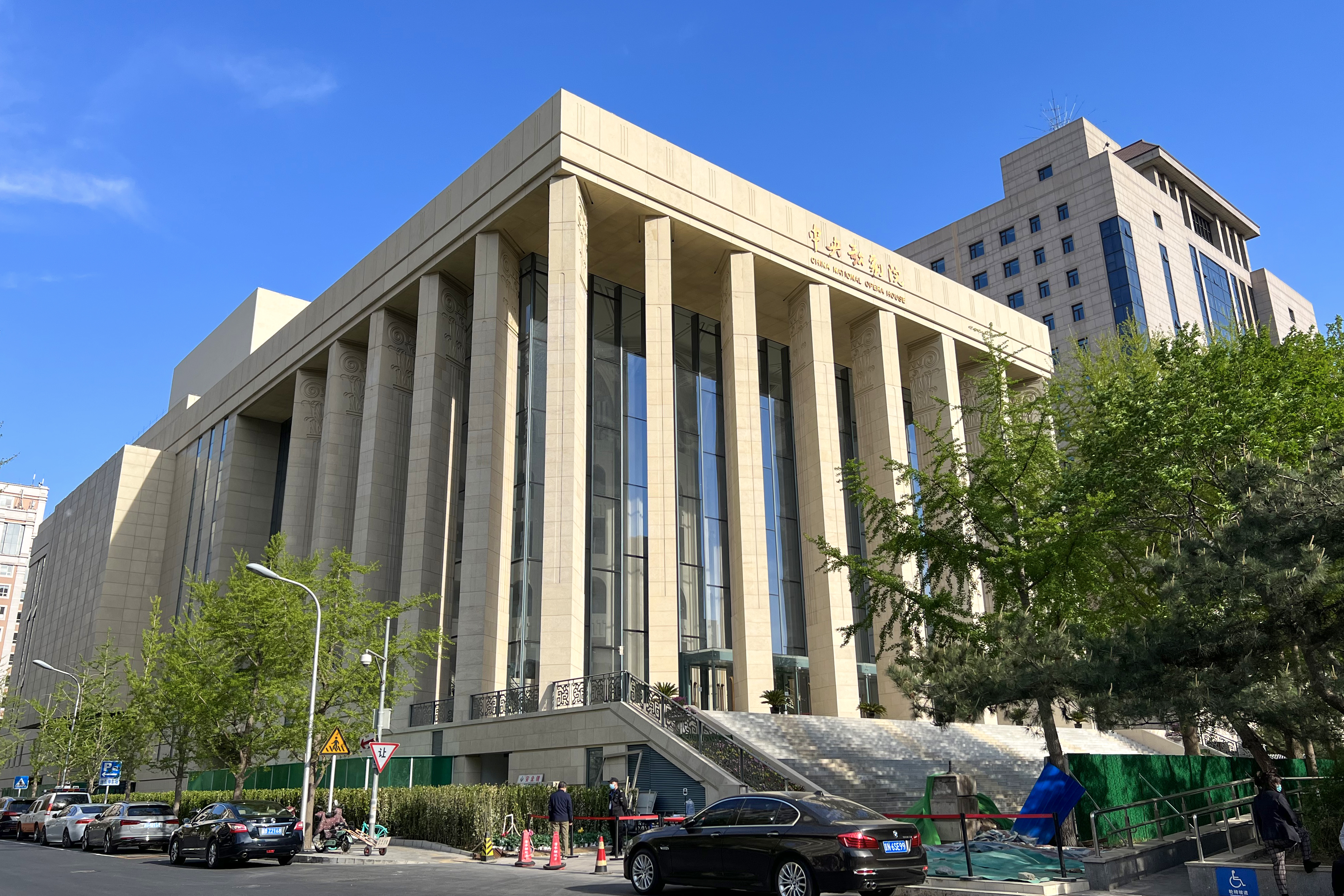
China National Opera House

The China National Opera House (CNOH) or China Central Opera (中央歌剧院) is a State-run opera company based in Beijing, China, and under the Chinese Ministry of Culture. CNOH consists of an opera troupe, a choir, a symphony orchestra and a stagecraft, costume and scenery departments. It is affiliated, through common direction under the Ministry of Culture and Tourism, with the Shanghai Opera House company and other geju companies around China.

== History ==
The China Central Opera was preceded in Yan'an in 1942 with the performance of the Yangge drama (秧歌剧) Brothers and Sisters Opening up the Wasteland (兄妹开荒), and the White-Haired Girl. The opera troupe relocated to Beijing in 1952 and was officially established in 1952 as the national opera company directly under the Ministry of Culture and Tourism.

=== Productions in China ===
CNOH staged La Boheme in Beijing in 1986 with Luciano Pavarotti and later Turandot in the Forbidden City. Then in June 2001 came the successful Three Tenors Forbidden City Concert. In 2009, CNOH staged Turandot with Zhang Yimou in the "Bird's Nest" Beijing National Stadium, and again in the Taichung Intercontinental Baseball Stadium in Taiwan.

=== Tours abroad ===
CNOH has toured abroad since its conception, first in socialist countries, then in the west. In 1988 CNOH was guest company at the Savonlinna Opera Festival performing Carmen, Madam Butterfly, Verdi's Requiem as well as Chinese-language opera. In 2008 CNOH toured America with 10 performances of the original creation Farewell My Concubine (modern opera). In the same year CNOH performed Puccini's Turandot in Cairo Opera House.

On 24 November 1956, they were on return to China after an opera tour in Latin America/West-Europe. During the return flight, ten Chinese members were among those dead in the 1956 Eglisau Ilyushin Il-12 plane crash.

== Building ==
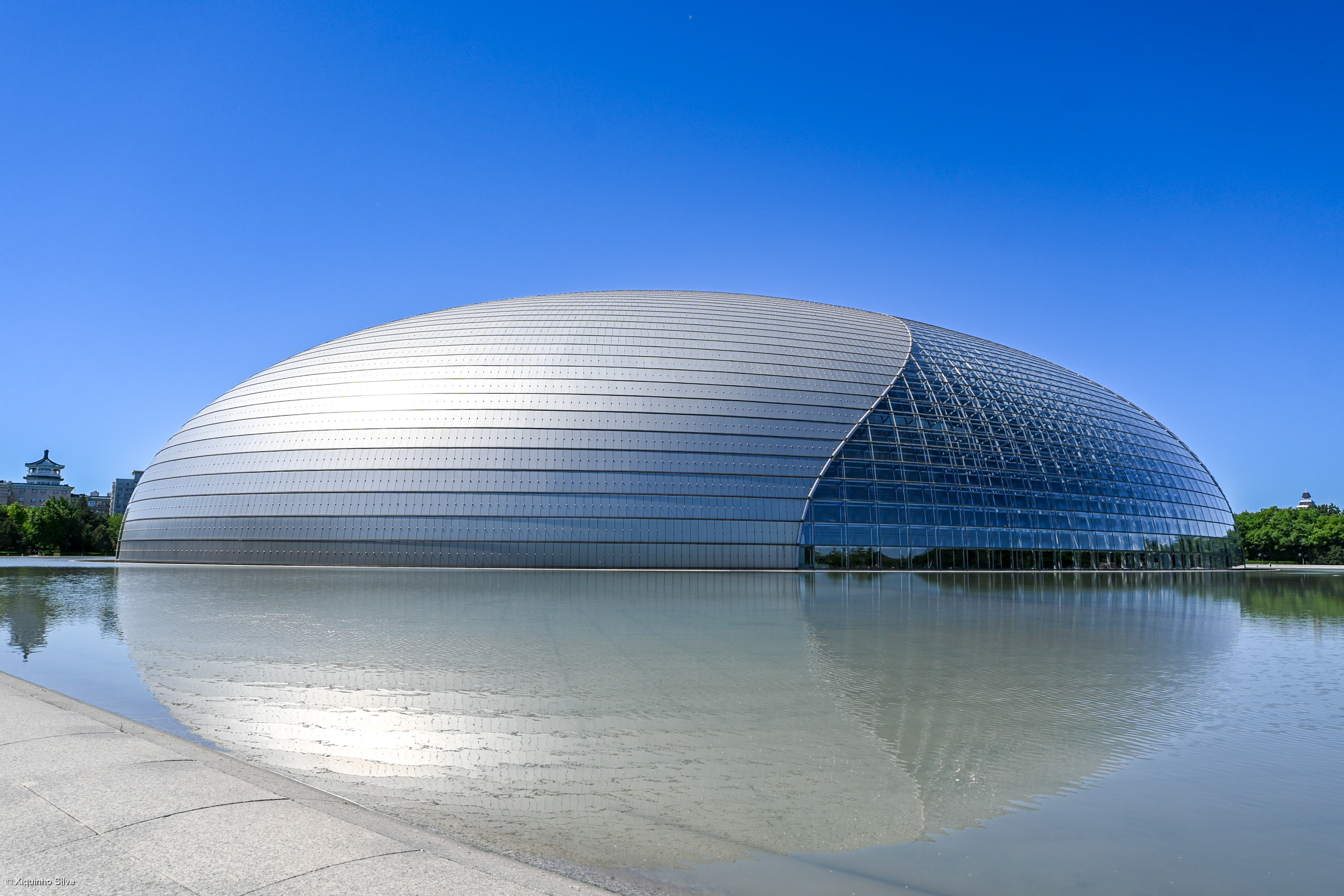
National Centre for the Performing Arts

The administrative offices, practice rooms and a rehearsal theatre, often referred to as the "Central National Opera House," are located at Chaoyangmen Outer Street Dongzhong-jie 115, south-east of Dongsi Shitiao Station in West Beijing, however since the opening of the National Centre for the Performing Arts at Tiananmen Square East, performances at the permanent theatre of the Opera company are rare. The company instead performs in larger theatres around China, including the Shanghai Oriental Art Centre, supplies opera singers to television stations and for concert performances, and tours abroad. On April 20, 2022, a press conference was held at the newly built Opera House in Beijing. The total construction area of the theater is 41,000 sqm. On May 1, 2022, the National Opera House officially opened to the public. On the evening of July 6, 2022, the opening concert of the National Opera House Theater was performed.

== Repertoire ==
The repertoire of the company includes Madame Butterfly, Eugene Onegin, Carmen, La Traviata, Gianni Schicchi, Turandot, Aida, La Boheme, Rigoletto, The Marriage of Figaro, Otello, Cavalleria Rusticana, The Barber of Seville, Les Contes d'Hoffmann, Le Roi d'Ys, as well as Chinese-language western-style operas, such as Liu Hulan, Caoyuan zhi ge, Ayiguli, The Hundredth Bride, Marco Polo, Du Shiniang, Farewell My Concubine, Countryside Girl Teacher, The Love Story of Rawap (2009) and Revolution in 1911 (2011), staged in Macau.

== People ==
Presidents of CNOH include Li Bozhao, Zhou Weizhi, Lu Su, Zhao Feng, composer Ma Ke, Li Ling, Liu Lianchi, Wang Shiguang, Chen Xieyang and Liu Xijin. Conductor Yu Feng is the current president. Notable singers of the company, past and present include Yuan Chenye, baritone.
