= China National Center for the Performing Arts Orchestra =

Chinese orchestra based in Beijing

China National Centre for the Performing Arts Orchestra (NCPA Orchestra)
- Orchestra
- Short name: NCPA Orchestra
- Founded: 30 March 2010
- Location: No.2 West Chang'an Avenue, Beijing, China
- Concert hall: National Center for the Performing Arts
- Principal conductor: Lü Jia
- Website: www.chncpa.org

The China National Center for the Performing Arts Orchestra (Chinese: 国家大剧院管弦乐团) is a Chinese orchestra based in Beijing. It is the resident orchestra of the National Center for the Performing Arts (NCPA) located in the Xicheng District of Beijing. The NCPA Orchestra and its related organization, the China NCPA Chorus (国家大剧院合唱团), serve primarily as the resident musical ensembles of the NCPA, supporting opera and ballet productions at the theater.

The China NCPA Orchestra was founded in March 2010, with full funding from the Chinese government, three months after the China NCPA Chorus was founded. About 60 musicians were selected from a global pool of candidates with an average age of 27. For the six years since its establishment, the average age of the musicians has increased from 27 to 31, and the total number of musicians has been doubled. The NCPA Orchestra undertook its first North American tour in late 2014.

Chen Zuohuang was the founding music director of the orchestra, and now holds the title of conductor laureate. Since 2012, the orchestra's chief conductor has been Lü Jia. The orchestra's current assistant conductor is Yuan Ding.

== Performances ==
In addition to performing core repertoire operas by European composers, including Turandot, Tosca, The Barber of Seville, Lohengrin, Aida, Otello, Nabucco, the NCPA Orchestra has accompanied most of its own productions of Chinese operas including The Chinese Orphan (Chinese: 赵氏孤儿), Rickshaw Boy (Chinese: 骆驼祥子) and Visitors on the Snow Mountain (Chinese: 冰山上的来客), The Long March (Chinese: 长征), A Village Teacher (Chinese: 山村女教师), The Red Guards on Honghu Lake (Chinese: 洪湖赤卫队), The Dawns Here are Quiet (Chinese: 这里的黎明静悄悄), and Xi Shi (Chinese: 西施).

Apart from performing the operatic and symphonic repertoire, the NCPA Orchestra together with the NCPA Chorus and other musical groups has been performing series of educational Weekend Matinee Concerts and salons at its home venue as well as in schools, hospitals, museums, and other communities.
