= Shanghai Opera House =

Western-style opera company of Shanghai, China

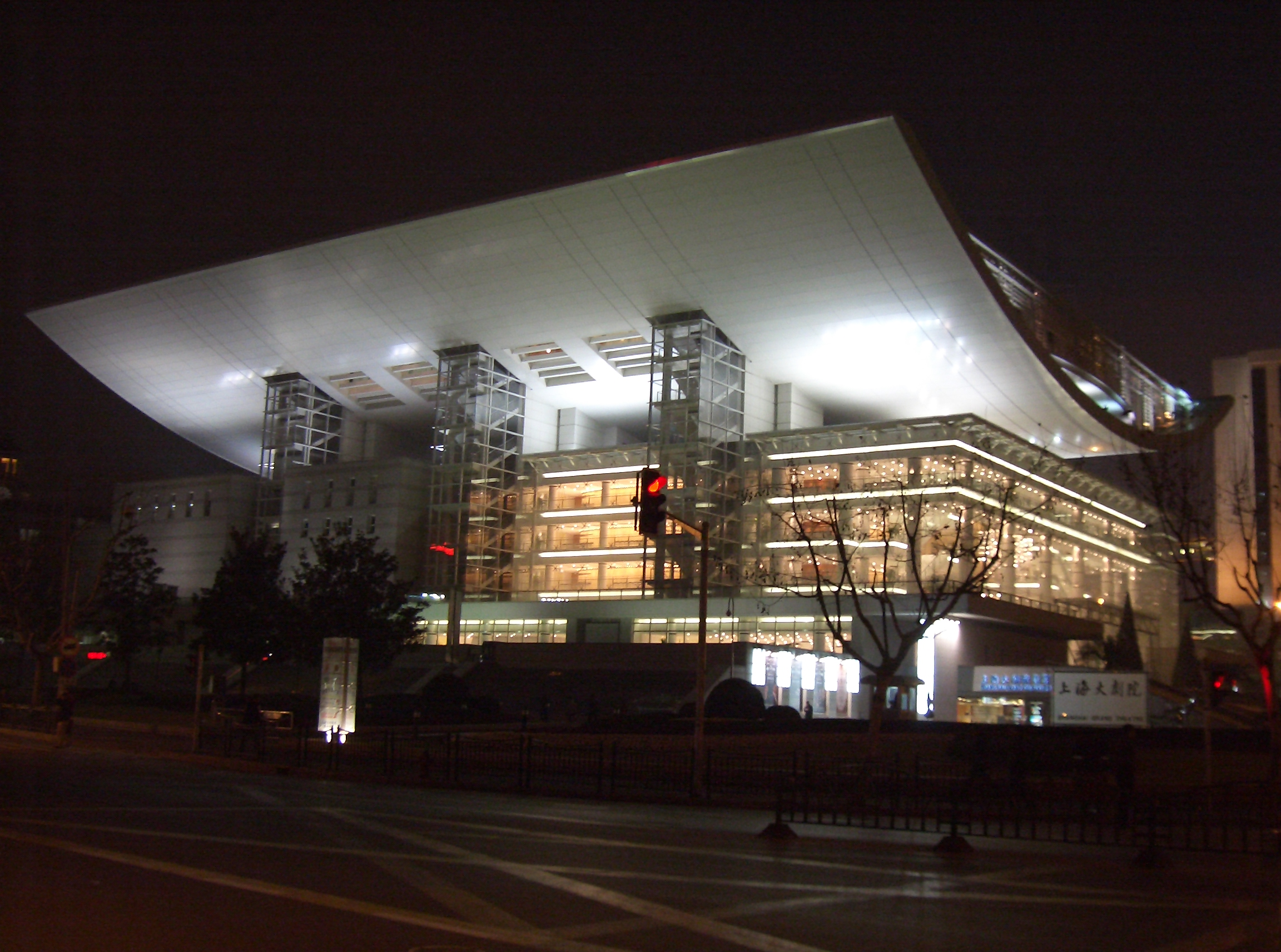
Shanghai Grand Theatre at night - the resident location of "Shanghai Opera House" and other troupes.

Shanghai Opera House (Chinese: 上海歌剧院; pinyin: Shànghǎi Gējù Yuàn; Shanghainese: Zånhae Kujihyoe) is the official government-funded western-style opera company of Shanghai, China, and the resident opera company at the new Shanghai Grand Theatre (上海大剧院 Shanghai Da Juyuan). Although the term "Opera House" is often applied to the building, both in English and Chinese texts, officially the building is not an opera house and the term "Shanghai Opera House" properly applies only to the performing company, not the building, as is also true for its senior sister company, the China National Opera House (CNOH) in Beijing. The reason for the distinction is found in that the Chinese character Yuan (院) applies primarily to a school or institute or dramatic troupe rather than the building in which a school, institute or dramatic company resides.

The offices, practice rooms and small rehearsal theatre are located at No.10 100-lòng Changshu Road, Jing'an District, Shanghai.

== Repertoire ==
The repertoire of the opera company includes various western works: Aida, L'Elisir d'Amore, Orfeo ed Euridice, Eugene Onegin (opera), Otello, Pelléas et Mélisande (opera), The Nose (opera), Die Fledermaus, Les Pêcheurs de Perles, Samson et Dalila, La Traviata, I Pagliacci, L'amour des Trois Oranges.

Its repertoire of Chinese-language western-style operas (dangdai geju) includes: White-Haired Girl, Zan Yuen ("broad grasslands"), Fangcaoxin ("Fangfang, heart of grass"), Red Guards on Honghu Lake, Sister Jiang, Leiyu (based on Cao Yu's play Thunderstorm), Shangshi ("Mourning" 1981 folk opera based on a story by Lu Xun) and The Savage Land.

== See also ==
Shanghai Opera Theater
