= Zou Jingzhi =

Chinese playwright

Zou Jingzhi (邹静之, 1952) is a Chinese playwright. He has written the librettos for two Chinese-language western-style operas by woman composer Lei Lei: Xi Shi (opera) based on the story of Xi Shi, and The Chinese Orphan (2011) based on the story The Orphan of Zhao. The premiere of both operas was at Beijing's NCPA. His novel Ninth Building was longlisted for 2023 International Booker Prize.

== Filmography ==
- Riding Alone for Thousands of Miles (2005) (screenplay)
- The 601st Phone Call (2006) (writer)
- My Kingdom (2011) (screenplay)
- The Grandmaster (2013) (screenplay)
- Coming Home (2014) (screenplay)
- Xuanzang (2015) (screenplay)
