= Liu Hulan (opera) =

1954 Chinese opera

Liu Hulan (刘胡兰) is a 1954 Chinese-language western-style opera by Chen Zi. It is based on the death of a 14-year-old communist party girl Liu Hulan, who was elevated into a revolutionary martyr. Part of the original opera was composed in 1949, only 2 years after her death, and revised into a full-scale opera in 1954. Several other composers such as Ge Guangrui also contributed to Chen's opera. A similar opera based on another revolutionary martyr is Sister Jiang.

An early piece of art depicting Liu as a heroic martyr was the spoken drama Liu Hulan. In Spring 1947, members of the Combat Dramatic Society founded by General He Long read an account of Liu's martyrdom in Jinsui Daily. A member of the organization interviewed Liu's family and local villagers and used these accounts to collectively write the spoken drama over the course of several weeks.Inspired by the success of The White-Haired Girl, in 1948 the Combat Dramatic Society adapted their spoken drama into the operatic version, Liu Hulan.

In 1950, one of Liu's executioners (Zhang Quanbao) attended a performance of the opera Liu Hulan. He broke down emotionally while seeing the audience's animosity toward the character ("Big Beard") which represented him. He was captured in 1951, put on public trial, and executed.
