= Farewell My Concubine =

Farewell My Concubine may refer to:

- The Hegemon-King Bids His Concubine Farewell, a traditional Chinese opera
- Farewell My Concubine (novel), a 1985 novel by Lilian Lee
- Farewell My Concubine (film), a 1993 Chinese film by Chen Kaige, based on the novel by Lilian Lee
- Farewell My Concubine (modern opera), a Western-style Chinese opera by Xiao Bai, which toured the United States in 2008
