= Diaoyucheng (opera) =

Diàoyúchéng (钓鱼城) is a 2012 Chinese-language western-style opera based on the story of the siege of Diaoyu Fortress during the Mongol conquest of the Song dynasty, and the resistance of the brothers Ran Jin and Ran Pu. The work was produced by staff of Chongqing Opera. Music was collectively composed by Xu Zhanhai (徐占海) Zheng Bing (郑冰) and Wang Hua (王华) to a libretto by Feng Boming (冯柏铭) and Feng Bilie (冯必烈). It will be performed at the CHNCPA in May 2013.
