= The Injustice to Dou E =

Play

Dou E Yuan
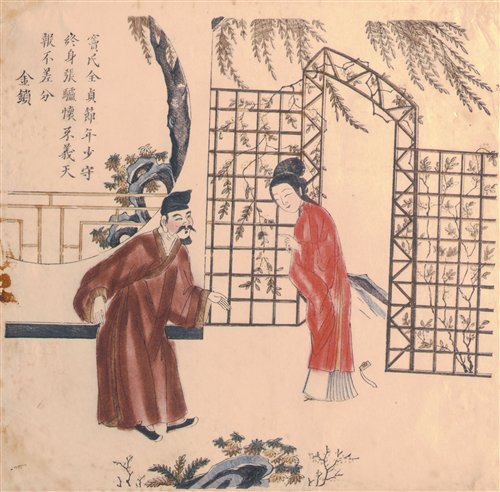
- Dou E and Donkey Zhang, print from the 17th to early 18th century
- Traditional Chinese: 竇娥冤
- Simplified Chinese: 窦娥冤
- Literal meaning: The Injustice to Dou E
Transcriptions
Standard Mandarin
- Hanyu Pinyin: Dòu É yuān
Yue: Cantonese
- Jyutping: Dau6 Ngo4 jyun1

Gan Tian Dong Di Dou E Yuan
- Traditional Chinese: 感天動地竇娥冤
- Simplified Chinese: 感天动地窦娥冤
- Literal meaning: The Injustice to Dou E that Touched Heaven and Earth
Transcriptions
Standard Mandarin
- Hanyu Pinyin: Gǎn tiān dòng dì Dòu É yuān
Yue: Cantonese
- Jyutping: gam2 tin1 dung6 dei6 Dau6 Ngo4 jyun1

Dou E Yuan, commonly translated as The Injustice to Dou E, and also known as Snow in Midsummer, is a Chinese zaju play written by Guan Hanqing (c. 1241–1320) during the Yuan dynasty. The full Chinese title of the play is Gan Tian Dong Di Dou E Yuan, which roughly translates to The Injustice to Dou E that Touched Heaven and Earth.

The story follows a child bride turned widow, Dou E, who is wrongly convicted of crimes by a corrupt court official for actions perpetrated by a rejected suitor, Zhang Lü'er. After her execution, three prophesied phenomena occur to prove her innocence, including blood raining from the sky, snow in June and a three-year drought. After a visit from the ghost of Dou E, her father eventually brings the corrupt court official, a doctor and Zhang to justice, thereby vindicating his daughter.

Today, the phrase "snowing in June" is still widely used among Chinese speakers as a metaphor for a miscarriage of justice. The story has been repeatedly used and modified by later dramatists and remains one of Guan's most popular works.

== Story ==
=== Prologue ===
Dou Duanyun, a young maiden from Chuzhou (楚州; present-day Huai'an District, Huai'an, Jiangsu), is sold to the Cai family as a child bride because her father, Dou Tianzhang, owed large amounts of money and could not repay his debts. She is renamed 'Dou E'.

=== Act 1 ===
Dou E's husband died two years after their marriage, leaving behind Dou E and her mother-in-law to depend on each other. Dou E and her mother-in-law are bullied by Sai Lu Yi, an unscrupulous physician. Sai Lu Yi almost kills Dou's mother-in-law by strangling her. Dou E and her mother-in-law are saved by the hooligan Zhang Lü'er and his father. Zhang pretends to offer them "protection" and moves into their house against their will, and then tries to force Dou E to marry him but she refuses.

=== Act 2 ===
Dou E's mother-in-law has a sudden craving for soup. Zhang Lü'er plots to murder Dou E's mother-in-law so that he can seize Dou E for himself after the older woman dies. He blackmails Sai Lu Yi for poison by threatening to report the physician to the authorities for his earlier attempt to murder Dou E's mother-in-law. He puts the poison in the soup and hopes that Dou E's mother-in-law will drink it and die. However, Zhang's father drinks the soup instead and dies from poisoning. Zhang Lü'er then frames Dou E for murdering his father.

Dou E is arrested and brought before the prefecture governor, Tao Wu, who subjects her to various tortures to force her to confess to the crime. Then Tao Wu threatens Dou E by torturing her mother-in-law. Dou E does not want her mother-in-law to be implicated so she admits to the murder. Tao Wu sentences her to death by beheading.

=== Act 3 ===
Dou E is brought to the execution ground. Before her execution, she swears that her innocence will be proven if the following three events occur after she dies:

- Her blood will spill on her white clothes, not a single drop will drip onto the ground.
- There will be heavy snowfall in the sixth lunar month (in the midst of summer) and the thick snow will cover her dead body.
- Chuzhou will experience a drought for three years.

All three events happened after Dou E's death.

=== Act 4 ===
Three years later, Dou E's ghost appears before her father, Dou Tianzhang, who has become a lianfangshi (廉訪使; a senior government official) in the Anhui and Jiangsu region, and tells him all her grievances. Dou Tianzhang orders a reinvestigation of the case and the truth finally comes to light. Dou E is posthumously proclaimed innocent while the guilty parties receive their due punishments: Sai Lu Yi is exiled to a distant land; Tao Wu is dismissed and barred from entering office again; Zhang Lü'er is given the death penalty.

Dou E also wishes that her father can allow her mother-in-law to live with him, and that he will help to take care of her mother-in-law. Dou E's father agrees. The play ends here.

== Main characters ==
- Dou E (竇娥), the main character, originally named Dou Duanyun (竇端雲). She was a devoted daughter-in-law who was framed for killing Zhang Lü'er's father and sentenced to death. Subsequently, she was ultimately proven innocent after her death.
- Dou Tianzhang (竇天章), Dou E's father. He became an official in the end and played a major role to posthumously prove his executed daughter's innocence.
- Dou E's mother-in-law, referred to as Granny Cai (蔡婆) in the play. She was originally meant to be killed by Zhang Lü'er through lethal poisoning, but in a twist of fate, she escapes death as Zhang's father was the one who drank the poison instead.
- Zhang Lü'er (張驢兒; literally "Zhang the mule" or "Zhang the donkey"), the main antagonist of the play, and the man responsible for Dou E's plight. He was eventually executed by lingchi, as retribution for his crimes.
- Zhang Lü'er's father, referred to as Zhang's father (張父) in the play. He was killed by the poison that was meant for Dou E's mother-in-law.
- Sai Lu Yi (賽盧醫; literally "equivalent to the Physician from Lu"), the physician who provided the poison that killed Zhang Lü'er's father. "Physician from Lu" (盧醫) is the nickname of Bian Que, a famous physician in ancient China. Guan Hanqing was probably adding a touch of satire or irony when he named this character.
- Tao Wu (桃杌), the corrupt prefecture governor who sentenced Dou E to death. He was later dismissed from office upon the revelation of Dou E's innocence and given a lifetime ban from taking up any governmental post.

== Problems of text and translation ==
The scholar Stephen H. West notes that the texts of Yuan drama were edited and "extensively altered" by Zang Maoxun (1550–1620), whose Yuanqu xuan (元曲選) became the standard anthology. Zang rationalised both the language and the format of the plays he edited, rather than the "coarser and more rugged – sometimes ragged – registers of language found in the early commercial editions of Yuan drama."

Almost all English translations before those in the anthology by West and Idema were based on Zang's recensions. David Rolston remarks that "West and Idema are clearly very interested in the levels of language in the plays they translate (their translations do not shy from highlighting the rawer or racier elements of plays in ways generally ignored or suppressed by other translators)." Their translations, he says, will be more useful to those who are interested in the history of the theater and the plays, while the emphasis on readability in translations based on Zang's texts, such as that by George Kao in the Columbia Anthology, will be more appealing to general readers.

== Adaptations ==
=== Chinese opera ===
The play has been adapted into kunqu, as well as a 1956 Cantonese opera, The Summer Snow (六月雪; lit. snow in June), by librettist Tang Ti-sheng.

Modern versions include the co-composition of Chen Zi and Du Yu in the 1960s, and Taiwanese composer Ma Shui-Long's 1990 version.

=== Theatre ===
A contemporary reimagining of the play was staged in 2017 by the Royal Shakespeare Company. The play was directed by Justin Audibert, translated by Gigi Chang, and specially adapted by Frances Ya-Chu Cowhig. It premiered in the US at the Oregon Shakespeare Festival in 2018.

=== Film and television ===
The play has been adapted into films and television series:

- Snow Storm in June (六月雪; luk^{6} jyut^{6} syut^{3}), a 1959 film starring Cantonese opera actress Fong Yim Fun (芳豔芬) as Dou E and actress Yam Kim Fai (任劍輝) as Cai Changzong (蔡昌宗), her husband. Both actresses had the same roles in Tang Ti-sheng's 1956 adaptation for stage performance.
- Chinese Folklore (民間傳奇), a 1976 Hong Kong television series produced by TVB, about various Chinese folk tales. One part is about Dou E, starring Louise Lee.
- Tianshi Zhong Kui (天師鍾馗; Heavenly Master Zhong Kui), a 1994 Taiwanese-Singaporean co-produced television series about Zhong Kui. One part of the series, titled Liu Yu Xue (六月雪; Snow in the Sixth Month), is about Dou E, starring Fu Juan (傅娟).
- Qian Nü Qiyuan (倩女奇冤), a 1998 Chinese television series adapted from the story of Dou E and other tales.
- Zhongguo Chuanshi Jingdian Mingju (中國傳世經典名劇), a 2005 Chinese television film series based on several well-known Chinese operas and plays. One section, spanning three episodes, is about Dou E, starring Su Jin (蘇瑾).

It is also at the centre of the plot of a 2023 Malaysian film, Snow in Midsummer.

== References and further reading ==
=== Translations ===
Translations can be found in the following volumes:

- Shih, Chung-wen (1972). Injustice to Tou O: (Tou O Yuan). Cambridge: Cambridge University Press. ISBN 0521082285. A translation and study of the play.
- Kuan, Han-ch'ing (2003). Selected Plays of Kuan Han-ch'ing (illustrated ed.). University Press of the Pacific. ISBN 1410206165.
- Liu, Jung-en (1977). Six Yüan Plays. Harmondsworth: Penguin Books. ISBN 0140442626.
- Yang, Xianyi; Yang, Gladys (2009). The Norton Anthology of Drama: Volume 1. New York: W. W. Norton & Company. ISBN 0393932818.
- West, Stephen H.; Idema, Wilt (2010). Monks, Bandits, Lovers, and Immortals: Eleven Early Chinese Plays. Indianapolis: Hackett. ISBN 9781603842006.

=== Critical studies ===
- Ao, Yumin (2015). A Study on the Thematic, Narrative, and Musical Structure of Guan Hanqing's Yuan Zaju, Injustice to Dou E. New York: Peter Lang. ISBN 978-1433130557.
- Rolston, David (2015). "(Review) The Columbia Anthology of Yuan Drama Ed. By C. T. Hsia, Wai-Yee Li, and George Kao". Asian Theatre Journal. 32 (2): 663–671. doi:10.1353/atj.2015.0056. S2CID 161272624.
- West, Stephen H. (1991). "A Study in Appropriation: Zang Maoxun's Injustice to Dou E". Journal of the American Oriental Society. 111 (2): 283–302. doi:10.2307/604020. JSTOR 604020.
