= Yin Qing =

Chinese composer

Yin Qing (Chinese: 印青; pinyin: Yìn Qīng) is a Chinese composer. His folk-music based opera The Ballad of Canal (2012) was the first modern opera based on folk music themes produced by the NCPA.
