= The Ballad of the Canal =

The NCPA official making-of documentary

The Ballad of the Canal or The Canal Ballad (Chinese: 运河谣) is a 2012 opera by composer Yin Qing based on Chinese folk music as well as Western opera styles. The title references China's Grand Canal, the longest canal or artificial river in the world. The libretto, a love story, was written by Huang Weiruo and Dong Ni.

== Description ==
The libretto, supplied by playwrights Huang Weiruo and Dong Ni, is a love story set during the Ming dynasty, and celebrates the Beijing-Hangzhou Grand Canal, the longest canal in the world.

Composer Yin Qing's use of Chinese folk music within an opera was a departure from China's National Centre for the Performing Arts's previous western-influenced Chinese-language operas. NCPA's in-house audio visual company released a "making-of" documentary, including footage of rehearsals, in July 2017.

== Performance history ==
The opera premiered at China's National Centre for the Performing Arts (NCPA) in 2012.

On September 9, 2023, a production of the opera from the NCPA, conducted by Lu Jia, was broadcast across the U.S. and elsewhere on the WFMT Radio Network Opera Series.

On 22 December 2023, the opera became the premiere performance at the new Beijing Art Center in Tongzhou District, Beijing, where the Grand Canal ends.
