= Hao Weiya =

Chinese composer

Hao Weiya (Chinese: 郝维亚, born Xi'an) is a Chinese composer. His opera A Village Teacher (2009) was announced as the first "realistic" opera produced by the NCPA and CNOH. He also created a new end for the opera Turandot of Giacomo Puccini in 2008, where he wrote a new aria for Princess Turandot.
