= Du Yu (composer) =

Chinese composer

Du Yu (Chinese: 杜宇) is a Chinese composer. He was involved in co-composition of many of the most famous Chinese-language western-style operas prior to the Cultural Revolution.

== Works ==
- Chen Zi and Du Yu (composer): Chun lei Spring thunder
- Zhang Dinghe and Du Yu: Doushi ting The poem contest pavilion
- Chen Zi and Du Yu: Dou E Yuan The grievances of Dou E, also known as Snow in Summer
- Du Yu (composer): The Gada plum blossoms Gada meilin
- Du Yu (composer): A busy country scene Ren huan ma jiao
