= Xi Shi (opera) =

NCPA poster from the 2010 premiere

Xi Shi is a 2009 Chinese-language western-style opera by woman composer Lei Lei to a libretto by Zou Jingzhi. The plot is based on the story of Xi Shi. The premiere was at Beijing's NCPA.
