= Lei Lei =

Chinese composer

Lei Lei (雷蕾) is a Chinese classical composer. She is best known for her music for TV dramas such as Plainclothes Policeman, Aspiration, and The Yellow Storm.

She has written two Chinese-language western-style operas to librettos by Zou Jingzhi: Xi Shi (opera) (2009) based on the story of Xi Shi and The Chinese Orphan (2011) based on the story The Orphan of Zhao. The premieres of both were at Beijing's NCPA.

== Works ==
- Visitors on the Icy Mountain (opera)
