= Ninth Building =

Novel by Zou Jingzhi

- Author: Zou Jingzhi
- Language: Mandarin Chinese
- Publisher: Open Letter Books (English)
- Publication date: April 11, 2023
- Pages: 208
- ISBN: 978-1-948830-75-1

Ninth Building is a novel by Zou Jingzhi. Originally written in Mandarin Chinese, it was translated to English by Jeremy Tiang and published by Honford Star in 2023.

Described as a "doculiterary" work, the novel was longlisted for the International Booker Prize, making Tiang became the first Singaporean ever nominated.

== Critical reception ==
The New Yorker, in a briefly noted review, observed that the book consisted of "fictionalized connected vignettes" and "sharp childhood recollections."

Open Letters Review, dubbing the novel an instance of Chinese "scar literature," called it "a harrowing depiction of boyhood during the Cultural Revolution."
