= Guan Hanqing =

Chinese playwright and poet

- Traditional Chinese: 關漢卿
- Simplified Chinese: 关汉卿
Transcriptions
Standard Mandarin
- Hanyu Pinyin: Guān Hànqīng
- Wade–Giles: Kuan Han-ch'ing

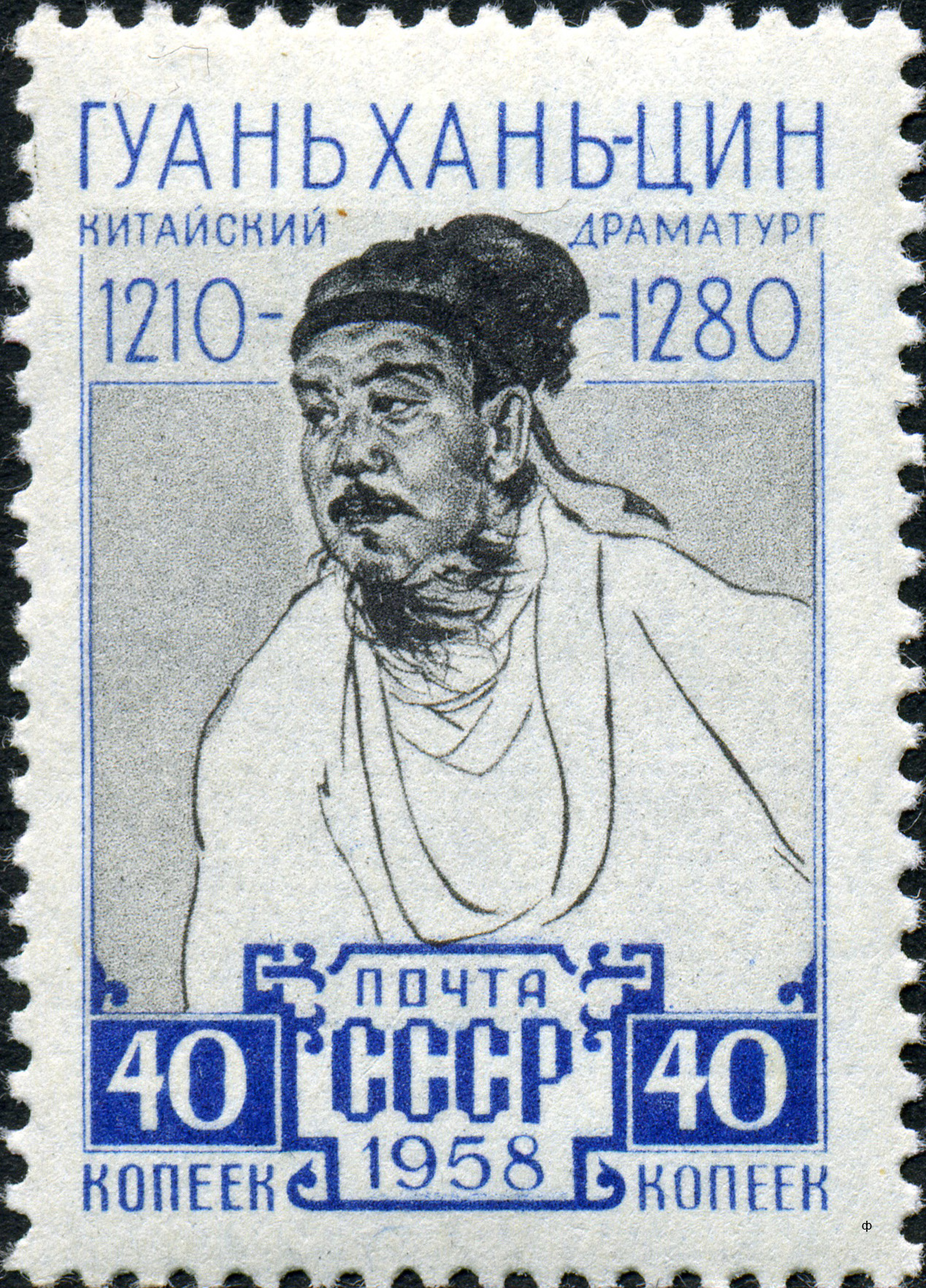
A 1958 U.S.S.R. postage stamp commemorating Guan Hanqing (transliterated Guan' Khan'-Tsin).

Guan Hanqing (traditional Chinese: 關漢卿; simplified Chinese: 关汉卿; c. 1241–1320), art names Yizhai (已齋 or 一齋) and Yizhaisou (已齋叟), was a Chinese dramatist, playwright, and poet of the Yuan dynasty. He has been described as among the most prolific and highly regarded dramatists of the Yuan period.

== Life ==
Guan Hanqing was undoubtedly the most productive and creative playwright of northern plays. Described by Jia Zhongming as "the leader of the Pear Garden" (liyuan lingxiu 梨園領袖), Guan was fully immersed in the theatrical scene of his time and was well known amongst both actors and his fellow peers. He is even said to have painted and powdered his face (mianfu fenmo 面傅粉墨) while acting on stage. He is credited with the writing of 68 plays, of which only 18 survive, three in fragments. These were written mostly in the vernacular of the time. In some cases, attribution is highly disputed. In addition to playwriting, Guan Hanqing is also said to be a master of songs (sanqu 散曲). 57 of his songs (xiaoling 小令) and 14 song suites (taoshu 套數) survive. Guan spent much of his later life in Dadu and to Hangzhou in the south. Above all, Guan Hanqing is celebrated for his uplifting portrayal of the downtrodden.

== Works ==
- The Injustice to Dou E a.k.a. Snow in Midsummer (感天動地竇娥冤 Gǎn Tiān Dòng Dì Dòu É Yuān)

The Injustice to Dou E That Touched Heaven and Earth, also known as Snow in Midsummer, is regarded as one of Guan Hanqing's most popular plays. A young girl named Dou Duanyun is sold as a child bride in order for her father to pay the necessary funds to travel to the capital for an official exam. She is then forced to change her name to "Dou E". The play begins after Dou E's husband has died two years after their marriage, leaving Dou E and her mother in law alone. After Dou's mother in law is almost strangled to death by a doctor who refused to give back the money he owed them, they are rescued by a man named Zhang Lü’er. Zhang then moves in for the purpose of "offering protection", but eventually tries to force Dou E into marriage. After Dou E's mother gets a sudden craving for soup, Zhang Lü'er devises a plan to poison her so he can take Dou E for himself. This plan however backfires and Zhang's father ends up eating the soup and dies. Dou E is framed for this crime, and is later sentenced to death after being tortured and eventually confessing to spare her step mother from torture. As she is brought to the execution ground she swears by her innocence and states that it will be proven by the following three events that will occur after her death: her blood will float up onto the hanged white ribbons but will not drip onto the ground, there will be heavy snowfall in the midst of summer that will cover her dead body, and Chuzhou will experience drought for three years. All three events happened after Dou E's death.

- Saving the Dusty-windy a.k.a. Saving the Prostitute a.k.a. Rescued by a Coquette (趙盼兒風月救風塵 Zhào Pàn Ér Fēng Yuè Jiù Fēng Chén)
- The Conference of a Single Dao a.k.a. Meeting the Enemies Alone a.k.a. Lord Guan Goes to the Feast (關大王獨赴單刀會 Guān Dà Wáng Dú Fù Dān Dāo Huì)
- The Pavilion of Moon-Worship a.k.a. The Secluded Chamber (閨怨佳人拜月亭 Guī Yuàn Jiā Rén Bài Yuè Tíng)
- A Butterfly Dream (包待制三勘蝴蝶夢 Bāo Dài Zhì Sān Kān Hú Dié Mèng)

Guan Hanqing is renowned for his courtroom dramas that typically display poetic justice in which morality and legality work hand in hand. However, this is not the case in "A Butterfly Dream". In this drama, three brothers accidentally kill a noble man whose horse trampled their father while attempting to bring him to court. The accused parties, including the mother of the three brothers, are eventually acquitted of their crimes after showing their virtuous character by attempting to accept fault for one another. This work showed a more flexible and complex version of justice than traditional confucian law allowed and discusses the grey areas between moral culpability and lawful justice.

- The Wife-Snatcher (包待制智斬魯齋郎 Bāo Dài Zhì Zhì Zhǎn Lǔ Zhāi Láng)
- The Riverside Pavilion (望江亭中秋切膾旦 Wàng Jiāng Tíng Zhōng Qiū Qiē Kuài Dàn)
- The Jade Mirror-Stand (溫太真玉鏡臺 Wēn Tài Zhēn Yù Jìng Tái)
- Death of the Winged-Tiger General (鄧夫人苦痛哭存孝 Dèng Fū Rén Kǔ Tòng Kū Cún Xiào)

== See also ==
- Zaju
- Confucianism
- Yuan Dynasty
- Legal Drama
- The Injustice to Dou E
- Kuan Han-Chʽing (crater)
