= Yuan Chenye =

Chinese opera singer

Yuan Chenye, also known as Chen-Ye Yuan (袁晨野; Dalian, 1967) is a Chinese operatic baritone. He graduated from Central Conservatory of Music in 1990 and in the same year passed entrance to the China Central Opera Company. He won the Tchaikovsky Prize in 1994 took part in the Metropolitan Opera National Council Auditions of 1998, and sang the role of Zhou Enlai in Marin Alsop's Naxos recording of Nixon in China (opera).

Chenye Yuan is also an alumnus of the renowned Peabody Conservatory of Music at Johns Hopkins University.
