= Shi Lemeng =

Chinese composer

- 时乐濛
- Born: October 12, 1915
- Died: 2008 (aged 92–93)
- Citizenship: People's Republic of China
- Occupation: Composer

Shi Lemeng (Chinese: 时乐濛; pinyin: Shí Lèméng; b.12 October 1915 – 2008) was a Chinese composer who served in the People's Liberation Army. He was born in Yichuan county, Shaanxi province in China. Among his best known works in the Chinese-language western-style opera Two Women of the Red Army (Liangge nv hongjun) to a libretto by Chen Qitong.
