= The Tale of Huai Yin =

The Tale of Huai Yin (槐荫记) is a 1958 Chinese-language western-style opera by Zhang Dinghe (张定和). It was part of the second wave of enthusiasm for geju on the eve of the 1966 beginning of the Cultural Revolution. The libretto was by Lu Su, Huang Cengjiu and Guan Taiping.

The Tale of Huai Yin is also a 1962 film.
