= Chen Ailian =

Chinese dancer (1939–2020)

Chen Ailian (陈爱莲)
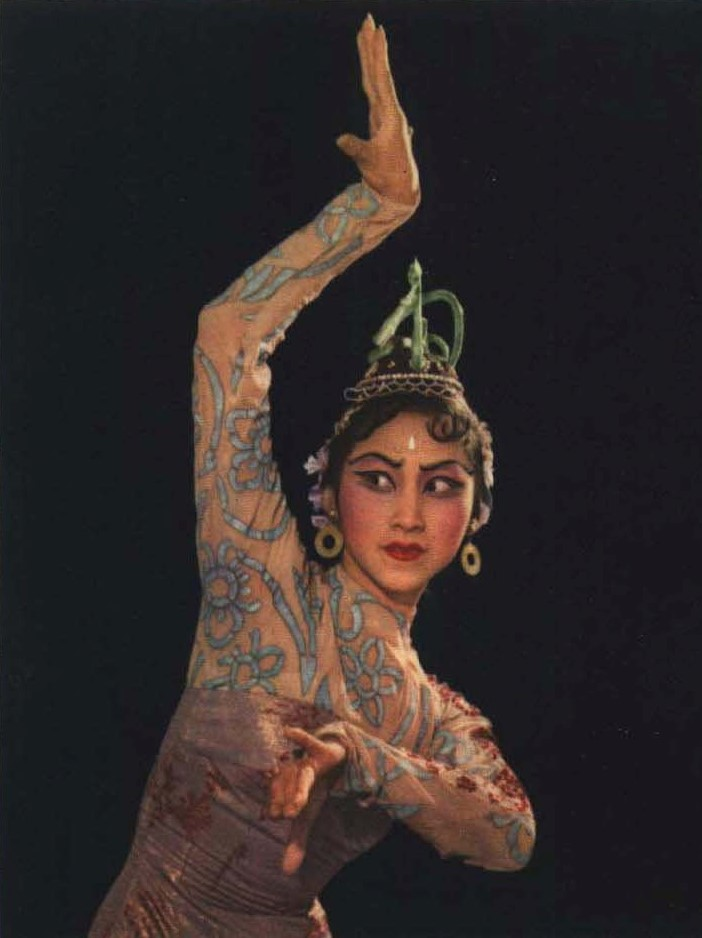
- Born: 24 December 1939; Panyu, Guangdong
- Died: 21 November 2020 (aged 80)
- Occupations: Dancer, dance teacher

Chen Ailian (Chinese: 陈爱莲; 24 December 1939 – 21 November 2020) was a Chinese dancer.

== Biography ==
She was born on 14 November according to the lunar calendar in Shanghai, and her ancestral home was Panyu, Guangdong. Her father died in 1950 and her mother in 1951 leaving her at age 11 with just her younger sister.

In 1952 she became a student at Central Academy of Drama (中央戏剧学院) in Beijing where she trained in classical Chinese dance and classical ballet with internationally renowned teachers. In 1963 she became a major trouper in China Opera and Dance-Drama Theatre. Chen is expert in the skill of dance, and is good at Chinese classical dance and folk dance. She once acted the leading role in the first performance of pantomime Fish-Beauty (《鱼美人》) in 1959. At present Chen served as the vice chairwoman of Chinese Dancers Association.

On 21 November 2020 at 00:59, she died at her home, aged 80. Before she died, she required her family to help her put on the costume of A Moonlit Night among Flowers by the Spring River (Chinese: 春江花月夜) for her in order to "leave the world without any regrets".

== Repertory ==
Chen performed lead roles in dance dramas including:

- Lady of the Sea《鱼美人》
- Red Flag《红旗》
- White Haired Girl《白毛女》
- Dagger Society《小刀会》
- Princess Wencheng《文成公主》
- Dream of the Red Chamber《红楼梦》
