= Xiao Bai =

Chinese conductor and composer (1932–2022)

Xiao Bai (Chinese: 萧白; Liaoning Province, July 1932 – April 23, 2022) was a Chinese conductor and composer. He was an ethnic Manchu. In the West, he is best known for his opera Farewell My Concubine, which toured America with the CNOH in 2008. Xiao died at a hospital in Shanghai, on April 23, 2022, at the age of 89.
