= Fangcaoxin =

Fangcaoxin (芳草心 "Fangfang, heart of grass") is a 1983 Chinese-language western-style opera or musical, and 1986 film. It was filmed as Fangcaoxin in 1986, and appears listed in some sources by an English title "The Passion and the Love."

The geju was based on the play Zhenqing jiayi (《真情假意》) by Ping Danhe which was in the repertoire of the Frontline Song and Dance Troupe (前线歌舞团). The original play was collectively edited, with a new libretto by Xiang Tong (向彤) and He Zhaohua (何兆华) and then set to music by Wang Zujie (王祖皆 b.1949) and Zhang Zhuoya (张卓娅). It had its first performance in Nanjing in 1983 by the Frontline Song and Dance Troupe. The most famous excerpt is the aria xiao cao (《小草》 "little grass").

== Plot ==
The plot concerns twin sisters Yunyun (媛媛) and Fangfang (芳芳) and their love for the engineer Yu Gang (于刚). Yu Gang is blinded in an accident and his girlfriend Yunyun deserts him, her twin sister Fangfang takes over the job of caring for Yu Gang letting him believe she is his sister. When Yu Gang's eyesight recovers Fangfang withdraws, and Yunyun returns to reclaim him, but her conscience drives her to admit the truth at their wedding. The opera is still on the repertoire of the Shanghai Opera House.
