= Yu Feng (conductor) =

Chinese conductor and academic (born 1964)

- 俞峰
- Born: 1964 (age 61–62); Ningbo, Zhejiang, China
- Education: Central Conservatory of Music (MA); Hochschule für Musik Hanns Eisler (Konzertexamen, 1996)
- Occupations: Conductor; academic
- Employer: Central Conservatory of Music
- Known for: President of the Central Conservatory of Music; first Chinese conductor to stage Wagner's complete Ring cycle; first Chinese winner of the International Young Conductors' Competition, Portugal (1991)

Yu Feng (Chinese: 俞峰; born July 1964) is a Chinese conductor and academic. He is a professor and doctoral supervisor at the Central Conservatory of Music (CCOM) in Beijing, where he has served as President, and is the former President, Artistic Director and Principal Conductor of the China National Opera House. He was the first Chinese conductor to stage Richard Wagner's complete Ring cycle, and in 1991 became the first Chinese winner of the International Young Conductors' Competition in Portugal.

== Life and education ==
Yu Feng was born in July 1964 in Ningbo, Zhejiang Province. He enrolled in the Conducting Department of the Central Conservatory of Music in 1985, studying first under Xu Xin. Owing to outstanding academic results, he completed his undergraduate studies one year early and was admitted directly to the master's programme, where he studied under Zheng Xiaoying, one of China's foremost conductors. He graduated with a Master of Arts degree in 1991 and was appointed to the teaching staff of the Conducting Department, being promoted to associate professor at the age of 28.

In 1994, Yu was awarded a German Academic Exchange Service scholarship to study at the Hochschule für Musik Hanns Eisler in Berlin, where he studied under Hans-Dieter Baum. He graduated in 1996 with the Konzertexamen, the highest diploma in conducting, equivalent to doctoral level.

== Career ==
=== Teaching and academic leadership ===
On returning to China in 1997, Yu was appointed Head of the Conducting Department at the Central Conservatory of Music, a post he held for many years alongside his role as director of the China Youth Symphony Orchestra from 1990. In this role he developed what he termed the Chinese Modern Conducting Pedagogy (现代指挥教学法), a systematic approach to conducting education with Chinese characteristics, which was awarded the second prize of the National Award for Education and Technology. He also co-founded the China Conducting Society (中国指挥学会) in 2004, serving as its president.

In February 2016, Yu was appointed President of the Central Conservatory of Music by the Ministry of Education of China. He holds additional national positions including membership of the Chinese People's Political Consultative Conference (14th session), vice-chairman of the China Musicians Association, and chair of the National Committee for Arts and Aesthetics Education in Higher Education.

In September 2021, Yu was elected Vice-Chairman and Secretary of the China Federation of Literary and Art Circles.

=== The China National Opera House ===
From 2006, Yu held a succession of positions at the China National Opera House, serving as Deputy President, President, Artistic Director and Principal Conductor. As President and Artistic Director from 2009 to 2016, he substantially expanded the institution's international repertoire and ambitions.

Under his direction, the China National Opera House staged a complete production of Richard Wagner's Der Ring des Nibelungen between 2011 and 2015, with one instalment each year: Tannhäuser (2011), Die Walküre (2013), Siegfried (2014) and Götterdämmerung (2015). The 2013 production of Die Walküre was performed entirely by Chinese singers, conductors and musicians, the first such achievement in China. The Financial Times described the Götterdämmerung as "probably an unparalleled version of Wagner's works because of its exquisite quality." Yu was the first Chinese conductor to stage Wagner's complete Ring cycle.

Chinese operas conducted by Yu at the China National Opera House that received national awards include:

- Farewell My Concubine (霸王别姬), which was also presented at Lincoln Center in New York, winning the 13th Wenhua Award
- Love Song of Rawab (热瓦普恋歌), winning the Ministry of Culture's Excellent Play Award
- Hongbang Tailor (红帮裁缝), winning the 13th Five One Project Award of the Central Propaganda Department

=== Orchestral conducting ===
Yu has conducted numerous international orchestras, including the Konzerthausorchester Berlin, Deutsches Symphonie-Orchester Berlin, Gulbenkian Orchestra of Portugal, and the Orchestra Sinfonica di Roma, of which he was principal guest conductor from 2011 to 2014. Domestically he has conducted the China Philharmonic Orchestra, China National Symphony Orchestra and Shanghai Philharmonic Orchestra, among others.

He was principal conductor of the China Youth Symphony Orchestra from 1990, leading the ensemble on international tours including performances in Hong Kong and Taiwan.

=== CCOM Symphony Orchestra ===
In December 2016, Yu founded the Central Conservatory of Music Symphony Orchestra as an international professional ensemble attached to the conservatory. In December 2019, he led the orchestra in its United States debut at Carnegie Hall in New York, conducting six US premieres of works by Chinese composers. It was also his own Carnegie Hall debut.

=== International activities ===
Yu has promoted the global dissemination of Chinese contemporary music, including partnering with Universal Edition in Vienna in 2023 and establishing a collaboration with Bard College Conservatory of Music in New York to open the first undergraduate programme in Chinese musical instrument performance at an American conservatory. He represented the music world at the 2014 symposium on arts and literature convened by Xi Jinping.

== Competitions and awards ==
In 1991 Yu won first prize in the China National Competition for Conducting. The same year he won first prize in the International Young Conductors' Competition (Concurso Internacional de Jovens Directores de Orquestra Pedro de Freitas Branco) in Portugal, becoming the first Chinese conductor to win an international conducting competition. The result was widely reported in China as "a victory for the East."

In 1994, he was awarded the gold medal for teaching excellence by the State Education Council's Fok Ying Tung Education Foundation.

He has received numerous honours from the Chinese government, including: Outstanding Contribution Expert of the State Council; the title of National Outstanding Teacher; the May Day Labour Medal of the Capital; selection into the State "Ten Thousand Talents Plan" for leading figures in philosophy and social sciences; and selection into the Central Propaganda Department's "Four Batches" talent programme.

In December 2021, Italy announced the award of the Order of the Star of Italy (Ordine della Stella d'Italia) at the rank of Officer to Yu Feng; the decoration was formally presented in Beijing in November 2023.
