= Keshan hong ri =

Keshan Hong Ri (《柯山红日》"Red Sun over Mount Ke") is a 1959 six-act Chinese-language western-style opera produced by the Opera Troupe of the People's Liberation Army's General Political Department. The music was composed by Zhuang Ying and Lu Ming. The opera tells of the PLA's actions in Tibet at the pseudonymous "Mount Ke". The following year it was made into a musical film Keshan hong ri "The Red Sun over Ke Mountains" 1960 directed by Dong Zhaoqi.
