= The Chinese Orphan =

official NCPA making of documentary

The Chinese Orphan (Chinese: 赵氏孤儿) is a 2011 Chinese-language western-style opera by woman composer Lei Lei to a libretto by Zou Jingzhi. The plot is based on the story The Orphan of Zhao. The premiere was at Beijing's NCPA in 2011. The international premiere was at the Hong Kong Cultural Centre Grand Theatre in March 2012. A documentary relating to the commissioning of the opera and with excerpts from rehearsals was one of the first releases of the NCPA's own in house audio and video company in 2017.
