= Ge Guangrui =

Chinese composer

Ge Guangrui (葛光锐, Shanghai, 1929) is a Chinese composer. His best known opera is We have our own successors (Chinese: 自有後来人 Zi you houlai ren). He also worked on Chen Zi's 1954 opera Liu Hulan.
