= Zan Yuen =

Chinese opera

1996 official DVD release

Zan Yuen (《苍原》cāngyuán "boundless grasslands") is a 1995 Chinese-language western-style opera (中国当代歌剧). The plot concerns a Mongolian tribe (Torghuts) returning from the Nogai steppe to China during the reign of the Qianlong Emperor in the Qing dynasty.

The music was composed by Xu Zhanhai (徐占海; born 1945), of the Shenyang Music Institute and Liaoning Opera, based on the plot of a radio drama series Run to the place where the sun rises (《奔向太阳升起的地方》) by screenwriter Yan Derong (阎德荣 born 1936). A DVD was recorded by the Liaoning Opera in 1996 featuring tenor Wei Song. The opera in its plot subject, music and choruses bears traces of the traditional "revolutionary" Chinese modern opera style.
