= Luo Zongxian =

Chinese composer (1925–1968)

Luo Zongxian (罗宗贤, born Baoding 1925 - 1968) was a Chinese composer. Among his best known works is the 1955 geju Caoyuan zhi ge.
