= The Hundredth Bride =

First sheet of the aria "智慧啊，亚克西" Zhìhuì a, Yàkèxī - An example of a song from the opera transcribed to jianpu for popular distribution.

The Hundredth Bride 《第一百个新娘》 is a 1980 Chinese-language western-style opera by Wang Shiguang and Cai Kexiang. The opera is set in Uygur areas. Songs from the opera were distributed using the jianpu Chinese numbered musical notation making selections from the opera more widely known.
