= Liu Hulan =

Chinese Communist revolutionary (1932–1947)

- 刘胡兰
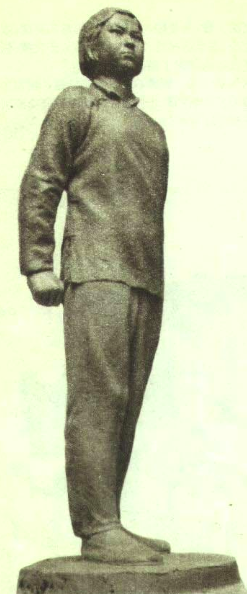
- Born: Liu Fulan (刘富兰); 8 October 1932; Yunzhouxi Village, Wenshui County, Shanxi, Republic of China
- Died: 12 January 1947 (aged 14); Yunzhouxi Village, Wenshui County, Shanxi, Republic of China
- Relatives: Liu Ailan (sister)
- Military career
- Allegiance: Chinese Communist Party
- Memorials: Liu Hulan Memorial Hall

Liu Hulan (刘胡兰, 8 October 1932 – 12 January 1947) was a Chinese communist revolutionary during the Chinese Civil War. She joined the Chinese Communist Party (CCP) in 1946 and soon after joined an association of women working in support of the People's Liberation Army (PLA). She was actively involved in organizing the villagers of Yunzhouxi in support of the CCP. Her contributions involved a wide range of activities, such as supplying food to the Eighth Liberation Army, relaying secret messages, and mending boots and uniforms.

She was executed by the KMT at age 14 or 15. The CCP, including major figures like Mao Zedong, commemorated her as a revolutionary martyr. Liu is widely regarded as the youngest martyr of the Chinese Communist Revolution and depicted in art and literature. She has been held in similar regard as Vietnamese resistance fighter Kim Đồng.

== Biography ==
On 8 October 1932, Liu Hulan was born to a middle peasant family in Yunzhouxi Village, Shanxi Province. The village was known as "Little Yan'an" because of its strong support for the Chinese Communist Revolution.

Her parents, Liu Jingqian and Wang Bianqing, named her Liu Fulan at birth, to invoke wealth (Chinese: 富; pinyin: Fù; lit. 'rich') for her future. Liu's mother, who was chronically ill, died when Liu was four years old, shortly after giving birth to her younger sister Ailan. In 1940, Liu's father married Hu Wenxiu. When Liu began attending school in 1941, Hu changed Liu's name from Fulan to Hulan on her school notebook, using the character for her surname. When school was suspended due to the intensifying Second Sino-Japanese War, Liu was homeschooled with her sister, with Hu teaching them how to read and write, as well as spin thread.

Liu's father acted as a courier for the Eighth Route Army, after the Chinese Communist Party set up an office in the village in 1938, often accompanied by his daughter. Emulating her father, who encouraged Liu to support the communists, she similarly provided the Eighth Route Army with food deliveries and intelligence. In 1942, Liu joined the CCP youth corps.

In January 1945, Liu participated in the movement of seizing grain by the Western Union and loaded grain with the revolutionaries.

In 1945, she attended a CCP women's cadre training session. She was elected as a group leader and devoted herself to study. At the local anti-hegemony meeting, she took the stage to speak, denounced the crimes of the hegemonic landlords and the feudal customs. After graduation, she served as secretary of Village Women's Rescue Committee. Liu worked in support of the Eighth Route Army on the front lines and had leadership roles in the local women's movement and the land reform movement. She organized women to run winter schools, helped the martyrs to solve difficulties, supported the army. Together with party members, she fought against landlords, delivered public grain and made military shoes, mobilized young people to join the army.

In February 1946, Liu Hulan took part in the pre-support work of the Dongzhuang battle against Yan Xishan's recalcitrant army.

In 1946, 2000 of the cotton spinning task was handed down in the country, with a deadline of 20 days. Liu Hulan led women to finished the task two days ahead of schedule and won first place in the town. In May 1946, Liu Hulan was transferred to the Woman's Officer of the 15 District "Anti-Japanese League". She returned to the West Village of Yunzhou to lead the local land reform movement.

In October 1946, Liu Hulan and her remaining comrades conveyed the CCP's instructions to the village Communist Organizations and organized the masses to bury grain.

In December 1946, Liu Hulan cooperated with the members of the martial arts team to execute the reactionary village leader Shi Pei Huai. Yan Xishan Bandit Army decided to retaliate with a large-scale attack on Wenshui area. In order to preserve strength, the eight CCP committees decided to transfer most of the cadres from Pingchuan to Shanshan. Liu Hulan was familiar with the environment, so volunteered to stay, which the party accepted. Wang Being, the company commander of the 12 regiments was wounded. Liu Hulan hid Wang Being in a military family, and carefully nursed him until he recovered. In December, the enemy frequently attacked the Western village of Yunzhou and arrested underground workers such as Shi San Huai. Liu Hulan's family advised her to withdraw, but she insisted on waiting for her superiors.

On 11 January 1947, her superior informed her to transfer. On 12 January 1947, Kuomintang troops under Yan Xishan ransacked Liu's village in a search for CCP sympathizers. The KMT troops arrested Liu and six others, executing them by beheading.

== Anecdotes ==
Liu Hulan's had two engagements in her life, a love affair and a ghost marriage. At the beginning of 1946, the parents of the two sides took the initiative to engage Liu Hulan with Chen De, a young man from the neighboring village. However, both parties advocated free love, so they agreed to go home and persuade their parents to terminate their marriage. In June of the same year, someone came to ask for relatives. Liu Hulan refused because she did not know the real situation of the man because he was not often home when he was an apprentice in Taigu County. At that time, Liu Hulan had made up her mind to pursue independent love and marriage.

In the autumn of the same year, Wang Gengu, commander of a PLA regiment, was sent to Yunzhou West Village for training. Wang Gengu suffered from severe scabies. This disease was contagious. Liu Hulan took the initiative to take care of him. Liu Hulan often went to cook and apply medicine for Wang Gengu. They had a lot of contacts and they fell in love. In those days, in the countryside where feudal ideology was more serious, this kind of behavior showed exactly an anti-feudal emancipation of the mind.

Because of the dangerous war environment and Liu Hulan's young age, her marriage with Wang Gengu has not yet been discussed. At that time, Commander Wang gave Liu Hulan's family only a blanket, a pen and a pair of glasses as a pledge. He gave Liu Hulan a small handkerchief as a souvenir when he returned to the army for combat. Liu Hulan handed the handkerchief to his stepmother, Hu Wenxiu, as the most precious item before he was sentenced to death. After Liu Hulan was murdered, Liu Guangqian, the elder uncle, managed to match ghost marriage according to local customs and sacrifices together.

In 1950, one of Liu's executioners attended a performance of the opera Liu Hulan. He broke down emotionally while seeing the audience's animosity toward the character ("Big Beard") which represented him. He was captured in 1951, put on public trial, and executed.

In 1951, two daughters and two sons of Liu Hulan's stepmother joined the People's Liberation Army to fight in the Korean War. In a letter she wrote which was published in Xinhua, Liu Hulan's stepmother urged mothers "to remember the blood debts owed to us by imperialists and the counterrevolutionaries. For our murdered children and to ensure that our children will no longer be harmed, please enthusiastically sign and vote on the Declaration on Defending World Peace and actively participate in the Korean War."

== Significance ==
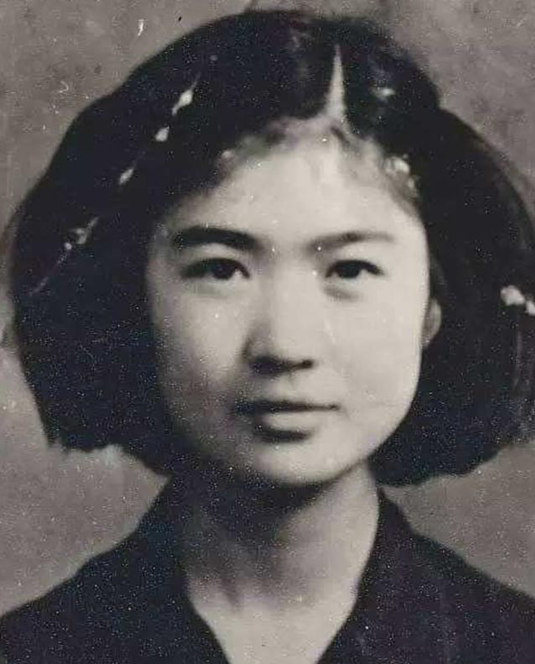
A photo of Liu Hulan's younger sister Liu Ailan, whose appearance closely resembles that of Liu Hulan herself

Liu is widely remembered in China as the youngest female martyr of the revolution.The life and death of Liu Hulan has become a symbol of the courage of the Chinese people, and is often cited as a homily of their loyalty to Communism. Her story is often told as an homage to the struggles endured, and the sacrifices made, for the cause of liberating China from centuries of rule by foreign powers. In recent history, Chinese political leaders have praised her heroism as the reason why the CCP has risen to take a dominant place in the politics and culture of modern China.

On 6 February 1947, Jinsui Daily published a detailed report on Liu Hulan's heroic inauguration and issued a comment calling on all CCP members and the military and civilians of areas under CCP control to learn from Liu Hulan. On the same day, the Yenan Liberation Daily also published an article entitled "As long as there is a breath of life, we must do it for the people to the end - female CCP member Liu Hulan generously righteous". The Jinsui Branch of the CCP has endorsed Liu Hulan as a full member of the CCP. On 26 March 1947, during Mao Zedong's transition to northern Shaanxi under the leadership of the Central Committee of the Chinese Communist Party, Ren Bishi, Secretary of the Central Secretariat, reported to him Liu Hulan's heroic deeds. Mao Zedong asked, "Is she a Party member?" Ren Bishi said, "She is an excellent Communist Party member, only 15 years old." To commemorate her martyrdom, Mao Zedong wrote, "A great life, a glorious death".

Following Mao's praise for Liu, the CCP commemorated and promoted Liu's legacy through propaganda posters, paintings, biographies, opera, film, and picture books.

An early piece of art depicting Liu as a heroic martyr was the spoken drama Liu Hulan. In Spring 1947, members of the Combat Dramatic Society founded by General He Long read an account of Liu's martyrdom in Jinsui Daily. A member of the organization interviewed Liu's family and local villagers and used these accounts to collectively write the spoken drama over the course of several weeks.

Inspired by the success of The White-Haired Girl, in 1948 the Combat Dramatic Society adapted their spoken drama into an operatic version, Liu Hulan. It was remade in 1954.

During the liberation of Shanxi in 1948, "Seeking revenge for Liu Hulan" was a widely used slogan.

Yunzhouxi Village was renamed Liu Hulan Village in Liu's honor. In 1956, the Liu Hulan Memorial Hall was established in Liu's village.

Feng Fasi's 1957 oil painting The Heroic Death of Liu Hulan is regarded as a classic socialist realist painting.

In the late 1950s, Liu's image was important in the promotion of the people's militia. As Mao Zedong called to "make everyone a soldier" and enhance civilian military training in anticipation of potential attack by the United States, Liu was characterized as a model soldier.

The Martyrs' Cemetery was built in Yunzhou West Village, the hometown of the martyrs. The Yongzhi Memorial was commemorated. The remains of Liu Hulan were moved to the cemetery separately. With a total floor area of more than 60,000 square meters, it is composed of square, monument, Liu Hulan's life story exhibition room, film and television room, calligraphy and painting room, seven Martyrs Memorial Hall and group sculptures, mausoleum, Liu Hulan statue, monument pavilion, martyr's original site, symmetrically distributed with monuments and mausoleums as the central axis, and contains 74 martyr relics.

In December 1964, the Liu Hulan Militia squad was formed in Shanxi, with Liu's sister as its leader.

On 31 January 1977, China issued a set of stamps commemorating the 30th anniversary of Liu Hulan's heroic inauguration in commemoration of Comrade Liu Hulan, the revolutionary martyr.

In 1962, Deng Xiaoping wrote the inscription, "With her noble character and her spirit, Liu Hulan is forever an exemplar for the Chinese youth to study." On 2 February 1994, General Secretary Jiang Zemin wrote an inscription encouraging the people to "carry on the spirit of Liu Hulan, dedicating oneself to the realization of the Four Modernizations." The inscriptions by Deng and Jiang are both displayed in Liu Hulan Memorial Hall.

The hay cutter used to execute Liu was acquired in a 1949 CCP campaign to locate revolutionary relics. It is on display in the National Museum of China. In 1951, Wang Zhaowen created a sculpture of Liu for the museum. It is regarded as a masterpiece of socialist art and became the official image of Liu.

Prior to 1990, commemorations and artworks of Liu tended to emphasize her status as a child martyr. After 1990, her age was no longer a point of emphasis. Changing perspectives on childhood created concerns about how to depict the death of a child and how to depict her romantic relationship.
