= Lü Jia (conductor) =

Italian conductor (born 1964)

Lü Jia (Chinese: 吕嘉; pinyin: Lǚ Jiā; born 1964 in Shanghai) is a Chinese-born Italian conductor. In 1991, when he was only 26, he was appointed as the music director of the Teatro Lirico Giuseppe Verdi and from 1991 to 1995 he was also principal conductor. In 1999, he became the principal conductor and director of the Norrköping Symphony Orchestra (until 2005). In 2007 he conducted "La gazza ladra" by Gioachino Rossini at Rossini Opera Festival in Pesaro and it was released as a DVD from Dynamic. In 2008, he became music director of the Macao Orchestra. He is currently the chief conductor of the China National Center for the Performing Arts Orchestra.
