= Visitors on the Icy Mountain (opera) =

NCPA ticket office poster

Visitors on The Icy Mountain is a Chinese contemporary classical opera composed by Lei Lei after the plot and songs of the 1963 film of the same name.
