= Caoyuan Zhi Ge =

1955 Chinese-language western-style opera

Caoyuan Zhi Ge (Mandarin: 草原之歌, literally in English: song of the steppes or song of the grasslands) is a 1955 Chinese-language western-style opera, of which its music is composed by Luo Zongxian (罗宗贤 b. 1925).
