= Ayiguli =

Chinese western-style opera

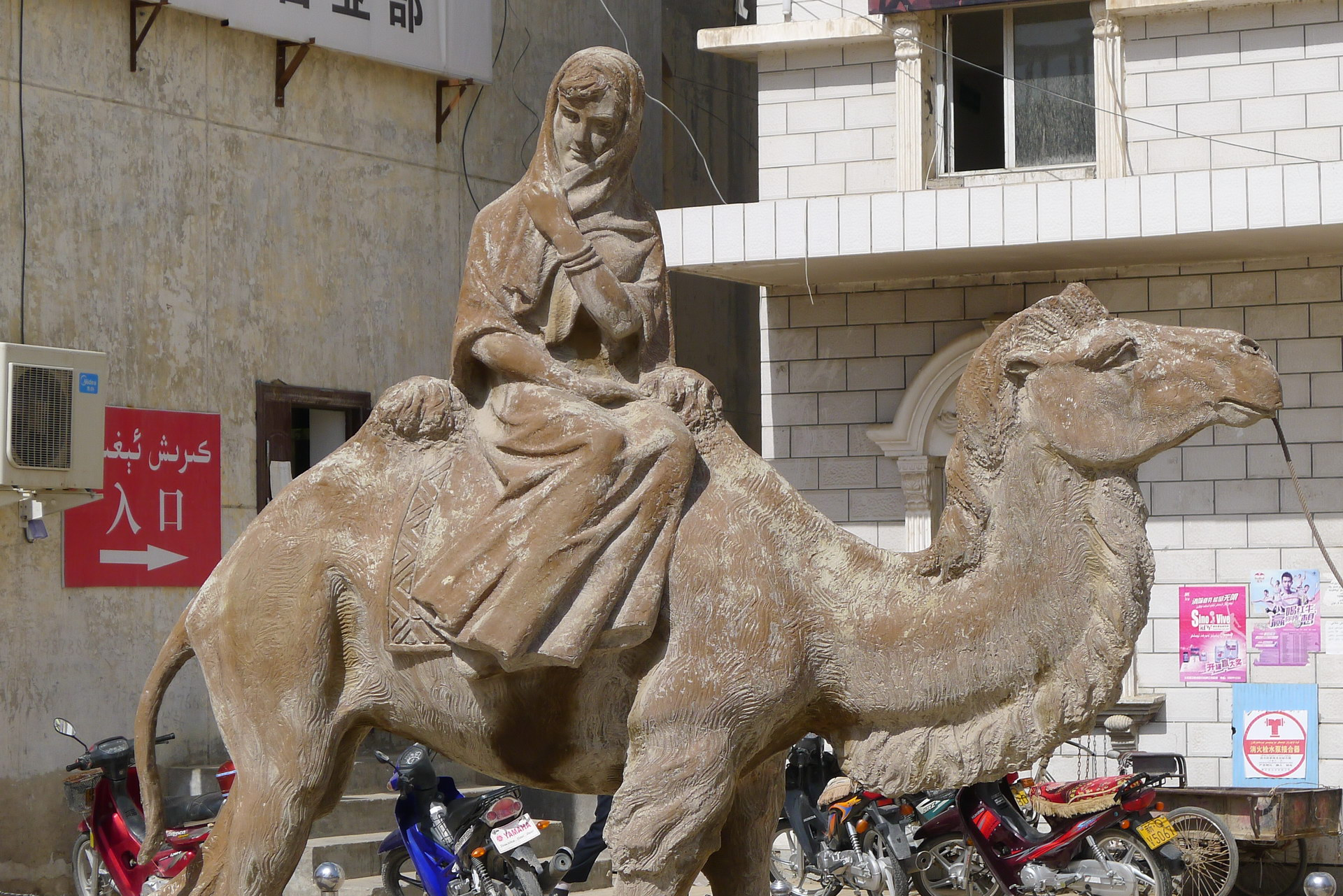
A sculpture of Ayiguli in Xinjiang.

Ayiguli (阿依古丽) is a 1966 Chinese-language western-style opera composed by Shi Fu and Wusi Manjiang. The libretto follows the script of the film Red Flowers on Tianshan (Chinese 天山上的红花). It tells the story of the Chinese Kazakh minority communist women's troupe leader Ayiguli, her education of her husband Asihar, and her struggle with anti-revolutionary elements fighting with the masses.
