= Chen Zi =

Chinese composer

Chen Zi (陈紫, Huiyang, 1919–1999) was a Chinese composer. He was one of the composers at the original revolutionary Lu Xun Academy in Yan'an and one of the collaborators assisting Ma Ke in composition of 1945's The White-Haired Girl. Among his works are the 1954 opera Liu Hulan (opera), and the 1956 opera Spring Blossoms (迎春花开了; Yingchunhua Kaile) co-composed with Liang Kexiang to a libretto by Lu Cang (陆苍) and Wang Lie (王烈).

In 1981, Xiang Sihua (guzheng player), Chen Ailian (dancer), Wang Bingyan (gaohu player), Li Yuanhua (singer), Zhang Xiaoping (dancer), Ye Jianping (dancer), Wang Shuren (erhu player), and An Qingduan (yangqin player) formed a group of Chinese performing artists from China Opera and Dance Drama Theater to visit Europe, with Chen Zi as the leader.
