= Zhang Dinghe =

Chinese conductor and composer

Zhang Dinghe (张定和, Hefei, 1916–2011) was a Chinese composer and conductor. He composed the music for the 1958 opera The Tale of Huai Yin, as well as many songs, ballets, and film music.
