= Red Guards on Honghu Lake =

Red Guards on Honghu Lake (Chinese: 洪湖赤卫队) is a Chinese modern opera in six acts. It was first performed in October 1956 in Wuhan, Hubei by the Hubei Experimental Theater Society (湖北省实验歌剧团). It is set in Honghu, Hubei. Its music was composed by Zhu Benhe, Zhang Jing'an, and Ouyang Qianshu. It was adapted to the cinema in 1961.

== Plot synopsis ==
The opera is based on a true story. In the summer of 1930, a landlord of Pengjiadun named Peng Batian takes advantage of the departure of the Red Army, cooperating with colonel Feng of the Kuomintang to attack the Honghu Base Area. Secretary Han Ying and Captain Liu Chuang lead the Red Guards to withdraw, then raid Pengjiadun with the help of an Underground Party spy, lieutenant Zhang, seizing all the weapons and cartridges of the Kuomintang Army. Peng Batian is ashamed into anger, and bullies the villagers to confess the whereabouts of Han Ying and the Red Guards. Han Ying is arrested for rescuing the villagers. Peng Batian gets hold of Han's mother, attempting to influence Han Ying, but fails. Lieutenant Zhang brings Han Ying off, but loses his own life. Han Ying leads the Guards to annihilate the Vigilance Group and Baiji Society along with the 2nd Red Army at last.
