= A Village Teacher =

2009 opera by Hao Weiya

Official 2010 NCPA premiere poster

A Village Teacher (Chinese: 山村女教师) is a 2009 Chinese-language western-style opera by composer Hao Weiya to a libretto by Liu Heng. Liu is well known for the scripts to films like Ju Dou, The Knot, and Assembly.

The opera was announced as "the first realistic opera produced by the NCPA". The premiere was directed by Chen Xinyi with stage designs by Gao Guangjian, conducted by Lü Jia. In September 2021, the opera was rearranged under the name Summer Rainbow (夏日彩虹) by NCPA.
