= Ma Ke (composer) =

Chinese composer (1918–1976)

Ma Ke (simplified Chinese: 马可; traditional Chinese: 馬可; pinyin: Mǎ Kě; 1918 – July 27, 1976) was a Chinese composer and musicologist, best known for his patriotic songs, including "Nanniwan".

Ma was born into a Christian family, at Xuzhou, Jiangsu, and his name was said to be derived from the saint Mark. Having enjoyed chemistry in high school, he studied it at Henan University, where he encountered the composer Xian Xinghai. Ma suspended his studies and became a follower of Xian, including an anti-Japanese roadshow tour of the country. In 1939, Ma traveled to Yan'an. On Xian's recommendation, he studied at Luxun Academy of Arts with composer Lü Ji and others. He began to collect and record many Chinese folk songs. In 1947, he joined the Chinese Communist Party. After 1949, he was appointed the Vice President of the China Conservatory of Music and the head of the Chinese Opera House.

He composed more than 200 musical works, including "Nanniwan"; We are Democratic Youth (我们是民主青年); Powerful Workers (咱们工人有力量); Lüliang Mountains Cantata (吕梁山大合唱); the yangge opera The Couple Learn to Read (夫妻识字); the opera Zhou Zishan (周子山) (co-composed with Zhang Lu (张鲁) and Liu Chi); The White Haired Girl with Ju Wei, Zhang Lu, and Xiang Yu; Xiaoerhei's Marriage (小二黑结婚); and the orchestral piece The North Shanxi Suite (陕北组曲).

As a musicologist, he devoted special study to the work of Xian Xinghai and wrote a biography about the composer. He also studied the development of modern Chinese music drama and China's tradition of revolutionary music, writing several books and approximately 200 papers. In 1978, a partial collection of his songs was published.

A festival dedicated to Ma Ke, called the China Xuzhou Ma Ke Art Festival, was held in Xuzhou in June 2004.

Ma and his wife, Yang Wei (Chinese: 杨蔚), had three daughters: Haixing (Chinese: 马海星), Haiying (Chinese: 马海滢), and Hailing (Chinese: 马海玲).
