= Farewell My Concubine (modern opera) =

Opera by Xiao Bai

2010 production official poster

Farewell My Concubine (Chinese: 歌剧《霸王别姬》, geju "Bawang bie ji") is a Chinese-language Western-style opera composed by choral conductor and composer Xiao Bai (萧白), to a libretto by Wang Jian (王健) for the China National Opera House, which toured the United States in 2008.

The opera is unrelated to the soundtrack to Chen Kaige's Farewell My Concubine, which was composed by Zhao Jiping.
