= The White-Haired Girl =

Chinese ballet, opera, and films

- Directed by: Bin Wang; Shui Hua
- Written by: Bin Wang; Shui Hua
- Starring: Bin Wang; Shui Hua
- Cinematography: Weiyun Wu
- Edited by: Fumiko Kishi
- Music by: Ma Ke
- Production company: Changchun Film Studio
- Release date: March 11, 1951
- Country: China
- Language: Mandarin

Ma Ke (composer)

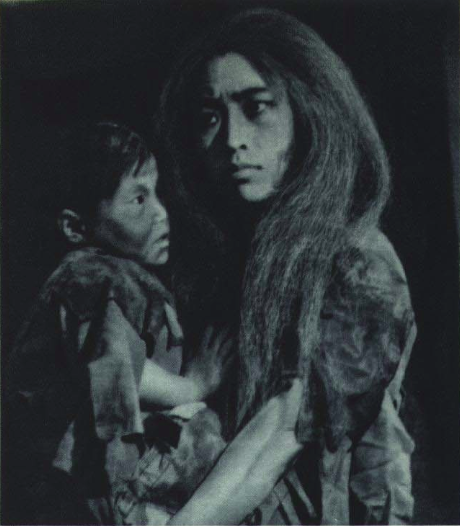
The White-Haired Girl with The White-Haired Kid in the opera.

The White-Haired Girl (Chinese: 白毛女; pinyin: Bái Máo Nǚ) is a Chinese contemporary classical opera by Ma Ke and others to a Chinese libretto by He Jingzhi and Ding Yi. It was later adapted to a ballet, a Peking opera, and films. The ballet adaptation was regarded as a revolutionary opera and promoted by the Chinese Communist Party (CCP) as a model revolutionary work.

The plot centers on a young peasant woman who flees persecution by an evil landlord and lives in a dark cave until CCP forces bring her back to the sunlit world (with some of the plot elements being revised over time and in different adaptations). The central theme of the story, in the words of the opera, is that "the Old Society changed people into ghosts, while the New Society changes ghosts into people."

In the original version, the heroine becomes pregnant after being raped by the villainous landlord. After she realizes she is pregnant, she initially hopes to marry her attacker, but ultimately runs away when she realizes that she is to be sold off.

The opera drew inspiration from stories circulating in the border region of Shanxi, Chahar and Hebei, describing the misery suffered by local peasantry (especially women and girls), particularly a folk story called The White-Haired Fairy Maiden.

Along with Red Detachment of Women, the ballet is regarded as one of the classics in the People's Republic of China, and its music is familiar to almost everyone who grew up during the 1960s. It is one of the Eight Model Operas approved by Jiang Qing during the Cultural Revolution.

== History and development ==
In the 1942 Yan'an Talks, Mao Zedong stated that literature and art should better serve the revolutionary causes and to assist the Chinese Communist Party (CCP) to "overthrow our national enemy and accomplish our task of national liberation". In Mao's view, revolutionary literature and art should serve the masses (primarily workers, peasants and soldiers) by telling their stories in languages they can understand and relate to. For example, writers and artists were encouraged to positively approach the budding literature and art of the masses, including wall newspapers, folk songs and folk tales. The White-Haired Girl became a classic example of the approach described in the Yan'an Talks and of the revolutionary style more broadly.

In May 1944, the Northwest Battleground Service Corps returned to Yan'an after five years in the northern China front lines with the folk story of the White-Haired Fairy Maiden. Reconstructions of the White-Haired Fairy Maiden suggest three variations or possible origins, with the common story elements of village landlords abusing their power over a young peasant woman and the traditional biases favoring boys over girls. The story gained the attention of cultural workers in Yan'an who wanted to adapt it.

Artists of the Lu Xun Academy of Arts in Yan'an turned the story of the White-Haired Fairy Maiden into the opera of The White-Haired Girl. It drew inspiration from legends circulating in the border region of Shanxi, Chahar and Hebei, describing the misery suffered by local peasantry, particularly the misery of the female members.

The opera was first performed in April 1945 in Yan'an as a tribute to the Seventh National Congress of the CCP. It was one of the first large scale theatrical productions created in Yan'an. Mao arrived late the first time he went to watch the opera. Mao was not personally involved in the creation of the show, but must have approved of the show,. Party leaders did send the creators a note asking for the landlord to be executed at the end. The White-Haired Girl was immediately regarded as a success and promoted as a "must-show" production in other CCP-governed areas. Lu Xun Academy of Arts continued to refine the piece thereafter, with a focus on the theme of national salvation. From the 1940s to the 1970s, The White-Haired Girl had multiple stage and film versions.

The Japanese Matsuyama Ballet company performed the opera in 1955. The Matsuyama ballet version was based on the 1950 film. The company toured its version in Beijing in 1955.

In 1964, the Shanghai Ballet Academy adapted The White-Haired Girl into a ballet-opera. This version developed from the political trend of creating new-style Peking operas. It drew on a variety of artistic traditions, including Western ballet, traditional Chinese dance and folk dance, martial arts, and Chinese musical drama.

Touring productions of The White-Haired Girl in both countries facilitated a period of "ballet diplomacy". This cultural exchange helped normalize Sino-Japanese relations, enabling officials like Sun Pinghua to establish bilateral trust.

By the Cultural Revolution, when a ballet version of the show became a model work, the portrayal of the characters was totally revised. Now the landlord could barely menace the strong peasant characters, robbing the show of the original’s emotional charge.

The story was so popular and well regarded at one point that making a film about it became a way for filmmakers to display their loyalty to the cultural radicals of the Cultural Revolution.By the early 1990s, theatrical productions of The White-Haired Girl had played to over one million audience members in total.

In 2015, the Ministry of Culture of the People's Republic of China followed Xi Jinping's Speech at the Forum on Literature and Art, and launched a revival tour of The White-Haired Girl. Under Peng Liyuan's artistic direction, the performance began in Yan'an. The tour incorporated 3D visual effects and ended in Beijing in mid-December 2015. The China National Opera has periodically featured the revival thereafter, including in 2021 for the 100th Anniversary of the CCP.

Tracing the evolution of the story from the period before the revolution through the revolution and post-revolutionary periods shows how politics affects performance and how performance spins history.

== Film and television ==
Film versions of The White-Haired Girl used ghost story and horror movie aesthetics to move their audiences.

A film version released in 1950 coincided with the Land Reform Movement. In the context of Mao-era cinema, the film was part of a genre of redemptive melodramas which encouraged the audiences to "speak bitterness". The 1950 film version won an international film award in Czechoslovakia.

The White-Haired Girl was re-released in the mid-1960s alongside new films intended support the Socialist Education Movement as "emphasis films".

In 1970, Shanghai Television made a television version of the ballet in black-and-white.

As one of the revolutionary model operas during the Cultural Revolution, The White-Haired Girl was revised into a color film in 1972. Both the 1970 television version and the 1972 film were directed by Sang Hu with cinematography by Shen Xilin. The 1970 television version and 1972 film also had the same cast.

== Plot ==
The plot centers on a young peasant woman who flees persecution by an evil landlord and lives in a dark cave until the CCP's military brings her back to the sunlit world.

=== Initial opera version ===
In 1935, landlord Huang Shiren covets Xi'er, a 17-year old peasant girl. Landlord Huang forces Xi'er's father (Yang Bailao) to sell Xi'er to him in order to pay debts. Ridden with guilt for selling his daughter to the landlord, Yang kills himself on the eve of the New Year.

Xi'er must part with her fiancé from a peasant family (Dachun) and go to the landlord's house. There, she is abused by the landlord's Buddhist mother on a daily basis. Huang ultimately rapes Xi'er, resulting in her pregnancy. Huang and his mother make plans to sell the pregnant Xi'er and Xi'er flees to the mountains where she gives birth.

Xi'er lives in the wilderness for three years. Her clothing becomes ragged and her hair and skin turn white. Looking like a ghost, she is observed by villagers stealing food offerings from a temple altar and assumed to be a White-Haired Fairy Maiden.

Xi'er is ultimately rescued by Dachun, who left the village to join the CCP's military and has returned. Landlord Huang is subjected to struggle sessions and his land and property is redistributed to the poor. Xi'er, Dachun, and the villages live happily afterwards.

=== Differences among adaptations ===
The famous line sung by the chorus that "The Old Society turned people into ghosts, and the New Society turns ghosts back into people" was added in late 1945.

The White-Haired Girl had various changes in its adaptations from the 1950s through the 1970s.

Earlier theatrical productions show landlord Huang's arrest at the conclusion of the performance. As the political climate changed over time, both audience reaction and ultimately a CCP directive resulted in a revision to the story for landlord Huang to be executed. The 1972 film also includes three gunshots to demonstrate that Huang is executed after his trial.

Pre-1953 versions use the imagery of the ghost and sun to allude to the old society and the new society of China. By 1972, the introduction of lines such as "Long Live the Communist Party! Long, Long Live Chairman Mao!" and "Beloved Chairman Mao, People's Great Savior!" emphasized explicitly the role of the Party and Mao Zedong.

During the Cultural Revolution, the ballet was revised to remove the elements of romantic love between Xi'er and Dachun, instead focusing on their mutual class feeling. These revisions included removing Dachun's expression of love for Xi'er from the final scene.

In the original opera and movie adaptation, Xi'er's father, Yang Bailao, committed suicide in despair at his helplessness against the landlord. This portrayal was originally met with sympathy from audiences. In the 1964 ballet, however, suicide was considered politically submissive, and Yang was rewritten as being shot dead while resisting the landlord with his shoulder pole.

In the 1972 ballet, Xi'er fights heroically against Landlord Huang's attempt to rape her. She successfully fends off his rape attempt and escapes.

== Analysis ==
As academic Lintao Qi notes, The White-Haired Girl's ideological function was to exemplify the CCP's narrative of class struggle and redemption through socialism, aligning cultural production with national political goals. In Chinese culture, white is traditionally associated with ghosts and Its use in depicting Xi'er as a ghostly figure expressed the struggle of the oppressed peasant class and the Chinese nation. The character Dachun is intended to personify the peasantry's self-identification with the CCP's cause. There is a mythic tale that the white haired goddess in the Qing Dynasty lived off of temple offerings and disappeared when humans approached it.

The portrayal of landlord Huang's mother as a devoted Buddhist who nonetheless abuses Xi'er critiques religion and traditional culture. According to academic Xiaofei Kang, "The image of Huang's mother evokes the predatory old woman whose exhaustion of feminine fertility terrorizes young lives in folk culture."

Scholars have noted the opera's use of Wagnerian-style leitmotifs: recurring musical themes tied to characters and emotional shifts. These motifs reinforce Xi'er's psychological journey and underscore dramatic tension, effectively propelling the narrative and deepening audience engagement.

== Decline and revival ==
The political context of the opera and film faded after China's Reform and Opening Up policy in 1978. With a new generation of culture and diverse ideas, class struggle and landlord oppression were less relevant. When the Shanghai Dance Troupe performed the ballet in Qingdao in 1981, they were booed by the audience for trying to remove revolutionary elements. The work continued to lose popularity, with performances only occurring on political milestones, such as anniversaries of Mao's Yan'an Talks, until its revival in 2015 by the Ministry of Culture of the People's Republic of China.

Research such as Ellan A. Lincoln-Hyde's paper in Asian Musicology has criticized the state-sponsored revival of The White-Haired Girl, arguing that the work perpetuates ableist and sexist tropes in modern society.

== Original cast in 1950 film ==
In order of appearance:

Zhao Lu as Old Zhao.

Zhang Shouwei as Yang Bailao.

Tian Hua as Xi'er.

Hu Peng as Wang Dashen [Auntie Wang].

Li Baiwan as Dachun.

Chen Qiang as Huang Shiren.

Li Renlin as Mu Renzhi.

Li Bo as Madame Huang.

Guan Lin as Zhang Ershen [Aunt Zhang].

Zhang Ying as Dasuo.

Wang Feng as Huzi [Tiger].

Zhang Yan as Lao Wushu [Fifth Uncle].

Sun Fengqin as Xiao Yatou [Maidservant].

Gao Ping as Laotou [Old Man].

Fu Jia as Lao Shuishou [Boatman].

== Track listing for opera soundtrack ==
The White Haired Girl
No.	Title	Lyrics	Music	Performed By	Length
1.	"Overture"	He Jingzhi; Zhang Songru	Qu Wei; Zhang Lu; Ma Ke	Wang Kun; Meng Yu; Zhang Ping; Li Yaodong; Changchun Film Studio Orchestra; Yin Shengshan; Li Bingshen	3:21
2.	"North Wind Blows"	He Jingzhi; Zhang Songru	Qu Wei; Zhang Lu; Ma Ke	Wang Kun; Meng Yu; Zhang Ping; Li Yaodong; Changchun Film Studio Orchestra; Yin Shengshan; Li Bingshen	2:25
3.	"A Huge Snowstorm"	He Jingzhi; Zhang Songru	Qu Wei; Zhang Lu; Ma Ke	Wang Kun; Meng Yu; Zhang Ping; Li Yaodong; Changchun Film Studio Orchestra; Yin Shengshan; Li Bingshen	2:37
4.	"Tying the Plait With a Red Ribbon"	He Jingzhi; Zhang Songru	Qu Wei; Zhang Lu; Ma Ke	Wang Kun; Meng Yu; Zhang Ping; Li Yaodong; Changchun Film Studio Orchestra; Yin Shengshan; Li Bingshen	2:37
5.	"Dunning"	He Jingzhi; Zhang Songru	Qu Wei; Zhang Lu; Ma Ke	Wang Kun; Meng Yu; Zhang Ping; Li Yaodong; Changchun Film Studio Orchestra; Yin Shengshan; Li Bingshen	0:58
6.	"Bidding a Farewell to the Outgoing Year"	He Jingzhi; Zhang Songru	Qu Wei; Zhang Lu; Ma Ke	Wang Kun; Meng Yu; Zhang Ping; Li Yaodong; Changchun Film Studio Orchestra; Yin Shengshan; Li Bingshen	1:28
7.	"Dazzled by the Red Lamps under the Eaves"	He Jingzhi; Zhang Songru	Qu Wei; Zhang Lu; Ma Ke	Wang Kun; Meng Yu; Zhang Ping; Li Yaodong; Changchun Film Studio Orchestra; Yin Shengshan; Li Bingshen	3:04
8.	"Mercy, Heavens!"	He Jingzhi; Zhang Songru	Qu Wei; Zhang Lu; Ma Ke	Wang Kun; Meng Yu; Zhang Ping; Li Yaodong; Changchun Film Studio Orchestra; Yin Shengshan; Li Bingshen	2:07
9.	"Nine out of Ten Households are Dark"	He Jingzhi; Zhang Songru	Qu Wei; Zhang Lu; Ma Ke	Wang Kun; Meng Yu; Zhang Ping; Li Yaodong; Changchun Film Studio Orchestra; Yin Shengshan; Li Bingshen	1:30
10.	"Xi’er, you have fallen asleep"	He Jingzhi; Zhang Songru	Qu Wei; Zhang Lu; Ma Ke	Wang Kun; Meng Yu; Zhang Ping; Li Yaodong; Changchun Film Studio Orchestra; Yin Shengshan; Li Bingshen	2:02
11.	"After Daddy Came Back Home Last Night"	He Jingzhi; Zhang Songru	Qu Wei; Zhang Lu; Ma Ke	Wang Kun; Meng Yu; Zhang Ping; Li Yaodong; Changchun Film Studio Orchestra; Yin Shengshan; Li Bingshen	2:10
12.	"Wishing Longevity to Old People and Happiness to the Whole Family in the New Year Celebration"	He Jingzhi; Zhang Songru	Qu Wei; Zhang Lu; Ma Ke	Wang Kun; Meng Yu; Zhang Ping; Li Yaodong; Changchun Film Studio Orchestra; Yin Shengshan; Li Bingshen	3:33
13.	"I Hear Loud Noise"	He Jingzhi; Zhang Songru	Qu Wei; Zhang Lu; Ma Ke	Wang Kun; Meng Yu; Zhang Ping; Li Yaodong; Changchun Film Studio Orchestra; Yin Shengshan; Li Bingshen	2:09
14.	"After Midnight"	He Jingzhi; Zhang Songru	Qu Wei; Zhang Lu; Ma Ke	Wang Kun; Meng Yu; Zhang Ping; Li Yaodong; Changchun Film Studio Orchestra; Yin Shengshan; Li Bingshen	5:10
15.	"Heaven, You’d Better Kill Me"	He Jingzhi; Zhang Songru	Qu Wei; Zhang Lu; Ma Ke	Wang Kun; Meng Yu; Zhang Ping; Li Yaodong; Changchun Film Studio Orchestra; Yin Shengshan; Li Bingshen	4:53
16.	"I Want to Live"	He Jingzhi; Zhang Songru	Qu Wei; Zhang Lu; Ma Ke	Wang Kun; Meng Yu; Zhang Ping; Li Yaodong; Changchun Film Studio Orchestra; Yin Shengshan; Li Bingshen	3:43
17.	"Hatred as Deep as Ocean"	He Jingzhi; Zhang Songru	Qu Wei; Zhang Lu; Ma Ke	Wang Kun; Meng Yu; Zhang Ping; Li Yaodong; Changchun Film Studio Orchestra; Yin Shengshan; Li Bingshen	4:33
18.	"I am a Human Being"	He Jingzhi; Zhang Songru	Qu Wei; Zhang Lu; Ma Ke	Wang Kun; Meng Yu; Zhang Ping; Li Yaodong; Changchun Film Studio Orchestra; Yin Shengshan; Li Bingshen	3:41
19.	"The Sun Has Risen"	He Jingzhi; Zhang Songru	Qu Wei; Zhang Lu; Ma Ke	Wang Kun; Meng Yu; Zhang Ping; Li Yaodong; Changchun Film Studio Orchestra; Yin Shengshan; Li Bingshen	2:59
20.	"I Want to Speak Out"	He Jingzhi; Zhang Songru	Qu Wei; Zhang Lu; Ma Ke	Wang Kun; Meng Yu; Zhang Ping; Li Yaodong; Changchun Film Studio Orchestra; Yin Shengshan; Li Bingshen	9:06
21.	"We Want to be Masters of Our Own Fate"	He Jingzhi; Zhang Songru	Qu Wei; Zhang Lu; Ma Ke	Wang Kun; Meng Yu; Zhang Ping; Li Yaodong; Changchun Film Studio Orchestra; Yin Shengshan; Li Bingshen	1:14
