= National Centre for the Performing Arts (China) =

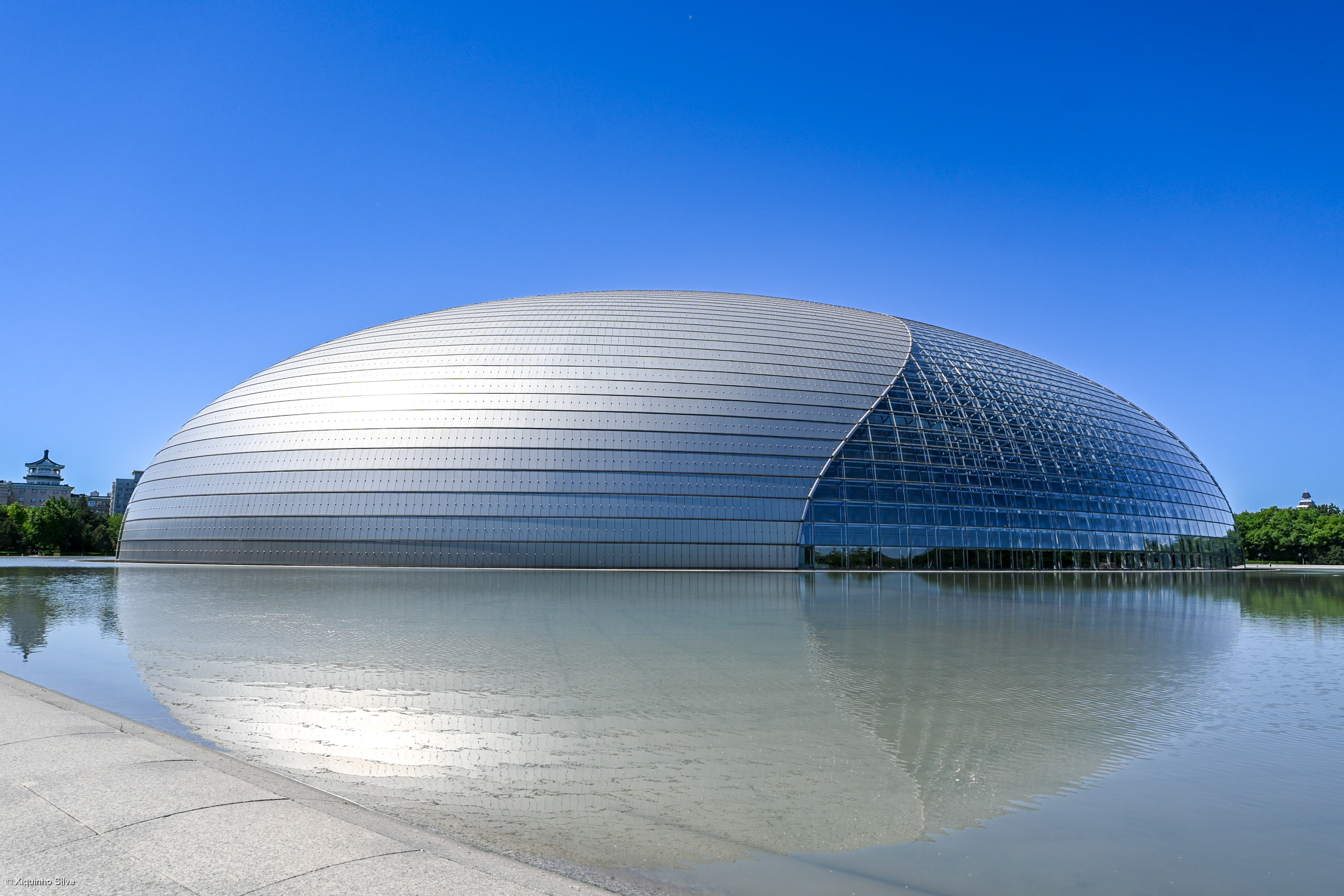

General information
- Type: Arts complex
- Location: Beijing, China, No.2 West Chang'an Avenue, Xicheng District, Beijing
- Coordinates: 39°54′12″N 116°23′1″E
- Construction started: December 2001
- Completed: July 2007
- Opened: December 2007
- Cost: €300 million

Height
- Height: 46.28 m

Technical details
- Structural system: Ellipsoid dome of titanium and glass surrounded by an artificial lake
- Floor area: 219,400 m^{2}

Design and construction
- Architect: Paul Andreu

The National Centre for the Performing Arts (NCPA) (国家大剧院), colloquially described as The Boiled Egg (水煮蛋), is an arts centre containing an opera house in Xicheng, Beijing, China. Designed by French architect Paul Andreu, the NCPA opened in 2007 and is the largest theatre complex in Asia. The NCPA is semi-spherical in appearance, with a long axis length of 212.20 meters in the east-west direction, a short axis length of 143.64 meters in the north-south direction, a height of 46.285 meters, an area of 119,900 square meters, and a total construction area of approximately 165,000 square meters, including 105,000 square meters of main buildings and 60,000 square meters of underground, auxiliary facilities, with a total cost of 3.067 billion yuan. The centre contains an opera hall, music hall, theater and art exhibition halls, restaurants, audio shops, and other supporting facilities.

== Architecture ==
=== Construction ===
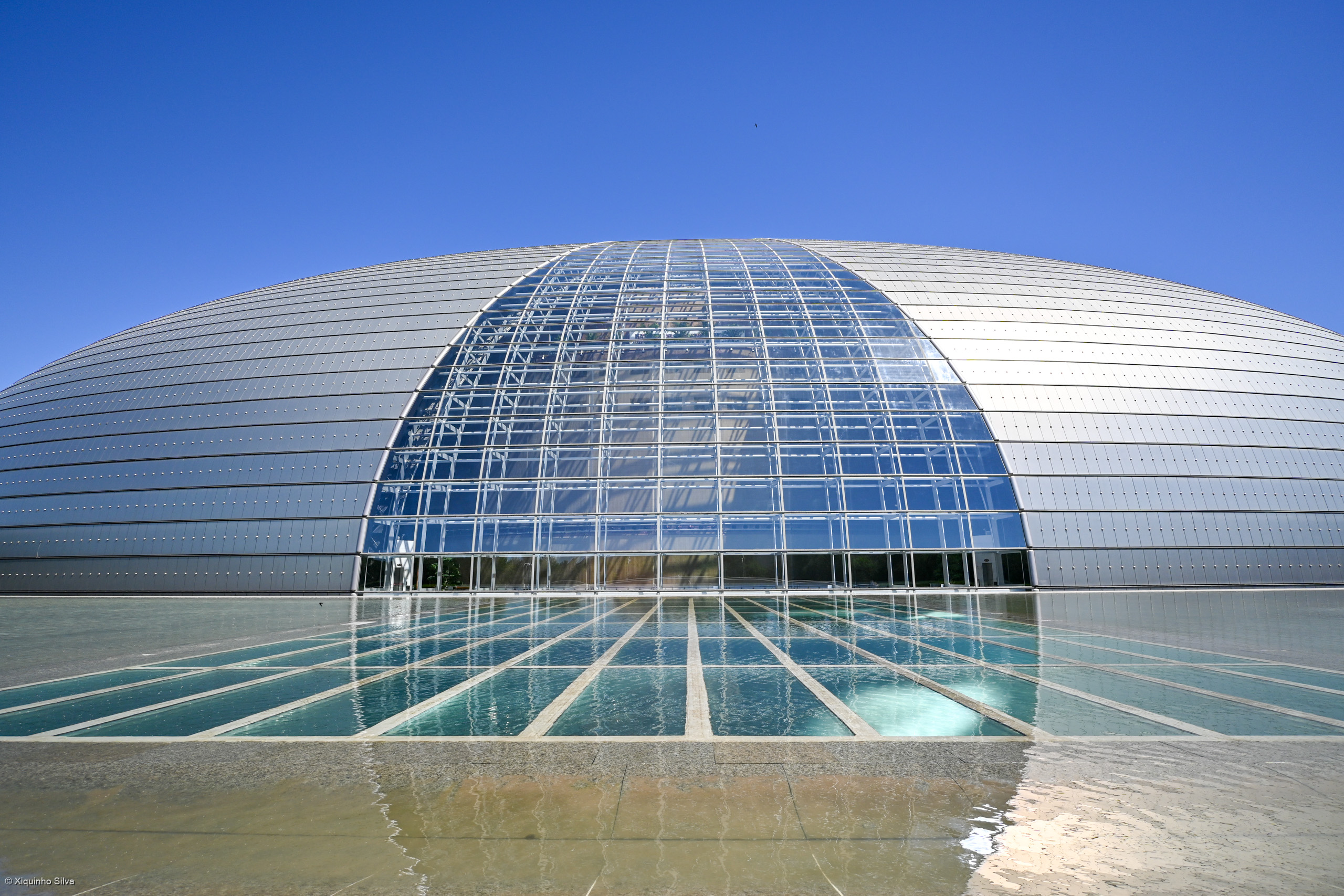
Glass curtain wall of the building

The exterior of the NCPA is a steel structural shell. It has a semi-ellipsoidal shape. The length of the long axis in the east-west direction of the plane projection is 212.20 m (696.2 ft), the length of the short axis in the north-south direction is 143.64 m (471.3 ft), and the height of the building is 46.285 m (151.85 ft), which is slightly lower than the Great Hall of the People, by 3.32 meters. The deepest part of the foundation reaches 32.5 m (107 ft). This is as tall as ten floors. The large theatre shell is made up of more than 18,000 pieces of titanium metal plates, covering an area of more than 30,000 m^{2} (320,000 sq ft). Of the more than 18,000 pieces of titanium metal plates, only four are the same shape. The titanium metal plate is specially oxidized, and its surface metallic lustre is very textured and has a consistent colour for 15 years. The middle part is an involute glass curtain wall, which is made up of more than 1,200 pieces of ultra-white glass. The ellipsoidal shell surrounds the artificial lake, with a surface area of 34,300 square meters, and all channels and entrances are located below the water surface. Pedestrians need to enter the performance hall from an 80-meter underwater passage.

=== Design ===
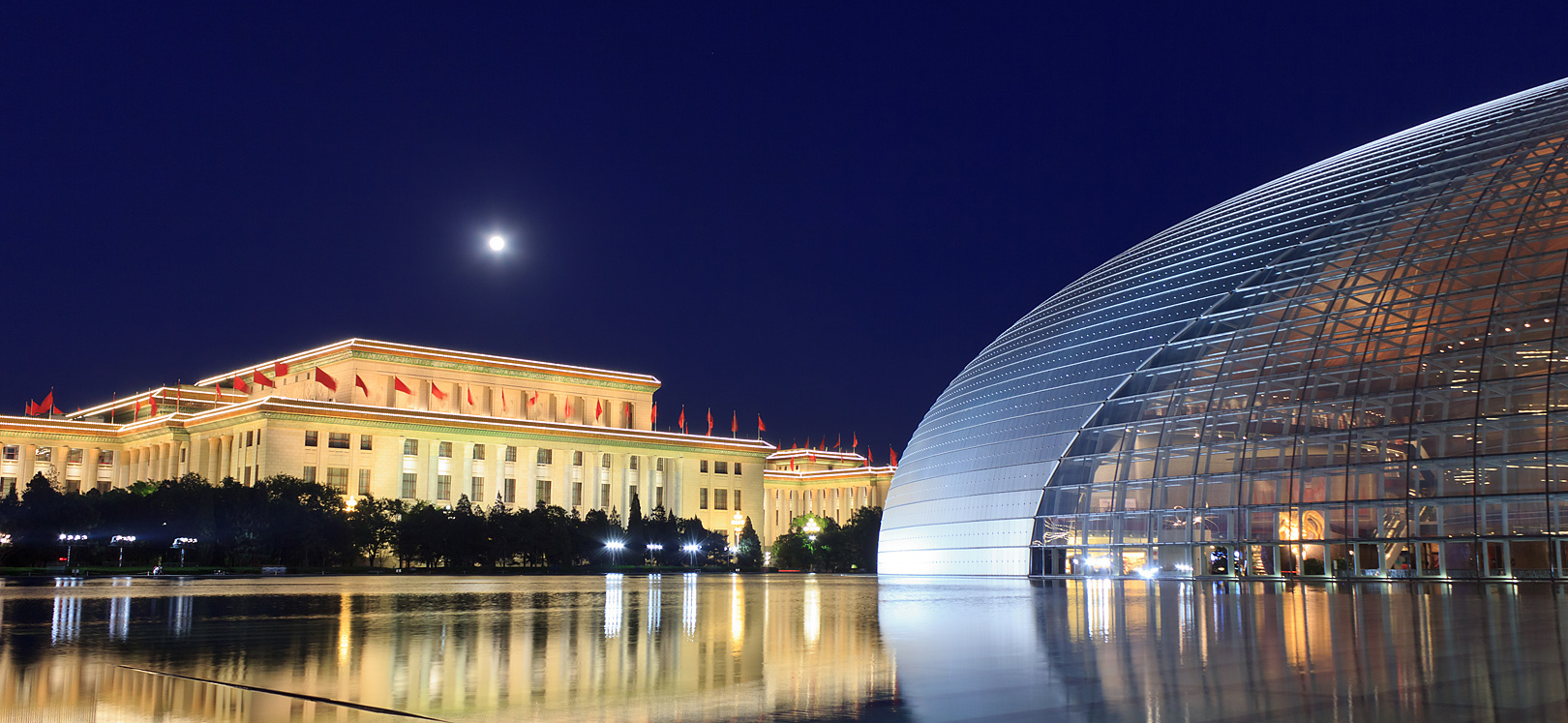
The National Centre for the Performing Arts and the Great Hall of the People

NCPA is located on the south side of Chang'an Street, in the heart of Beijing. According to the requirements of Beijing's overall planning, the height of the NCPA cannot exceed the height of the Great Hall of the People (46 meters), but the functional requirements of the NCPA exceed this, requiring underground development. The NCPA extends ten stories underground, making 60% of the building area underground. It is the most in-depth underground project of public buildings in Beijing. The deepest place is 32.5 meters, which is directly below the stage of the opera hall. 17 meters under the NCPA is the ancient river channel of the Yongding River in Beijing. The ground below the NCPA contains abundant groundwater. The buoyancy generated by this groundwater could support a giant aircraft carrier weighing 1 million tons. Such tremendous buoyancy is enough to hold up the entire theater. The traditional solution is to pump groundwater out continuously, but the result of pumping groundwater is that a 5-km-wide "groundwater funnel" will be formed underground near the theatre area, causing settlement of surrounding grounds, and even ground buildings may appear to crack. To solve this problem, engineers and technicians have conducted a detailed investigation and used concrete to pour an underground wall from the highest water level of the groundwater to the 60-meter underground clay layer. This vast "bucket" formed by subterranean concrete walls can enclose the foundation of the NCPA. The water pump draws the water out of the "bucket" so that no matter how much water is pumped in the foundation, the groundwater outside the "bucket" will not be affected, and the surrounding buildings will be safe.

The 6,750-ton steel beam frame made the largest dome. The structure of the NCPA is composed of a single curved steel beam. More than 18,000 pieces of titanium metal plate and more than 1,200 pieces of ultra-white transparent glass form a massive shell of 2,000 square meters. The world's largest dome is not supported by a pillar. The outer layer of the dome is coated with nano materials, and when the rain falls on the glass surface, it will not leave water stains. At the same time, nanotechnology also dramatically reduces the adhesion of dust.

To test the noise generated by raindrops falling on the domes with ten football fields, the scientists conducted repeated experiments. Experiments have shown that if effective noise prevention is not carried out, the sound in the entire dome will be like a drum when the rain falls. The anti-noise problem between theater to theater and theater to outside is solved by the use of a technique called "sound gate".

NCPA is surrounded by an artificial lake, and although the winter temperatures in Beijing sometimes fall below zero degrees Celsius, the lake does not freeze in the winter. It is achieved by the use of a closed circulation system, with constant temperature groundwater injected into the lake surface, so the water temperature of the artificial lake can be maintained above zero degrees in winter.

=== Location ===
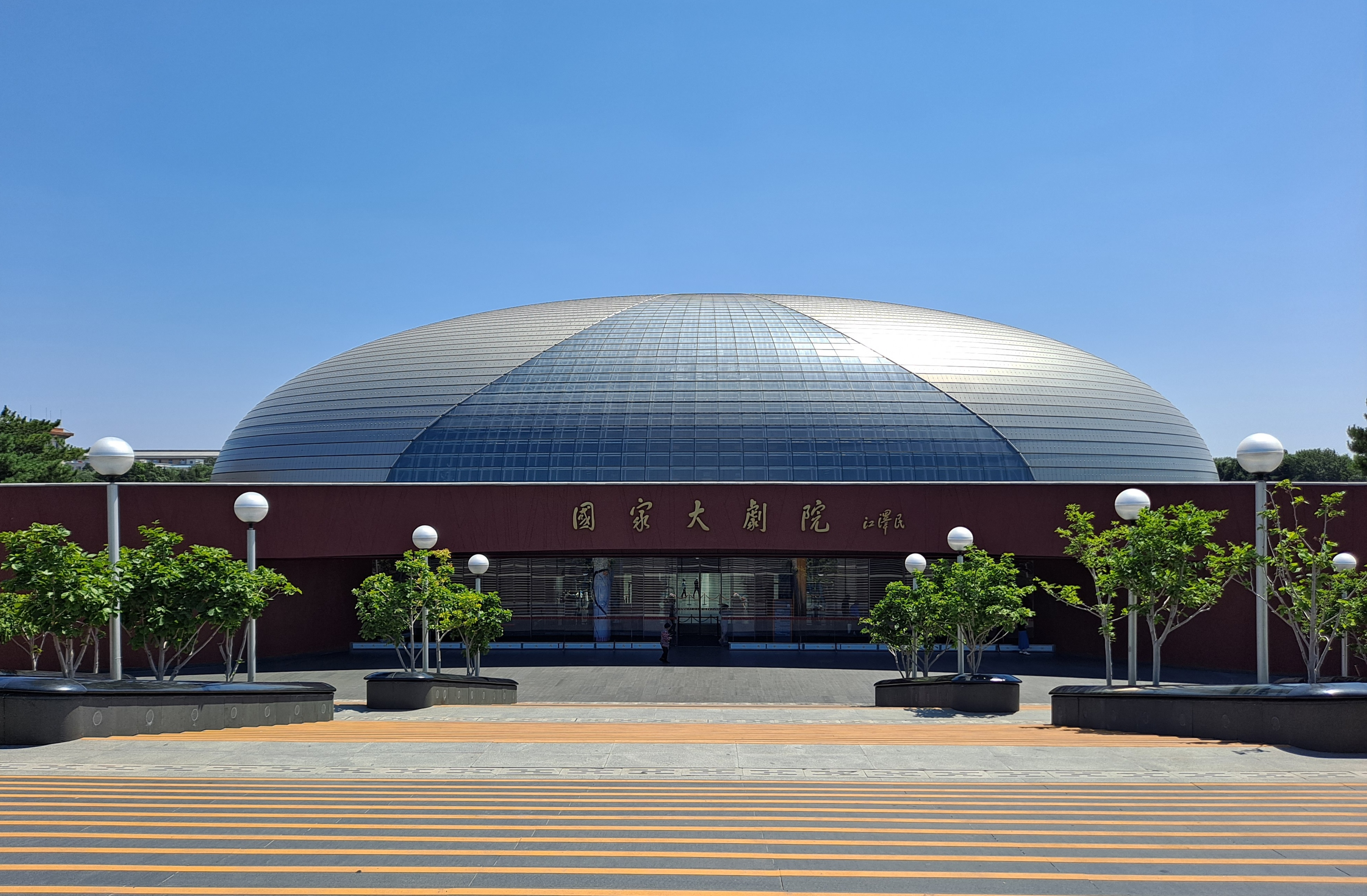
The north gate of the NCPA, which serves as the main entrance

The location, immediately to the west of Tiananmen Square and the Great Hall of the People, and near the Forbidden City, combined with the theatre's futuristic design, created considerable controversy. Paul Andreu countered that although there is indeed value in ancient traditional Chinese architecture, Beijing must also include modern architecture, as the capital of the country and an international city of great importance. His design, with large open space, water, and trees, was specially designed to complement the red walls of ancient buildings and the Great Hall of the People, in order to melt into the surroundings as opposed to standing out against them.

== Performance and other venues ==
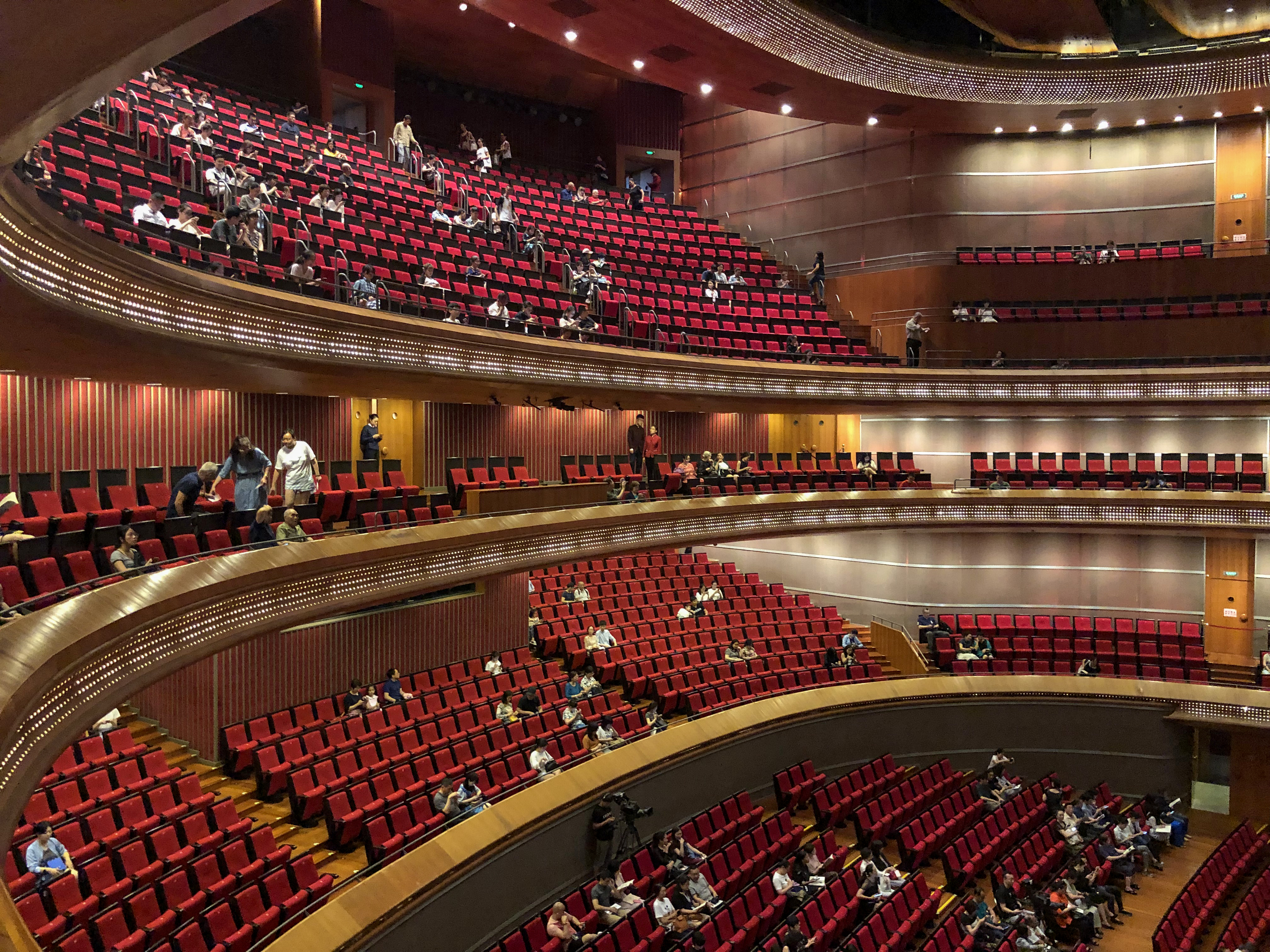
NCPA Opera House

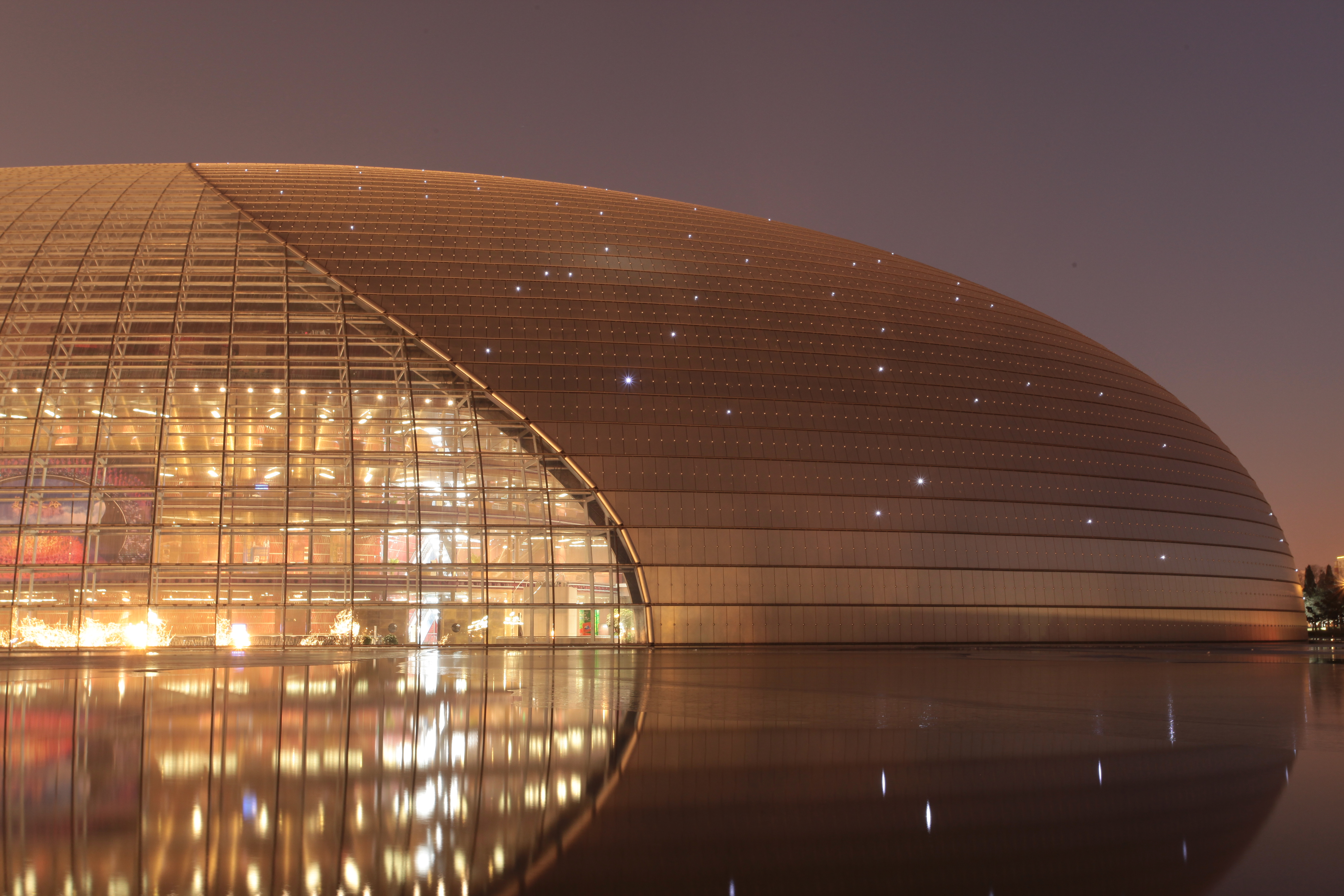
The NCPA at night

Internally, there are three major performance halls:

Opera Hall

The Opera Hall is a building in the NCPA, being coloured in gold colour. It is mainly staged for opera, dance, ballet, and large-scale performances, and featuring 2,207 seats. The auditorium of the Opera Hall has one floor of a performance pool and three floors of the auditorium. The Opera Hall features a stage with push, pull, ascending, descending and turning functions, a tiltable ballet table and an elevating pool capable of accommodating up to three bands.

Music Hall

The music hall is suitable for playing massive symphonies, folk music, and can hold various concerts with 1859 seats (including stand seats). The music hall has the largest organ in the country, which can meet the needs of multiple genres of works.

Theatre Hall

The theater is the most national theater of the NCPA, with Chinese red as the primary colour. It is mainly staged for dramas, operas, local operas, and other performances. The auditorium has one performance pool and three floors of the auditorium with a total of 1,036 seats (including stand seats).

The NCPA also distributes filmed and recorded performances of its concerts, plays and operas through the in-house label NCPA Classics, established in 2016.

== Cost ==
The initial planned cost of the theatre was 2.688 billion yuan. When the construction had completed, the total cost rose to more than CNY3 billion. The major cause of the cost increase was a delay for reevaluation and subsequent minor changes as a precaution after a Paris airport terminal building collapsed. The cost has been a major source of controversy because many believed that it is nearly impossible to recover the investment. When the cost is averaged out, each seat is worth about half a million CNY. The Chinese government answered that the theater is not a for profit venture.

The government sanctioned study completed in 2004 by the Research Academy of Economic & Social Development of the Dongbei University of Finance and Economics, of the upkeep costs of the building were publicized in domestic Chinese media:

The water and electricity bills and the cleaning cost for the external surface would be at least tens of millions CNY, and with another maintenance cost, the total could easily exceed one billion CNY. Therefore, at least 80 percent of the annual operational costs must be subsidized by the government for at least the first three years after the opening, and for the rest of its operational life, at least 60 percent of the annual operational cost must be subsidized by the government.

The director of the art committee of the National Centre for the Performing Arts and the standing committee member of the Standing Committee of the Chinese People's Political Consultative Conference, Wu Zuqiang (吴祖强), and the publicist/deputy director of the National Centre for the Performing Arts, Deng Yijiang (邓一江), have announced that 70 percent of the tickets would be sold at low price for ordinary citizens, while 10% of the tickets would be sold at relatively expensive prices for separate market segments, and the 60% of annual operating cost needed to be subsidized by the government would be divided between the central government and the Beijing municipal government.

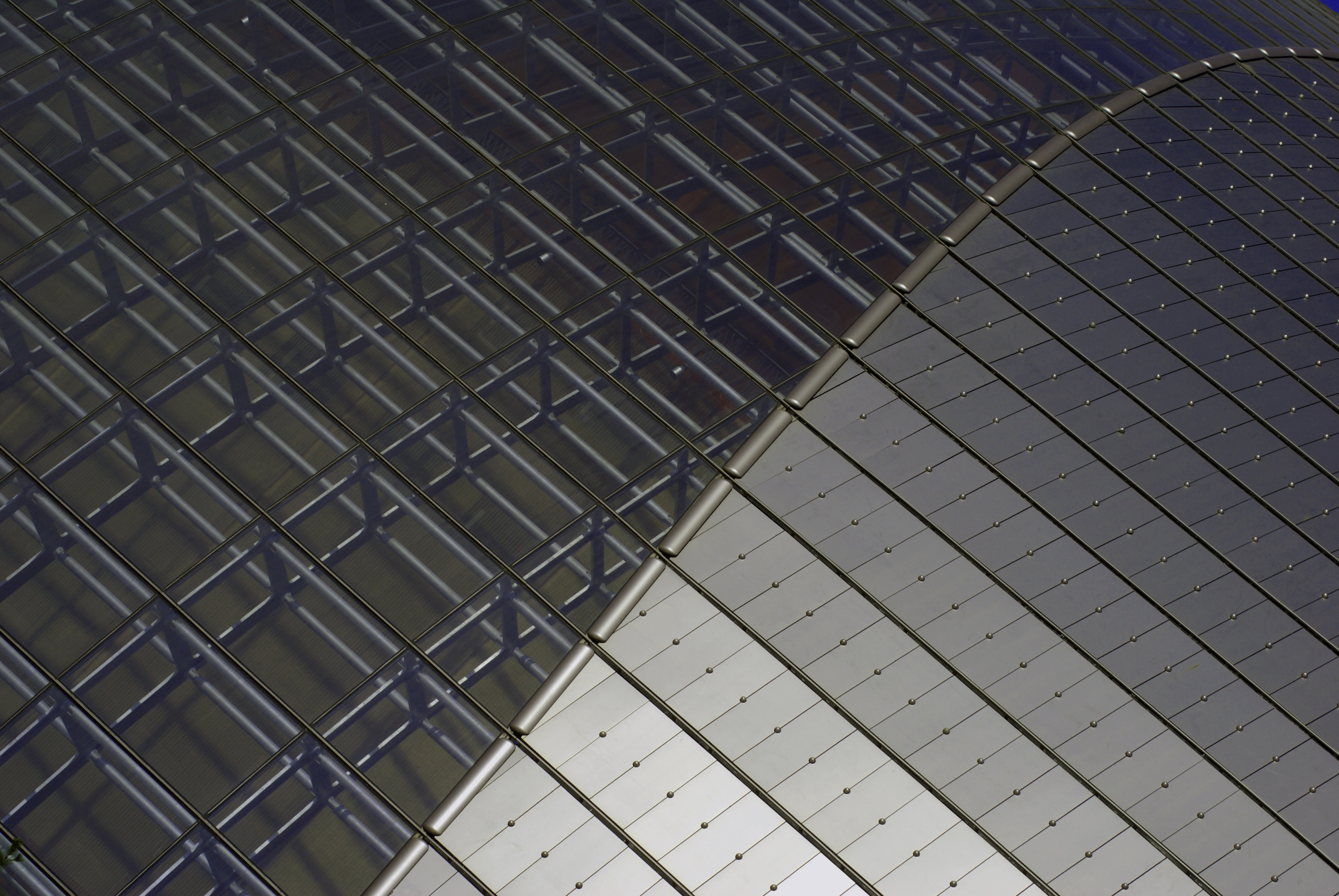
Building detail: transition from glass to titanium.

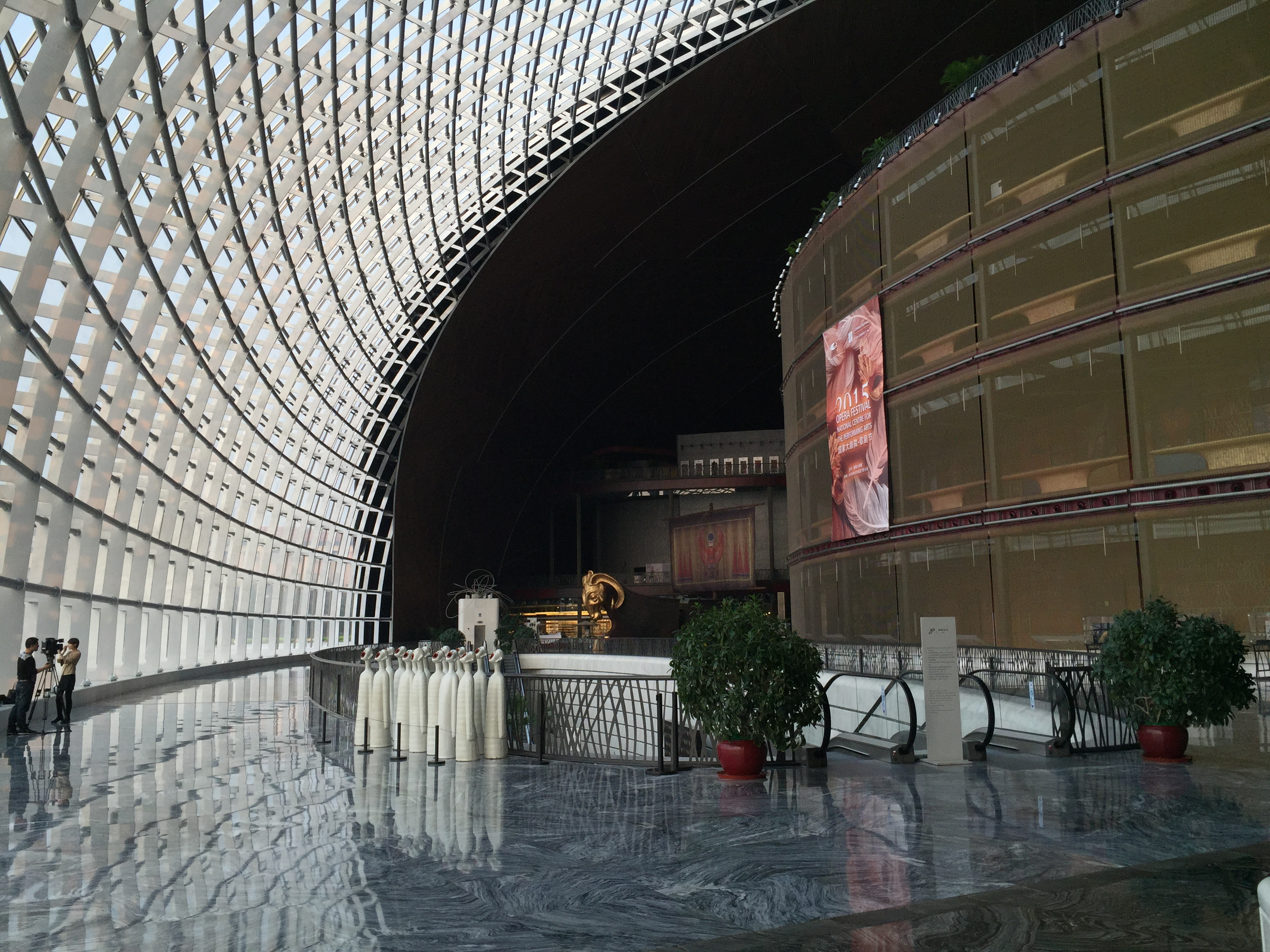
Inside the theater

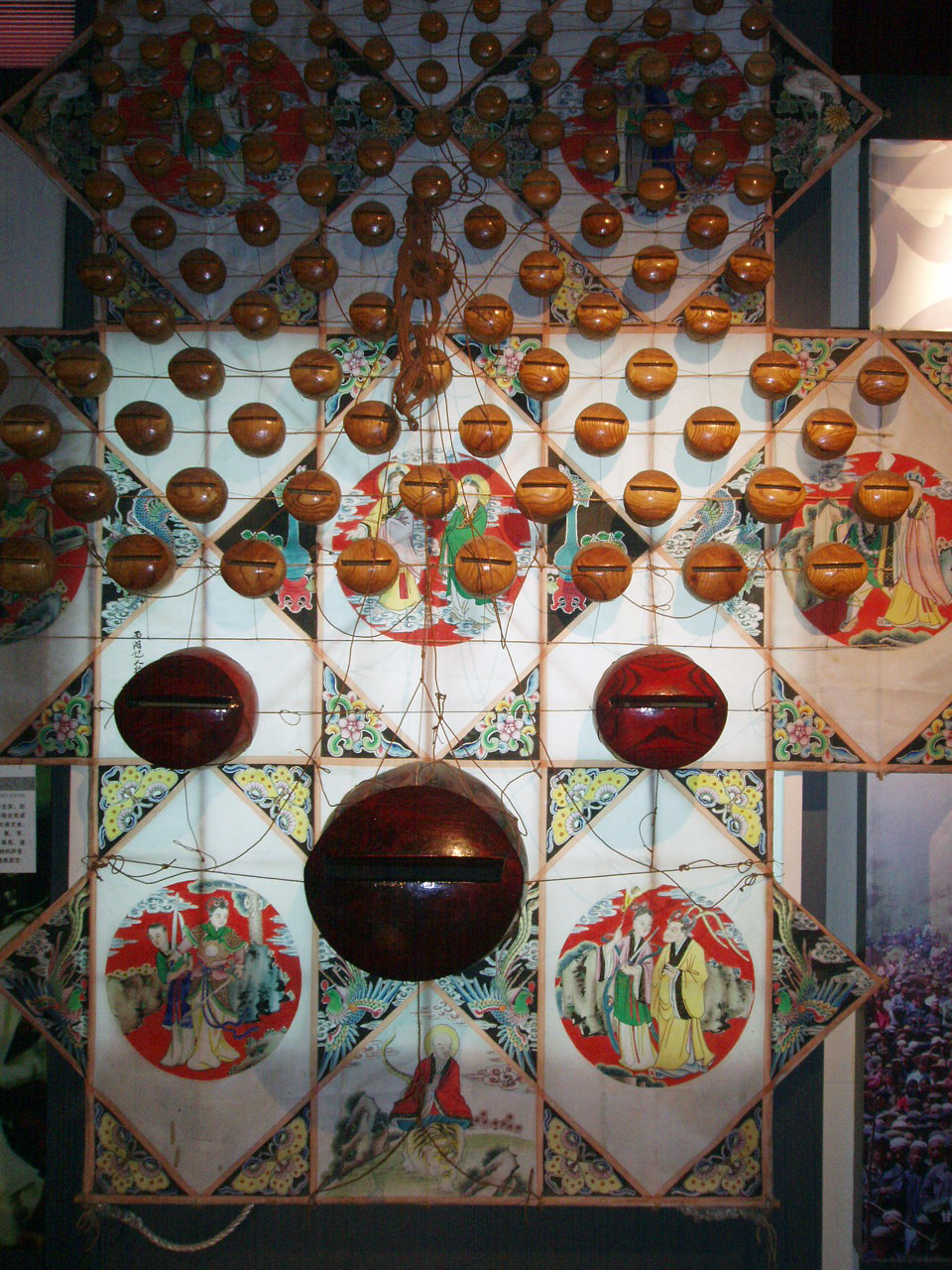
Inside decoration

== See also ==
- China National Center for the Performing Arts Orchestra
- China National Opera, the performing company
- List of concert halls
