= Chang hen ge =

- Traditional Chinese: 長恨歌
- Simplified Chinese: 长恨歌
- Literal meaning: Song of Everlasting Sorrow
Transcriptions
Standard Mandarin
- Hanyu Pinyin: Cháng hèn gē

Chang hen ge may refer to:

- Chang hen ge (poem), an 809 Chinese poem by Bai Juyi about the love and death of Yang Yuhuan
- The Song of Everlasting Sorrow (novel), a 1995 Chinese novel by Wang Anyi, about a Shanghai woman's life in the 20th century
  - Everlasting Regret, a 2005 Hong Kong film based on Wang's novel
  - To Live to Love, a 2006 Chinese TV series based on Wang's novel
