= Lapse =

Lapse or lapsed may refer to:

- Lapse, a social media platform
- Lapse and anti-lapse, in the law of wills
- Lapse rate, the rate that atmospheric pressure decreases with altitude
- Doctrine of lapse, an annexationist policy in British India
- The Lapse, a defunct American indie rock band
- Relapse, a medical term used in addiction treatment
- Lapsed (album), a 1997 album by Bardo Pond
- Lapsed power, a constitutionally granted power no longer in use
- Lapsed Catholic, a term for baptized Catholics who no longer practice
- Lapse (film), a 2023 Brazilian short film

== See also ==
- Relapse (disambiguation)
- Time lapse (disambiguation)
- Lapse of Time, a 1982 Chinese novella by Wang Anyi
- Lapsed listener problem, a problem in object-oriented programming
- "Mere lapsed", a 1998 Estonian Eurovision song
- Lapseki, a town in Turkey
- lapse function in ADM formalism of General Relativity
