= Chang Hen Ge (poem) =

Poem by Bai Juyi

Chang Hen Ge (Chinese: 長恨歌; lit. 'Song of Everlasting Regret') is a Chinese long poem written by the Tang poet Bai Juyi (772–846) in AD 806. It tells the story of the tragic love between Emperor Xuanzong of Tang and his favorite consort Yang Guifei (719–756).

== Influence ==
A long list of literary, political, visual, musical and film works have been based on or have referenced Chang Hen Ge. Immediately after the poem was written, its influence spread. Bai Juyi's friend Chen Hong (陳鴻, fl. 810s) created a dramatic version, Chang Hen Zhuan, which later inspired Rain on the Paulownia Tree (Wutong Yu) by Bai Pu (1226–after 1306) and The Palace of Eternal Youth (Changsheng Dian) by Hong Sheng (洪昇, 1645–1704).

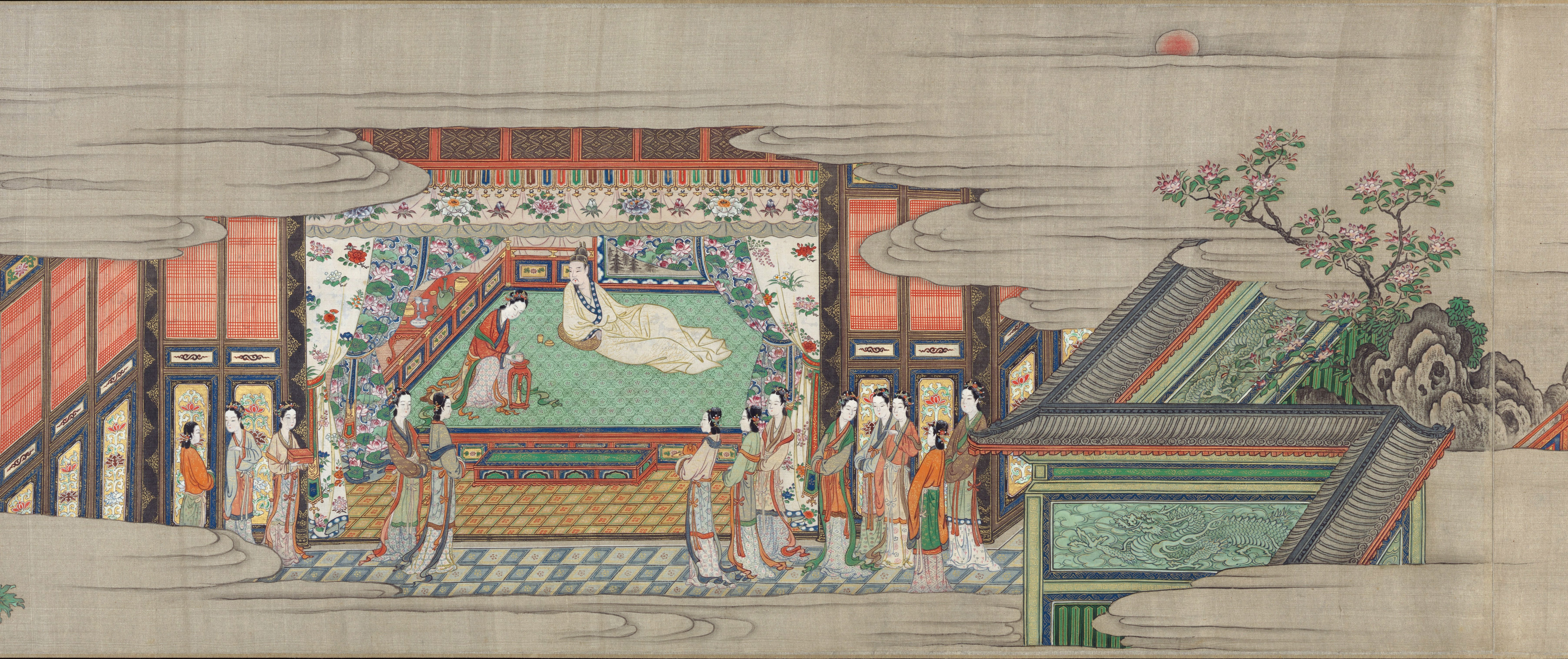
Scene from the Chang Hen Ge, depicting Emperor Xuanzong (center) and his concubines. Japanese painting by Kanō Sansetsu (1590–1651).

Painter Li Yishi (李毅士, 1886–1942) illustrated the poem with a series of thirty paintings. In classical music the poem has been set as a cantata by Huang Zi (1933) and as an orchestral song by Mo Fan (1991). The poem is referenced in the writings of Mao Zedong.

Author Madeleine Thien quotes from the poem in the closing pages of her award-winning 2016 novel, Do Not Say We Have Nothing.

Wang Anyi's 1995 novel The Song of Everlasting Regret shares the same title as the poem (長恨歌) but tells a story about a woman's turbulent life in 20th-century Shanghai. It was adapted into the 2005 Hong Kong film Everlasting Regret.

The poem is central to the plot of Legend of the Demon Cat. In this 2017 historical fantasy film directed by Chen Kaige, poet Bai Juyi is solving a murder case together with monk Kūkai. Throughout the film, Bai Juyi is struggling to finish his poem about the legendary beauty of Yang Guifei, without realizing that the murder case is also related to her death, a generation ago.

It had a great influence on Japanese literature during the Heian period, including Genji Monogatari.

== Interpretation ==
The poem might look like it retells the love story between Emperor Xuanzong of Tang and his favorite concubine Yang Guifei. But actually the poem reveals Bai Juyi's disappointment towards the Tang Government at that time. According to The Notes of Song of Everlasting Regret by Zhou Tian, the poem's opening section was sarcastic about Tang Xuanzhong's excesses due to his passion for Concubine Yang and his disregard for his royal duties. However, the poem's second section concentrates on the romantic tale of the two lovers. Zhou Tian believed that Bai Juyi was using this part to show that Concubine Yang was alluring and accountable for the Tang dynasty's downfall in life and death.
