= My Depression =

My Depression may refer to:

- My Depression: A Picture Book, a 2005 picture book by Elizabeth Swados
- My Depression (The Up and Down and Up of It), a 2014 animated short film based on Swados' book
