= The Zhang Family's Daughter-in-Law =

- Film poster
- Traditional Chinese: 張家少奶奶
- Simplified Chinese: 张家少奶奶
- Hanyu Pinyin: Zhāng Jiā Shào Nǎinǎi
- Directed by: Ye Ming
- Screenplay by: Ye Ming
- Based on: Lapse of Time by Wang Anyi
- Produced by: Shen Rumei
- Starring: Li Lan; Lü Liping; Wang Weiping; Meng Qian; Bai Mu
- Cinematography: Zha Xiangkang
- Edited by: Chu Jinshun
- Music by: Yang Mao
- Production company: Shanghai Film Studio
- Release date: 1985
- Running time: 91 minutes
- Country: China
- Language: Mandarin

The Zhang Family's Daughter-in-Law is a 1985 Chinese drama film directed by Ye Ming, based on Wang Anyi's award-winning 1982 novella Lapse of Time.

== Cast and characters ==
For whatever reason, the heroine's name was changed from Ouyang Duanli in the novel to Ouyang Ruili.

- Li Lan as Ouyang Ruili
- Wang Weiping as Zhang Wenyao
- Sun Jian as Zhang Wenguang
- Lü Liping as Zhang Wenying
- Meng Qian as Ouyang's mother-in-law
- Bai Mu as Ouyang's father-in-law
- Zeng Hui as Duoduo
  - Zhang Qi as Duoduo (older)
- Lu Yi as Lailai
  - Yang Yidi as Lailai (adult)
- Wei Ding as Mimi
  - Shao Lingli as Mimi (adult)
- He Jiehao as Qingqing
- Liu Guiqin
- Tang Guoguang
- Li Jianfei
- Chen Weiguo
- Ye Meng
- Yang Huichun
