= Relapse (disambiguation) =

A relapse is a recurrence of a past (typically medical) condition. It may also refer to:

- Relapse Records, a record label
- Relapse (Eminem album), a 2009 album by Eminem
- Relapse (Ministry album), a 2012 music album by Ministry
- Relapse (Warren Zeiders album), a 2024 album by Warren Zeiders
- Relapse (EP), a 2002 EP by Oceansize
- The Relapse, a 1696 play by John Vanbrugh
- "Relapse", a song by Lily Allen from the 2025 album West End Girl

== See also ==
- Lapse (disambiguation)
- Time lapse (disambiguation)
