= Bruce Hlibok =

American actor

Bruce Michael Mackintosh Hlibok (July 31, 1960 - June 23, 1995) was an American deaf actor.

== Early life ==
Hlibok was born on July 31st, 1960, in Flushing, New York to deaf parents, Albert and Margaret Hlibok, and was the eldest of four siblings. He directed his first formal play at Union League of Deaf in 1978, was a member of Metro Jr. NAD and attended Youth Leadership Camp. He attended Lexington School for the Deaf briefly then graduated from Horace Mann School, Riverdale, New York in 1979. He went to Gallaudet College and then transferred to New York University, where he graduated in journalism and play writing.

== Career ==
Hlibok was the first deaf actor to play a main role in a Broadway production, Runaways, composed and directed by Elizabeth Swados and produced by Joseph Papp. The musical premiered off-Broadway on February 21, 1978, at the Public Theater Cabaret as presented by the New York Shakespeare Festival. It moved to Broadway at the Plymouth Theatre on May 13, 1978, and closed on Dec 31, 1978 after 274 performances and 12 previews. Hlibok was the first to use sign language in the rhythm of music on stage. The play received five Tony Awards nominations.

Hlibok founded a theater company, Handstone Productions and authored a children book about his sister, Nancy, attending the Juilliard School of Dance, titled, Silent Dancer in 1981. He also served as a consultant for theaters for the deaf and on ASL in general theater.

Hlibok completed twelve written plays which were then produced at off-off Broadway theatres in Manhattan, New York; Paris, France; and Amsterdam, Netherlands. He staged a one-man show, The Deaf-Mute Howls, based on Albert V. Ballin's memoir. He acted in an off Broadway play, "Another Person is a Foreign Country", and his last role was in an off Broadway play, The Heart is a Lonely Hunter in 1994. He also was known for his poetry in both American Sign Language and English.

== Personal life and death ==
Hlibok lived in New York nearly all his life, starting with Flushing, Queens, then he moved to Manhattan for a while before settling in Jersey City, New Jersey. His long-term partner, Neal Johnson, who was a creative artist for Avon Products, died in 1987.{{cn{}}

On June 23, 1995, Hlibok died at the age of 34 from pneumonia, a complication caused by AIDS. His family created an endowment in his memory at Gallaudet University which created an annual playwriting competition, The Bruce Hlibok Playwriting Competition, and a library of resources at the Elstad Theatre on campus.
