= Thunderstorm (play) =

1933 play by Cao Yu

Thunderstorm (Chinese: 雷雨; pinyin: Léiyǔ; Wade–Giles: Lei^{2}-yü^{3}) is a play written in 1933 by the Chinese dramatist Cao Yu. It is one of the most popular Chinese dramatic works of the period prior to the Japanese invasion of China in 1937.

== History ==
The drama Thunderstorm was first published in the literary magazine, Literary Quarterly. Shortly after its publication, a production of the play was mounted in Jinan, and later, in 1935, in Shanghai and in Tokyo, both of which were well received. In 1936, Thunderstorm debuted in Nanjing, with Cao Yu himself acting in the lead role.

== Plot ==
The subject matter of Thunderstorm is the disastrous effects of rigid traditionalism and hypocrisy on the wealthy, modern, somewhat Westernized Zhou family. Specifically, the plot of Thunderstorm centers on the Zhou family's psychological and physical destruction as a result of incest and oppression, caused by its morally depraved and corrupt patriarch, Zhou Puyuan, a wealthy businessman.

The following synopsis is based on the complete version of the play (the prologue and epilogue are usually omitted from performances):

Prologue

Two children stumble into the former Zhou mansion, now a hospital operated by Catholic nuns. The hospital is inhabited by two mentally disturbed patients, one a silent and morose old woman and another a younger, violently hysterical woman. An elderly man named "old Mr Zhou" visits them. Through the dialogue between the nurses, it is revealed that old Mr Zhou is the husband of the younger patient, that three people died in this house ten years before in a tragedy and as a result the house is rumoured to be haunted. Towards the end of the prologue the old woman walks to the window, and falls.

Act I

The scene goes back to the summer of 1925, when the tragedy happened at the Zhou mansion. Lu Gui and his daughter Sifeng, both servants of the Zhou household, are seen conversing in the drawing room. Lu Gui tells Sifeng about a secret affair between the old master's wife Fanyi and her stepson Zhou Ping. Sifeng is shocked to learn this because she and Zhou Ping are in a romantic relationship. Lu Gui also tells Sifeng that Fanyi invited her mother Mrs Lu to the house, possibly wishing to dismiss Sifeng for her involvement with Zhou Ping.

A cough is heard and Fanyi enters. She is described as a refined and physically fragile woman with a passionate and resolute spirit. She learns from Sifeng that the old master had just returned from the mine a few days ago. She also questions Sifeng about Zhou Ping, showing great concern about him and jealousy at Sifeng.

Zhou Chong, Fanyi's 17-year-old son returns from a game of tennis and excitedly tells Fanyi about his newfound love for Sifeng. He even wants to share his school allowance with her so she can attend school. Fanyi is shocked and unhappy to learn that her son had fallen for a low-class girl, but is happy to see her son's brave insistence to pursue love in spite of difficulty. Chong also tells Fanyi that Ping told him "he once loved a woman he should never have loved".

Zhou Ping enters the room. He shows extreme discomfort at the sight of Fanyi. Soon afterward Zhou Puyuan, the old master and mine owner, enters with an air of authority. He tells the family of a workers' strike at the mine and reacts angrily when Chong sympathizes with the workers. Puyuan commands Fanyi to drink a traditional Chinese medicine concoction that he had ordered for her to cure her "mental imbalance". When Fanyi refuses, he becomes furious and orders Zhou Ping and Zhou Chong to kneel down and beg her to drink it. Eventually Fanyi relents, gulps down the medicine and leaves the room crying.

After the other people have exited the room, Zhou Puyuan reproaches Zhou Ping for "behaving dishonourably". Zhou Ping is petrified as he assumes Puyuan is referring to his affairs with women in the household. To his surprise Puyuan merely expresses disapproval at his habit of heavy drinking and going to dance halls. Puyuan reminisces about a woman named Shiping, whose photograph he displays in the drawing room. In Puyuan's words, she is Zhou Ping's birth mother who supposedly died many years ago.

Act II

In the afternoon, Zhou Ping secretly meets Sifeng in the drawing room and tells her of his plans to leave his home permanently to work at his father's business in the country. Sifeng begs him not to leave her behind. Ping assures her of his love for her but does not respond to her plea. Instead he arranges to meet Sifeng at her house that evening.

Fanyi enters after Sifeng has left and attempts to dissuade Ping from leaving the house and abandoning her. She tells him that she is unable to cope with Puyuan's abuse and expresses longing for Ping, and when Ping shows indifference, she angrily accuses both him and his father of hypocrisy and irresponsibility. Meanwhile, Ping expresses his regret for ever being involved with Fanyi and refuses to ever have anything to do with her again. The two end up in a heated argument and Ping leaves.

Sifeng's mother Mrs Lu, a kind and beautiful woman, arrives for her appointment with Fanyi. Mrs Lu recognises herself in the photograph, implying that she is Shiping, Zhou Ping's birth mother and Puyuan's ex-wife. She does not communicate this information to Sifeng. In their meeting, Fanyi tells Mrs Lu that Zhou Chong is in love with Sifeng, and urges her to take Sifeng home to avoid potential scandal. Mrs Lu agrees to this request.

Puyuan advises Fanyi that a physician has arrived to see Fanyi at his request. After she storms off in anger, he engages in conversation with Mrs Lu. After learning that she used to live in Wuxi, where he lived in his youth, he asks her if she knew where Shiping's grave is. Mrs Lu calmly tells him that although Shiping attempted suicide after being driven out of the Zhou family and leaving her first child (Zhou Ping) behind, she survived, gave birth to her and Puyuan's second son soon afterwards and married a poor man, who later became the father of her daughter. Eventually she reveals to Zhou Puyuan that she is indeed Shiping, who used to be a servant at the Zhou household where she had a relationship with Puyuan. Puyuan offers her money to atone for his sins, but she refuses and says she had decided to leave the city with her husband and daughter. Puyuan also learns from Shiping that their second son Lu Dahai is now working at his mine and is a leader in the workers' protests.

Lu Dahai, not knowing that Puyuan is his father, arrives at the Zhou house and confronts Puyuan over his exploitation of workers. Puyuan tells him that all other representatives have agreed to call off the strike and that everyone has gone back to work except him. Lu Dahai is furious and insults Puyuan but is punched by Zhou Ping and pushed away by the servants. Mrs Lu exits with Dahai.

Both Sifeng and Lu Gui are dismissed from the Zhou household. Fanyi learns of Ping's plan to visit Sifeng at her house and asks him not to go, saying that Sifeng is a lower-class woman not worthy of him. She ominously tells him that "A thunderstorm is coming", hinting at her plans for revenge.

Act III

The scene opens at Sifeng's house that evening, where Lu Gui unfairly accuses Dahai of causing his and Sifeng's dismissal and a brief family argument ensues. After Dahai and Mrs Lu leave, Lu Gui attempts to dissuade Sifeng from leaving the city with her mother.

A knock is heard and Zhou Chong arrives to visit Sifeng. He apologizes for what happened that afternoon and offers one hundred dollars to Lu Gui as compensation. He tells Sifeng that although she turned down his proposal of marriage, he still wants to be friends with her and would like to use his allowance to pay for her schooling. He also tells her about his dream of a world where there is no conflict and everyone is equal.

Lu Dahai returns and mistakenly thinks Chong is here to seduce Sifeng. Still angry over the events of the afternoon, he threatens Chong to never visit them again or he will break Chong's leg. Chong naively tries to explain his sympathy for the lower classes and offers to shake hands with Dahai. Eventually he gives up and returns to the Zhou mansion, his illusions half-shattered.

Mrs Lu also mistakenly assumes that Sifeng and Chong are in love. Thinking of her own early experience with Puyuan, she warns Sifeng to stay away from the men of the Zhou family, not realising that Sifeng is already in a relationship with Ping, her half-brother.

It is now midnight and Zhou Ping climbs through the window to visit Sifeng in her room. The lovers embrace. Fanyi's face appears briefly at the window. They are interrupted when Dahai enters the room to find bed planks. Mrs Lu begs Dahai not to hurt Ping. Zhou Ping escapes and Sifeng runs off in shame. Concerned about her safety, the family goes after her in the rain.

Act IV

It is 2am at the Zhou's living room, where Puyuan is reading over his work documents alone. Chong enters searching for his mother. Puyuan attempts to repair his relationship with Chong by talking to him, but Chong draws away in discomfort. Fanyi enters from the rain and acts coldly towards Puyuan. She even mocks him when he tells her to go to her room.

Ping and Fanyi now find themselves alone in the drawing room after returning from the Lu's. In a disturbed state, Fanyi accuses Ping and his father of conspiring against her and driving her insane. Abandoning all restraint, she begs Ping to take her to the country, even if Sifeng comes with them. Although Ping appears to be overtaken by guilt, he refuses and storms out of the room. Fanyi calmly tears up Shiping's picture.

Lu Dahai arrives at the Zhou's house searching for Sifeng and encounters Ping. He accuses Ping of ruining his sister's life and threatens to shoot him. Ping professes his love for Sifeng and promises that he will return and marry her. Dahai backs off after remembering his mother's warning against harming the Zhou family, and gives his pistol to Zhou Ping.

Sifeng enters and is reunited with Ping, followed by Mrs Lu. Ping asks Sifeng to leave for the countryside with him immediately and she agrees. Mrs Lu, who is aware of their true status as half-siblings, does all she can to prevent them. Sifeng reveals that she is already pregnant with Zhou Ping's child. Seeing that nothing can be undone, Mrs Lu agrees under the condition that they flee as far as possible and never return.

As they are about to exit, Fanyi enters with Chong in a desperate attempt at revenge. She tells Chong of Sifeng's relationship with Ping, hoping to inspire jealousy between the brothers. To her surprise Chong says that he is not really in love with Sifeng after all and wishes Sifeng a happy life with Ping. Having had her hopes shattered once more, Fanyi abandons all maternal sentiments and furiously tells everyone of her affair with Ping and his betrayal. Desperate, she calls for Puyuan to come and look at his son.

Puyuan enters and, unaware of the romance between Ping and Sifeng, reveals that Mrs Lu is indeed Ping's mother and Sifeng and Ping are half-siblings. A deadly silence follows. Unable to face the truth, Sifeng runs outside, followed by Chong. They are both electrocuted after running into a broken electric wire. As Puyuan, Fanyi and Mrs Lu try to comprehend the loss of their children, a gunshot is heard as Zhou Ping commits suicide.

Epilogue

Back in the hospital ten years later, old Mr Zhou (Puyuan) asks a nun about the old woman (Mrs Lu). He tells the nun that he had been searching for the old woman's son Lu Dahai for ten years with no result. He approaches the old woman and calls out her name, but she does not respond. He is disappointed and sits down, gazing at the fire.

== Characters ==
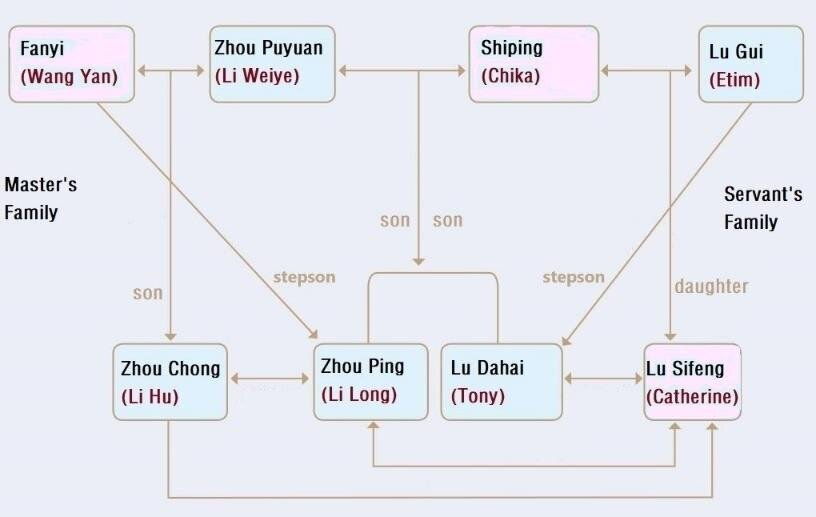
Character relationships in Thunderstorm. Blue for male and pink for female. (names indicated in parentheses are the equivalent characters in All for Catherine)

- Zhou Puyuan (traditional Chinese: 周樸園; simplified Chinese: 周朴园; pinyin: Zhōu Pǔyuán; Wade–Giles: Chou^{1} P'u^{3}-yüan^{2}): Chairman of the Board of a mining company, 55 years old.
- Fanyi (Chinese: 繁漪; pinyin: Fányī; Wade–Giles: Fan^{2}-i^{1}): Puyuan's second wife, 35 years old.
- Zhou Ping (周萍; Zhōu Píng; Chou^{1} P'ing^{2}): Puyuan's elder son (by Shiping), 28 years old.
- Zhou Chong (周沖; 周冲; Zhōu Chōng; Chou^{1} Ch'ung^{1}): Puyuan's youngest son (by Fanyi), 17 years old.
- Lu Gui (魯貴; 鲁贵; Lǔ Guì; Lu^{3} Kuei^{4}): manservant in the Zhou household, 48 years old.
- Lu Shiping (魯侍萍; 鲁侍萍; Lǔ Shìpíng; Lu^{3} Shih^{4}-p'ing^{2}): former wife of Puyuan and wife of Lu Gui, 47 years old.
- Lu Dahai (魯大海; 鲁大海; Lǔ Dàhǎi; Lu^{3} Ta^{4}-hai^{3}): son of Puyuan by Shiping, 27 years old.
- Lu Sifeng (魯四鳳; 鲁四凤; Lǔ Sìfèng; Lu^{3} Ssu^{4}-feng^{4}): maidservant in the Zhou household, daughter of Lu Gui and Shiping, 18 years old.

== Historical significance ==
Although it is undisputed that the prodigious reputation achieved by Thunderstorm was due in large part to its scandalous public airing of the topic of incest, and many people have pointed out not inconsiderable technical imperfections in its structure, Thunderstorm is nevertheless considered to be a milestone in China's modern theatrical ascendancy. Even those who have questioned the literary prowess of Cao Yu, for instance, the noted critic C. T. Hsia, admit that the popularization and consolidation of China's theatrical genre is fundamentally owed to the first works of Cao Yu. Thunderstorm is regarded as one of the most significant works of modern Chinese drama.

== Comparative perspective ==
Thunderstorm compares with other works of ancient and contemporary drama, particularly drama dealing with how the past haunts the present. In particular, Thunderstorm bears a strong resemblance in plot, themes, characterization, pacing and tone to the plays of Henrik Ibsen. Cao Yu was influenced by Western drama in many ways. He himself said that foreign drama writers had more influence on his creation, the first is Ibsen, second is Shakespeare, and there are Chekhov and O'Neill. He said he also paid "particular attention" to studying Ibsen's "structure, characters, character, climax". For instance, Thunderstorm shares with Ibsen's Ghosts elements such as a respected patriarch who has, in fact, impregnated his servant, a romance between his children (who do not know that they are half-siblings), and a climactic revelation of this situation in the play. More generally, the book relates to the genre of classical tragedy, particularly the Oedipus cycle and other plays of Sophocles.

== English translations ==
Thunderstorm was published in 1958 in an English translation by Wang Tso-liang and A.C. Barnes by Foreign Languages Press (Beijing). University Press of the Pacific published an English translation in 2001.

== Other adaptations and related works ==
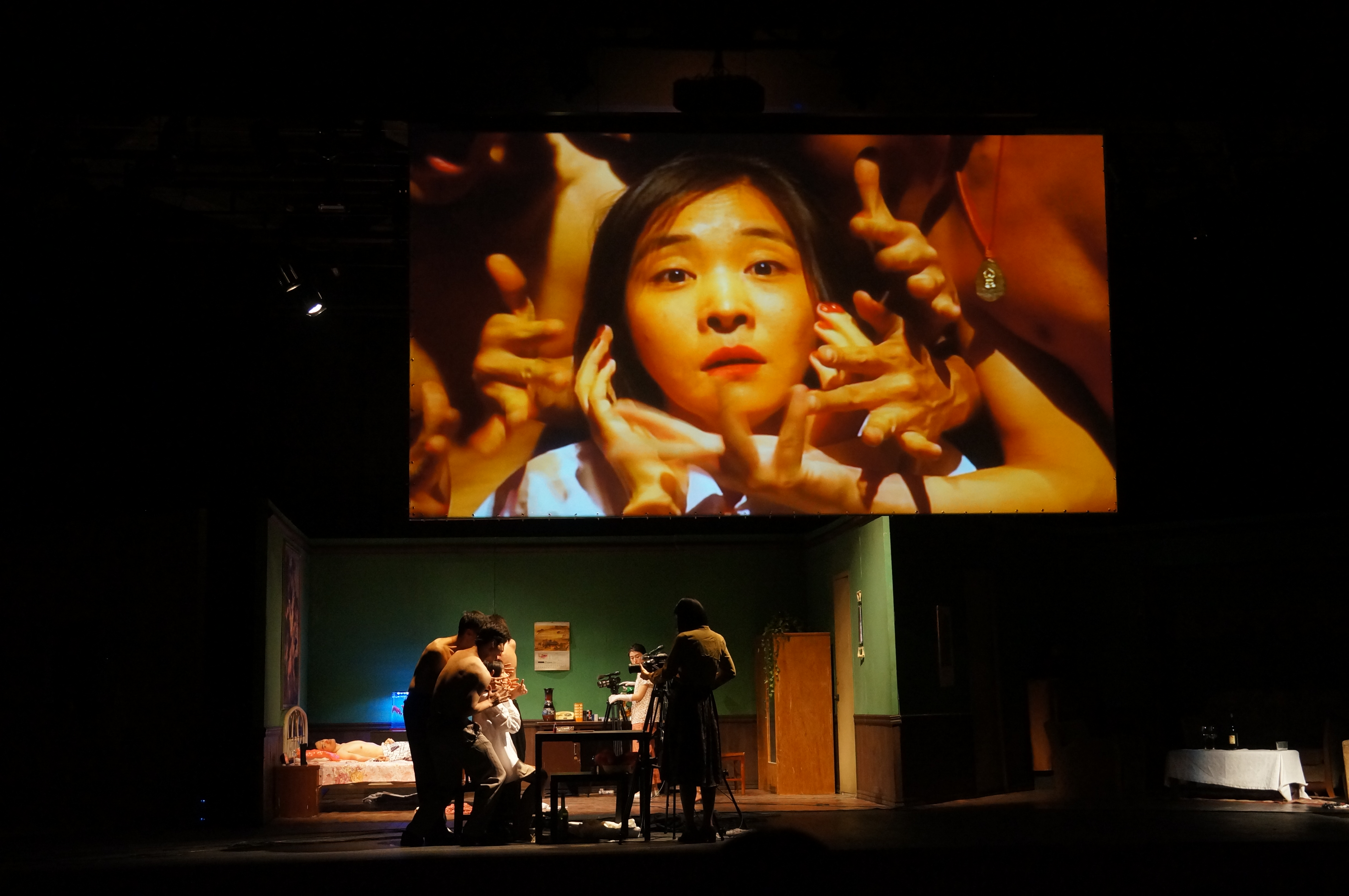
Thunderstorm 2.0, Jerusalem, 2016

In 1938, after the play's theatrical triumphs, a film version was produced in Shanghai. Another film version was made in Hong Kong in 1957 (Lei Yu, dir. Ng Wui), which co-starred a young Bruce Lee in one of his few non-fighting roles. In 1995, Director Ho Yi produced a Cantonese film version in, with the personal blessing of the playwright. This film was released in 1996.

Hangzhou-born composer Mo Fan composed a western-style opera based on the play, with the same title (Leiyu, "Thunderstorm"). The opera was presented in 2001 by the Shanghai Opera House company.

Another adaptation was the 2006 film Curse of the Golden Flower, directed and written by Zhang Yimou. This very loose adaptation set the action in the imperial court of the late Tang dynasty, with the Emperor in the place of Puyuan.

In 2012 Wang Chong directed Thunderstorm 2.0, a multimedia performance using four cameras and real-time editing, in Trojan House, Beijing. The adaptation, authorised by Cao Yu's family, cut 99% of the original text and only three major characters remained. The focus became Cao Yu's feminist view. The show was an immediate hit. The Beijing News noted it as one of the Best Ten Little Theater Works in China 1982–2012. It later toured Taipei Arts Festival, Israel Festival in Jerusalem, and Under the Radar Festival in New York, three festivals that no performance from mainland China has ever entered.

In Vietnam, Thế Anh and Thế Châu composed the Vietnamese opera adaptation of Thunderstorm in 1990. In 2019, THVL made a film adaptation called Tiếng sét trong mưa (Thunder in the rain).

Femi Osofisan created an adaptation called All for Catherine. In this version, one family is Chinese and the other family is Nigerian.

== Anthologies ==
It is included in The Columbia Anthology of Modern Chinese Drama, a 2010 book edited by Xiaomei Chen and published by the Columbia University Press. Kevin J. Wetmore Jr. of Loyola Marymount University stated that this inclusion was "I believe, for the first time" Thunderstorm was included in an anthology.
