= Convention (political norm) =

Uncodified traditions followed by the institutions of a state

A convention, also known as a constitutional convention, is an uncodified tradition that is followed by the institutions of a state. In some states, notably those Commonwealth states that follow the Westminster system and whose political systems derive from the constitution of the United Kingdom, some government functions are guided by constitutional convention rather than by a formal written constitution. In these states, actual distribution of power may be markedly different from those the formal constitutional documents describe. In particular, the formal constitution often confers wide discretionary powers on the head of state that, in practice, are used only on the advice of the head of government, and in some cases not at all.

Some constitutional conventions operate separately from or alongside written constitutions, such as in Canada since the country was formed with the enactment of the Constitution Act, 1867. In others, notably the United Kingdom, which lack a single overarching constitutional document, unwritten conventions are still of vital importance in understanding how the state functions. In most states, however, many old conventions have been replaced or superseded by laws (called codification).

Historical entities often had strong emphasis on constitutional convention. For example, the constitution of the Roman Republic was codified comparatively late in its development and relied for its functioning on traditions and a shared moral code called mos maiorum. In the Holy Roman Empire, such important issues as who could elect the emperor were entirely uncodified before the Golden Bull of 1356 and remained subject to a certain degree of interpretation well afterwards.

== Definitions ==
The term was first used by British legal scholar A. V. Dicey in his 1883 book, Introduction to the Study of the Law of the Constitution. Dicey wrote that in Britain, the actions of political actors and institutions are governed by two parallel and complementary sets of rules:

The one set of rules are in the strictest sense "laws", since they are rules which (whether written or unwritten, whether enacted by statute or derived from the mass of custom, tradition, or judge-made maxims know [sic?] as the common law) are enforced by the courts. ... The other set of rules consist of conventions, understandings, habits, or practices that—though they may regulate the conduct of the several members of the sovereign power, the Ministry, or other officials—are not really laws, since they are not enforced by the courts. This portion of constitutional law may, for the sake of distinction, be termed the "conventions of the constitution", or constitutional morality.

A century later, Canadian scholar Peter Hogg wrote:

Conventions are rules of the constitution which are not enforced by the law courts. Because they are not enforced by the law courts they are best regarded as non-legal rules, but because they do in fact regulate the working of the constitution they are an important concern of the constitutional lawyer. What conventions do is to prescribe the way in which legal powers shall be exercised. Some conventions have the effect of transferring effective power from the legal holder to another official or institution. Other conventions limit an apparently broad power, or even prescribe that a legal power shall not be exercised at all.

== Origins ==
Constitutional conventions arise when the exercise of a certain type of power, which is not prohibited by law, arouses such opposition that it becomes impossible, on future occasions, to engage in further exercises of this power. For example, the constitutional convention that the prime minister of the United Kingdom cannot remain in office without the support of a majority of members of the House of Commons is derived from an unsuccessful attempt by the ministry of Robert Peel to govern without the support of a majority in the House, in 1834–1835.

== Enforceability in the courts ==
Constitutional conventions are not, and cannot be, enforced by courts of law. The primary reason for this, according to the Supreme Court of Canada in its 1981 Patriation Reference, is that, "They are generally in conflict with the legal rules which they postulate and the courts may be bound to enforce the legal rules." More precisely, the conventions make certain acts, which would be permissible under a straightforward reading of the law, impermissible in practice. The court ruled that this conflict between convention and law means that no convention, no matter how well-established or universally accepted, can "crystallize" into law, unless the relevant parliament or legislature enacts a law or constitutional amendment codifying that convention. This principle is regarded as authoritative in a number of other jurisdictions, including the UK.

Some conventions evolve or change over time. For example, before 1918 the British Cabinet requested a parliamentary dissolution from the monarch, with the Prime Minister conveying the request. Between 1918 and 2011, Prime Ministers requested dissolutions on their own initiative, and were not required to consult members of the Cabinet (although, at the very least, it would have been unusual for the Cabinet not to be aware of the Prime Minister's intention). In 2024 Prime Minister Rishi Sunak reportedly announced his intention to hold an early election in July 2024 without even informing most of his cabinet prior to the announcement.

However, conventions are rarely ever broken. Unless there is general agreement on the breach, the person who breaches a convention is often heavily criticised, on occasions leading to a loss of respect or popular support.

== Examples ==
=== Australia ===
- Whoever can command a majority in the House of Representatives is entitled to be asked by the Governor-General to form a government, and take the title Prime Minister.
- Governors-General always act on the advice of their Prime Minister or other relevant minister in regard to particular powers they may exercise.
- An incumbent Prime Minister who loses an election will advise the Governor-General to appoint the leader of the larger party as Prime Minister so the Governor-General does not need to act alone.
- State Premiers tender advice to State Governors for Federal Senate elections, in response to the Prime Minister's advice to the Governor-General to call a Federal House of Representatives election.
- State Governors are given a dormant commission to administer the Commonwealth if the Governor-General is unable to.
- Vice-regal officers act in a politically neutral way.

No convention is absolute; all but one (the second) of the above conventions were disregarded in the leadup to or during the constitutional crisis of 1975.

Ignoring constitutional conventions does not always result in a crisis. After the 2010 Tasmanian state election, the governor of Tasmania rejected the advice of his premier to appoint the leader of the opposition as premier because he felt the advice was tendered in bad faith. The premier went on to form a new government.

=== Bosnia and Herzegovina ===
- The six members of the Constitutional Court of Bosnia and Herzegovina, that are chosen by the Parliaments of entities of Bosnia and Herzegovina, should be chosen in a way as to establish the national balance, of "constituent peoples", in the Court (two Bosniaks, two Croatians and two Serbs), although the Constitution does not have this requirement.
- The chairman of the Council of Ministers of Bosnia and Herzegovina should be of different nationality in every new term (establishing the "rotation"), although this is not formally regulated.
- The government of an entity should inform the government of Bosnia and Herzegovina of its intention to establish special parallel relationships with neighboring states, including negotiations. Also, the High Representative should be notified of any such intent, especially if there is a document that should be signed between parties, although the Constitution does not have this requirement (also for first example).

=== Canada ===
- The Prime Minister will request the Governor General to call an election upon the defeat of the government in a confidence or money vote. This convention was broken in 1968 when the ruling minority government of Lester B. Pearson unexpectedly lost a money vote. All the parties in Parliament, who were not prepared for a snap election, agreed to pass a resolution retroactively declaring the lost money vote was not a matter of confidence.
- Though it is mentioned in various constitutional documents, the precise nature of the office of the prime minister operates mostly according to understood, uncodified British conventions.
- The Supreme Court of Canada is, by statute (the Supreme Court Act), composed of three justices from Quebec and six from anywhere in Canada (including Quebec). This is because Quebec uses civil law rather than the common law system used elsewhere in Canada; it is necessary to have a panel of at least three judges to hear civil law cases. By convention, the remaining six positions are divided in the following manner: three from Ontario; two from the western provinces, typically one from British Columbia and one from the prairie provinces, which rotate amongst themselves (although Alberta is known to cause skips in the rotation); and one from the Atlantic provinces, almost always from Nova Scotia or New Brunswick. The appointment of the most senior puisne justice to chief justice is a convention that has recently fallen into disuse.

=== Chile ===
Under the 1925 Chilean Constitution, the president was elected by an absolute majority of the popular vote; if no candidate won an absolute majority, the National Congress would hold a contingent election between the top two candidates. A constitutional convention developed that Congress would always elect the candidate with the most popular votes at a contingent election. In a television interview ahead of the 1964 Chilean presidential election, presidential candidate (and eventual winner) Eduardo Frei Montalva upheld this convention. However, this convention was nearly broken in 1970, where the Socialist candidate Salvador Allende, a self-proclaimed Marxist, won the most votes; thus, the contingent election became a battleground between the two major powers of the Cold War, with the United States launching a campaign to prevent Allende's election by Congress while the Soviet Union gave its support to Allende. Although Allende was eventually elected at the contingent election, he was later overthrown by the military in 1973; under the military regime of Augusto Pinochet, which succeeded Allende, a new constitution was adopted in 1980, which replaced the contingent election with a runoff by popular vote, rendering the convention obsolete.

=== Commonwealth realms ===
- The Governor-General is appointed on the advice of the Prime Minister of the day, is a resident of the country he or she will represent, and can be dismissed immediately on the advice of the Prime Minister (exceptions are Papua New Guinea and the Solomon Islands, where the Governor-General is elected by Parliament and then formally appointed by the Monarch, and the United Kingdom, which has no vice-regal office). However, in Canada, provincial lieutenant-governors are appointed on the advice of the federal prime minister, not the provincial premier.
- Neither the Monarch nor a Governor-General will participate in the political process unless there is an extreme circumstance that merits the use of reserve powers, or when the advice tendered is contrary to established convention.
- Neither the Monarch nor a Governor-General will make partisan speeches or state partisan opinions. This convention was broken in 1975 by Sir Colin Hannah, the governor of Queensland, who called for the defeat of the Whitlam government. The Queen, on Whitlam's advice, revoked Hannah's dormant commission to act as Administrator of the Commonwealth of Australia and the Foreign and Commonwealth Office later refused the premier of Queensland's request that they advise the Queen to appoint Hannah to a second term as Governor (in 1975, Australian State Governors were still appointed on the advice of UK ministers).

=== Denmark ===
- The Danish Constitution makes reference to the King in great detail. Apart from the fact that this is understood to include a Queen regnant as well, references to the King acting in a political capacity are understood to mean the Prime Minister, as the Constitution stipulates that the King exercises his powers through the Cabinet.
- According to the Constitution, any public expenditure must be provided for in the annual money bill or provisional money bills. However, although not provided for in the Constitution, according to constitutional custom, the Parliamentary Budgetary Committee has the power to authorise provisional expenditure, regardless of the fact that such expenditure is not formally included in the budget (such grants are however then marked for adoption in the next forthcoming money bill).

=== France ===
- If the president of the National Assembly, the president of the Senate or 60 deputies or 60 senators claim that a just-passed statute is unconstitutional, the president of the republic does not sign the law and instead waits for a petition to be sent to the Constitutional Council.

=== Germany ===
- The German Basic Law does not provide for a formal mechanism of parliamentary self-dissolution. The chancellor can only be forced out of office through a constructive vote of no confidence, which simultaneously opposes the current chancellor and nominates a replacement. However, snap elections were held in 1972, 1983, 2005 and 2025 by the chancellor deliberately losing a vote of confidence and then asking the president to dissolve the Bundestag – a request which was granted in each case but was controversial in 2005.
- The president of Germany is not required to renounce his political affiliation, but since the founding of the Federal Republic in 1949 all presidents have let their party membership "rest" for the duration of their time in office. Joachim Gauck was not a member of any party even prior to taking office. This "resting" party membership was tacitly approved by the CDU/CSU and SPD for presidents who had been members or their parties even though their party rules and bylaws do not provide for such a mechanism.
- Similar to the provisions about monarchs in many parliamentary monarchies, the Basic Law formally grants the President powers to be exercised "on the advice of" Parliament or the government which are in practice never exercised by the President without clear direction from those bodies.
- The Basic Law only specifies how a chancellor is to be elected, not who is eligible. With one exception (Kurt Georg Kiesinger) all chancellors thus far have been members of the Bundestag, even though that is not a requirement for election or serving. Similarly the office of "candidate for chancellor" which is usually nominated by major parties (SPD and CDU/CSU but also FDP in 2002 and the Greens in 2021 and 2025) has no legal relevance and is not legally a precondition for being elected chancellor.
- Virtually all customs and informal rules regarding coalition agreements are based on convention rather than formal rules. Some are even in apparent conflict with the text of the constitution. The Koalitionsausschuss ("coalition committee") which was first acknowledged to exist during the First Erhard cabinet is a method of resolving potential conflicts within a governing coalition that has been criticized as "circumventing" parliament and the cabinet as means to discuss and resolve such issues.
- Elections to the Bundestag are usually held in autumn with over half (12 out of 21) of those to date held in September. Only the very first election in 1949 (held in August), the snap elections of 1972 (held in November), 1983 (held in March) and 2025 (held in February) and the election following German reunification held in December 1990 plus the election of 1987 (held in January) were held neither in September nor October.
- Laws passed by the Bundestag only enter into force once signed by the president. While this is usually only a formality, more than once the president refused to sign a law on constitutional grounds pending a review by the German Constitutional Court – this mechanism is based on precedent and custom more than the letter of the law, which allows the President to withhold their signature without any reason whatsoever.
- The president of the Bundestag is a member of the biggest faction, even if that faction is otherwise in opposition. This is one of few constitutional conventions already in place during the Weimar Republic and still followed today.

=== Lebanon ===
- The Lebanese constitution states that the president of Lebanon is elected by a simple majority of the Parliament of Lebanon. However, due to the country's delicate ethnic balance, the Parliament's various factions usually try to agree on a consensus candidate.
- Under the unwritten National Pact, the president must always be a Maronite Christian; the prime minister a Sunni Muslim; the speaker of Parliament a Shia Muslim; and the deputy speaker Greek Orthodox.

=== Malaysia ===
- At the federal level, the King acts on the prime minister's advice, except on certain cases. At the state level, the respective ruler or governor acts on his chief minister's advice.
- At the federal level, the prime minister is the leader of the party with an absolute majority of seats in the Dewan Rakyat (House of Representatives) and therefore most likely to command the support of the Dewan Rakyat; and likewise a Chief Minister, the leader of the party with an absolute majority of seats in a State Legislature and therefore most likely to command the support of such State Legislature.
- The prime minister should be a member of the Dewan Rakyat.
- The Speaker of the Dewan Rakyat chairs the Joint Session of Parliament, where the King addresses both Dewan Negara (Senate) and Dewan Rakyat.

=== New Zealand ===
New Zealand has constitutional conventions around individual ministerial responsibility, collective cabinet responsibility, caretaker governments, and that the monarch or governor-general only acts on the advice of ministers.

There is a convention that the Prime Minister of New Zealand should not ask for an early election unless they are unable to maintain confidence and supply. By the 1950s, it had also become a convention that elections should be held on the last Saturday of November, or as close as possible to it. These conventions have been breached several times, with an election being held several months earlier.

- 1951 general election: Sidney Holland called the election to get a mandate to face down a dock works dispute. The government was returned to power with an increased majority; by this time the dispute had been resolved.
- 1984 general election: Robert Muldoon's government held a narrow four-seat majority in Parliament. Muldoon hoped to strengthen his leadership, as two backbenchers (Marilyn Waring and Mike Minogue) were threatening to rebel against the government in an opposition-sponsored anti-nuclear bill, although they had not threatened to block confidence and supply. The election was a decisive defeat for the government.
- 2002 general election: Helen Clark called the election after the collapse of the Alliance, her coalition partners. Some critics argued that the government could still maintain confidence and supply and therefore the early election was not necessary. The Labour Party returned to power with different coalition partners.

=== Norway ===
Because of the 1814 written constitution's pivotal role in providing independence and establishing democracy in the 19th century, the Norwegian parliament has been very reluctant to change it. Few of the developments in the political system that have been taking place since then have been codified as amendments. This reluctance has been labelled constitutional conservatism. The two most important examples of constitutional conventions in the Norwegian political system are parliamentarism and the declining power of the King.

- Parliamentarism has evolved since 1884 and entails that the cabinet must maintain the support of parliament (an absence of mistrust) but it need not have its express support.
- All new laws are passed and all new cabinets are therefore formed in a de jure fashion by the King, although not necessarily in a de facto sense.
- According to the written constitution, the cabinet (council of ministers) are appointed by the King. The appointment of new cabinets by the King is a formality, and the king has not directly exercised executive powers since 1905.

=== Spain ===
Much of Spain's political framework is codified in the Spanish Constitution of 1978, which formalizes the relationship between an independent constitutional monarchy, the government, and the legislature. However, the constitution invests the monarch as the "arbitrator and moderator of the institutions" of government.

- The King nominates a candidate to stand for the Presidency of the Government of Spain, sometimes known in English as 'prime minister'. The nominee then stands before the Congress of Deputies and presents his political agenda for the upcoming legislative term, followed by a vote of confidence in the nominee and his agenda. The 1978 constitution allows the King to nominate anyone he sees fit to stand for the vote of confidence so long as the King has met with the political party leaders represented in the Congress beforehand. However, King Juan Carlos I consistently nominated the political party leader who commands a plurality of seats in the Congress of Deputies.
- The Spanish public perception that the monarchy be politically non-partisan in its adherence to constitutional protocol and convention, yet while protecting the public expression of personal political views by members of the royal family. Expressions of personal political views expressed in public include when the Prince of Asturias and his sisters protested against terrorism following the 2004 Madrid bombings, or when the Queen gave controversial political viewpoints during an informal interview.
- Constitutionally, the King appoints the twenty members to the General Council of the Judiciary. However, when a vacancy is observed the King's appointment has been customarily on the advice of the government of the day. Additionally, the King appoints the President of the Supreme Court on the advice of the General Council of the Judiciary.
- According to the 1978 constitution, honours and titles of nobility, and civil and military decorations, are awarded by the King as head of state. However, in most cases since 1978, the King's appointments of titles of nobility have been countersigned by the president of the Government of Spain, with civil awards having been nominated by the president and military awards having been nominated by the military.

=== Switzerland ===
The following constitutional conventions are part of the political culture of Switzerland. They hold true at the federal level and mostly so at the cantonal and communal level. Mostly, they aim to reconcile the democratic principle of majority rule with the need to achieve consensus in a nation that is much more heterogeneous in many respects than other nation-states. Historically this heterogeneity referred to confessional and ideological differences (liberal vs conservative, later with the third pole of social democratic/socialist parties) that erupted in the Sonderbundskrieg in 1847 but in the 20th and 21st century the linguistic and urban-rural divides have become increasingly important.

- The government is a body of equals composed in political proportion to the weight of the various factions in Parliament; this creates a permanent grand coalition. For most of the post-war era, the composition of the Federal Council was fixed by the so-called magic formula.
- Members of a collective body, including the federal government, observe collegiality at all times, that is, they do not publicly criticise one another. They also publicly support all decisions of the collective, even against their own opinion or that of their political party. In the eye of many observers, this convention has become rather strained at the federal level, at least after the 2003 elections to the Swiss Federal Council.
- The presidency of a collective body, particularly a government, rotates yearly; the president is a primus inter pares.

=== Taiwan (Republic of China) ===
Much of Taiwan's informal constitutional practices arise due to conflicts between the original 1947 Constitution, which was written to govern the entirety of China, and the current reality that the Republic of China governs only the Taiwan Area.

- According to the Additional Articles of the Constitution of the Republic of China, Taiwan is nominally a semi-presidential republic with the premier acting as the head of the Executive Yuan, while the president is responsible only for national security and other ceremonial issues. In practice, however, Taiwan functions more like a presidential republic, since the executive branch is led by the president with the premier serves under it without answering to the Legislative Yuan.
- One China stance is enshrined in both Article 4 of the original 1947 Consitution and the preamble of the Additional Articles. In practice, however, Taiwan no longer pursues its territorial claims over China due to lack of popular support.

=== United Kingdom ===
While the United Kingdom does not have a written constitution that is a single document, the collection of legal instruments that have developed into a body of law known as constitutional law has existed for hundreds of years.

As part of this uncodified British constitution, constitutional conventions play a key role. They are rules that are observed by the various constituted parts though they are not written in any document having legal authority; there are often underlying enforcing principles that are themselves not formal and codified. Nonetheless it is very unlikely that there would be a departure of such conventions without good reason, even if an underlying enforcing principle has been overtaken by history, as these conventions also acquire the force of custom. Examples include:

- The texts of most international treaties are laid before Parliament at least 21 days before ratification (the 'Ponsonby Rule' of 1924). This convention was codified by the Constitutional Reform and Governance Act 2010.
- The monarch will accept and act on the advice of their ministers, who are responsible to Parliament for that advice; the monarch does not ignore that advice, except when exercising reserve powers.
  - The principle that this advice must itself serve a legitimate purpose has been held to be a matter of law: Council of Civil Service Unions v Minister for the Civil Service.
  - The principle that the advice must not frustrate Parliament's role in holding the Prime Minister to account is also a matter of law: R (Miller) v The Prime Minister and Cherry v Advocate General for Scotland.
- The prime minister is leader of the party (or coalition of parties) with an absolute majority of seats in the House of Commons and therefore most likely to command the support of the House of Commons.
  - Where no party or coalition has an absolute majority, the leader of the party with the most seats in the Commons is given the first opportunity to seek to form a government. This convention was asserted by Nick Clegg, leader of the Liberal Democrat party, to justify seeking a coalition with the Conservatives instead of Labour (who additionally would not have been able to form a majority without other parties) in the hung parliament following the 2010 general election.
- All money bills must originate in the House of Commons.
- The monarch grants royal assent to all legislation – sometimes characterised as all legislation passed in good faith. It is possible that ministers could advise against giving consent, as happens with the Crown dependencies (convention since the early 18th century – previously monarchs did refuse or withhold royal assent).
- The Prime Minister should be a member of either House of Parliament (between the 18th century and 1963).
  - By 1963 this convention had evolved to the effect that no Prime Minister should come from the House of Lords, due to the Lords' lack of democratic legitimacy. When the last Prime Minister peer, the Earl of Home, took office he renounced his peerage, and as Sir Alec Douglas-Home became an MP.
  - The Prime Minister can hold office temporarily whilst not a Member of Parliament, for example during a general election or, in the case of Douglas-Home, between resigning from the Lords and being elected to the Commons in a by-election.
- All Cabinet members must be members of the Privy Council, since the cabinet is a committee of the council. Further, certain senior Loyal Opposition shadow cabinet members are also made Privy Counsellors, so that sensitive information may be shared with them "on Privy Council terms".
- The House of Lords should not reject a budget passed by the House of Commons. This was broken controversially in 1909 by the House of Lords, which argued that the Convention was linked to another Convention that the Commons would not introduce a Bill that 'attacked' peers and their wealth. The Lords claimed that the Commons broke this Convention in Chancellor of the Exchequer David Lloyd George's "People's Budget", justifying the Lords' rejection of the budget. The Commons disputed the existence of a linked convention. As a consequence, the Lords' powers over budgets were greatly lessened, including by removing their power to reject a bill, by the Parliament Act 1911.
- During a general election, no major party shall put up an opponent against a Speaker seeking re-election. This convention was not respected during the 1987 general election, when both the Labour Party and the Social Democratic Party fielded candidates against the formerly Conservative Speaker, Bernard Weatherill, who was MP for Croydon North East. The Scottish National Party (SNP) does stand against the Speaker who represents a Scottish constituency, as was the case with Michael Martin, Speaker from 2000 to 2009.
- The Westminster Parliament will only legislate with respect to Scotland or Wales on reserved matters. It will not legislate on non-reserved matters ('devolved matters') without first seeking the consent of the Scottish Parliament (since 1999, the Sewel convention, later renamed to legislative consent motions) or Senedd Cymru (since the Wales Act 2017).
- The House of Lords shall not oppose legislation from the House of Commons that was a part of the government's manifesto (the Salisbury convention).

=== United States ===
- The president of the United States will give his State of the Union address in person, before a joint session of Congress, and will do so every year except the first year of a new term (in which the President's inaugural address stands loosely in its stead). This practice was followed by George Washington and John Adams but abandoned by Thomas Jefferson and not resumed until 1913, when Woodrow Wilson delivered his State of the Union address in person. The constitution requires the President give an update on the state of the union "from time to time", but no specifics are outlined. Speeches have been broadcast on radio since 1923 and 1947; the last State of the Union message delivered only in writing was in 1981 by Jimmy Carter during his lame duck period.
- Much of how the United States Cabinet operates is dictated by convention; its operations are only vaguely alluded to in the US constitution.
- While members of the United States House of Representatives are only required to live in the state they represent, it has generally been expected that they live in the district they represent as well, though there are some exceptions; Allen West was elected in 2010 representing a district adjacent to the one he resided in.
- The president of the United States will obtain the consent of both Senators from a state before appointing a United States Attorney, federal district judge, or federal marshal with jurisdiction in that state.
- Cabinet officials and other major executive officers resign and are replaced when a new President takes office, unless explicitly asked to stay on by the new President.
- The Speaker of the House is always the representative who leads the majority party, even though the Constitution does not specify that the Speaker must be a member of the chamber. Also by custom the Speaker does not vote (except to break a tie).
- The President pro tempore of the United States Senate is the seniormost Senator of the majority party.
- Members of the Electoral College are pledged to vote for a particular presidential candidate, and are chosen by popular vote with the name of the candidate, and not necessarily the elector, on the ballot.
- Senate rules require a majority of 60 votes to invoke cloture, that is, to break off debate on a bill and force a vote. The Senate could revise its rules at any time, and the rules for each session of the House and Senate are typically set at the beginning of each elected Congress. In the Senate, under the current rules, the filibuster is available as a tool for a large-enough minority to indefinitely block any measure it finds objectionable.

== See also ==
- Lapsed power
- Gentleman's agreement
- Customary constitution

== Bibliography ==
- Brazier, R. (1992) Northern Ireland Legal Quarterly 43, 262
- Constitutional Practice. Oxford: Clarendon Press. 1994. p. 3. ISBN 0-19-876360-3.
- Mackintosh, J.P. (1977). The British Cabinet. Stevens & Sons. p. 13. ISBN 9780420446701.
- Donald Markwell (2016). Constitutional Conventions and the Headship of State: Australian Experience. Connor Court. p. 228.ISBN 9781925501155.
- Marshall, G. (1987). Constitutional Conventions: The Rules and Forms of Political Accountability. Oxford: Oxford University Press. ISBN 019876202X.
- Marshall, G.; Moodie, G.C. (1971). Some Problems of the Constitution. Hutchinson. pp. 22–3. ISBN 0-09-109941-2.
