= To Live to Love =

- North American DVD cover
- Traditional Chinese: 長恨歌
- Simplified Chinese: 长恨歌
- Literal meaning: The Song of Everlasting Sorrow
- Hanyu Pinyin: Cháng Hèn Gē
- Genre: period drama; romantic drama
- Based on: The Song of Everlasting Sorrow by Wang Anyi
- Written by: Jiang Liping; Zhao Yaomin
- Directed by: Ding Hei
- Starring: Maggie Cheung Ho-yee; Huang Yi; Tse Kwan-ho; Wu Hsing-kuo; Xu Zheng; Chen Lina; Gu Yan; Jin Meng
- Music by: Zhao Lin
- Opening theme: "Ruguo Meiyou Ni" (如果没有你) performed by Bai Guang
- Ending theme: "Wuxin Dengdai" (无心等待) performed by Janice Yan
- Country of origin: China
- Original language: Mandarin
- No. of episodes: 35

Production
- Executive producer: Ding Hei
- Producer: He Zizhuang
- Cinematography: Huang Wei; Wang Tianlin
- Running time: 45 minutes
- Production companies: Wenhui–Xinmin United Press Group; Shanghai Film Group Corporation; Hairun Movies & TV Production; Eastern Shanghai Culture, Movies & TV; Zuo'an Movies & TV Production

Original release
- Network: Shanghai Television
- Release: March 28, 2006

To Live to Love is a 2006 Chinese period TV drama series directed by Ding Hei, based on Wang Anyi's 1995 novel The Song of Everlasting Sorrow. The series stars Huang Yi and Maggie Cheung Ho-yee as the protagonist Wang Qiyao in different ages. It also stars Tse Kwan-ho (as Mr. Cheng), Wu Hsing-kuo (as Director Li), Xu Zheng (as Kang Mingxun), and Chen Lina (as Jiang Lili).

== Filming ==
Filming began in July 2004 in Soochow University, and moved to Shanghai, where the story is set, in August 2004. The series was first broadcast on March 28, 2006, on Shanghai Television.

== Cast and characters ==
Episodes 1-14 deal with the years 1947–1950. These episodes correspond to roughly Part I and Part II, Chapter 1 of the novel. Episodes 14–35 deal with the years from 1958 to 1979.

| Actor | Character | Notes |
Main cast
| Huang Yi (ep. 1–14) | Wang Qiyao | |
| Maggie Cheung Ho-yee (ep. 14–35) | Wang Qiyao | |
| Tse Kwan-ho | Cheng Shidi | "Mr. Cheng" |
| Chen Lina | Jiang Lili | |
| Gu Yan | Wang Qiyao's mother | died of illness in 1968 |
Episodes 1–14
| Ding Danni | Wu Peizhen | |
| Wei Li | Wang Jingtang | Wang Qiyao's father, died of illness in 1948 |
| Zhang Junwei | Wang Qiming (teenaged) | Wang Qiyao's younger brother |
| Xu Yulan | Mama Zheng | Wang family's maidservant |
| Liu Changwei | Mr. Xu | Wang Jingtang's colleague |
| Song Linlin | Captain Jason | captain of a European ship |
| Jiang Shizhuo | Fugui | Wu Peizhen's cousin |
| Qu Cheng | Yang Biao | film director |
| Yan Xiaopin | Jiang Lili's mother | |
| Li Ying | Su San | film actress, also Li Puzhi's mistress |
| Wu Hsing-kuo | Li Puzhi | "Director Li" |
| Liu Jie | Xiaoyanhong | Li Puzhi's wife, also sworn sister of Jiang Lili's mother |
| Liao Jinfeng | "eldest sworn sister" | sworn sisters of Xiaoyanhong and Jiang Lili's mother |
| Song Ruhui | "second sworn sister" | sworn sisters of Xiaoyanhong and Jiang Lili's mother |
| Sun Min | "fourth sworn sister" | sworn sisters of Xiaoyanhong and Jiang Lili's mother |
| Ye Qing | "fifth sworn sister" | sworn sisters of Xiaoyanhong and Jiang Lili's mother |
| Yuan Ping | "sixth sworn sister" | sworn sisters of Xiaoyanhong and Jiang Lili's mother |
| Zhou Xiaoli | "seventh sworn sister" | sworn sisters of Xiaoyanhong and Jiang Lili's mother |
| Zhao Zhenzhong | Li Puzhi's adjutant | actually a Communist spy |
| Tan Zengwei | "Mugen" | Jiang family's butler |
| Li Daojun | Jiang family's tailor | |
| Xiang Mei | Wang Qiyao's grandma | |
| Sun Qixin | Yu Qing | servant and lover of Wang Qiyao's grandma |
| Si Xiao | Wang Hongcai | "Deuce" |
Episodes 14–35
| Chen Qing | Wang Qiming (older) | |
| Liu Xiao | Cuifen | Wang Qiming's wife |
| Zhang Dongwei (child) | Maomao | Wang Qiming's son |
| Zhang Hongming | Mr. Zhang | Jiang Lili's leader and eventual husband |
| Ni Hongjie | Gu Mali | Cheng Shidi's neighbor who likes him |
| Wang Yin | Liu Mei | Cheng Shidi's colleague in the library |
| Wang Guojing | Yan Shande | "Mr. Yan" |
| Jin Meng | Lu Yunying | "Madame Yan" |
| Li Shuai (child) | Yan Xiaodi (Lu Yunying's son) | |
| Yu Cunshi (teen) | Yan Xiaodi (Lu Yunying's son) | led Red Guards to ransack Wang Qiyao's apartment |
| Zhou Hao | Yan Xiaodi (Lu Yunying's son) | dated Weiwei before realizing they were related |
| Fang Ling | Fengdi | Yan family's maidservant |
| Dai Zhao'an | Aliu | a neighbour in Peace Lane |
| Huang Lijuan | Qian Yingying | Aliu's wife |
| Xu Zheng | Kang Mingxun | |
| Xu Chengxian | Kang Mingxun's father | |
| Chen Hongmei | Kang Mingxun's "Mother" | not his real mother |
| Chen Jianfei | Kang Mingxun's "Second Mother" | his real mother |
| Shi Tingting | Kang Mingni | Kang Mingxun's younger half-sisters |
| Wang Yun | Kang Mingshan | Kang Mingxun's younger half-sisters |
| Zhao Rongrong | Kang family's maidservant | |
| Ji Xueping | Xu Yuanyuan | Kang Mingxun's date and eventual wife |
| Bahtiyar Aziz | Sasha | |
| Sheng Zhao (child) | Wang Weiwei | |
| Gao Si | Wang Weiwei | dated both Yan Xiaodi and Feng Yongli |
| Shen Yue | Zhang Yonghong | dated Feng Yongli |
| Liu Lei | Feng Yongli | "Old Colour" |
| Xu Fu | Feng Yongli's father | Cheng Shidi's colleague in the library |
