= Thunderstorm (opera) =

2006 Shanghai production poster

Leiyu (雷雨 "Thunderstorm") is a 2001 Chinese-language western-style opera by Hangzhou-born composer Mo Fan based on Thunderstorm by Cao Yu. True to the setting of the play Mo Fan introduced 1930s Shanghai salon tunes into the opera.

The opera was commissioned by the Shanghai Opera House company, and was presented in concert in 2001 and full dress form in 2006. The opera was taken by the Shanghai company among four of its productions to present in the inaugural 2008-2009 season of Beijing's CHNCPA, or "Big Egg" on Tiananmen Square East.
