= Lapse (social network) =

British social media platform

- Original authors: Dan Silvertown; Ben Silvertown
- Developer: Lapse Ltd.
- Initial release: 2021
- Platform: iOS 16 or later
- Website: lapse.com

Lapse is a British social media platform and photo-sharing app. Co-founded by Dan and Ben Silvertown in 2021, the app offers users the ability to take and share images, as well as interact with other users' posts through comments and reactions. It also lets users form groups to collaborate to produce a digital photo collection. It gained popularity with its launch in 2021 and later in 2023 when it was re-released as invitation-only.

Similar to BeReal and Dispo, a user's photo is “processed” in a “dark room” for a few hours and cannot be edited in any form, producing a grainy image style resembling that of analog photography. Branding itself as "for Friends not Followers" on Apple's App Store, it has a focus on being "authentic" on social media.

== History ==
=== 2021 launch ===
Lapse was originally launched in 2021 to mimic the style of a point-and-shoot camera, but refocused as a "photo dump" journal like the mobile app VSCO. After a pre-seed funding round of $1.4 million, the app was launched on the App Store in September 2021 and attracted 10,000 beta test users, along with a 150,000 member waiting list. In December 2021, the company raised $11 million in a seed round of funding.

=== 2023 re-release ===
The app was re-released in June 2023. The release controversially required new users to invite five new users before attaining posting permissions, described by TechCrunch reporter Sarah Perez as "forcing you to invite your friends." This helped the app gain users and widespread popularity beginning September 2023. According to Appfigures, Lapse peaked at 218,000 downloads in a day in October and briefly became the most downloaded app on the U.S. App Store, and maintained in the top 5 daily. As of October 2023, Lapse had almost 1.2 million users, reflecting its rapid adoption among younger audiences.

=== 2024 Funding ===
On February 27, 2024, Lapse secured $30 million in funding from investors Greylock Partners and DST Global Partners. This investment is part of the company's efforts to expand its workforce, with plans to hire additional personnel in product development, engineering, and design. The funding comes after a period of growth, including a significant increase in the app's user base following its re-release in mid-2023. The company stated that the new capital will help to improve the platform's capabilities and user experience as it continues to compete in the social media space.

=== 2025 Removal of Social Features ===
On November 3rd, 2025, Lapse has announced the removal of their social features, continuing on with the struggle of storage for the user-snaps taken on their platform, it was being decided between shutting down the app, or removing the social aspect of the app, and with that, it was announced that early December that all of the social-related features were going to be removed as to saving the app from shutting down
