= Runaways (musical) =

- Original Broadway Playbill
- Music: Elizabeth Swados
- Lyrics: Elizabeth Swados
- Book: Elizabeth Swados
- Productions: 1978 Off-Broadway; 1978 Broadway; 2016 Encores! Off-Center

Runaways is a musical which was written, composed, choreographed and directed by Elizabeth Swados, about the lives of children who run away from home and live on the city streets. The characters were taken from workshops conducted by Swados with real-life runaways in the late 1970s.

== Background ==
Swados took her idea for a musical with the theme of running away "from home, from a boyfriend, from a predator,... from yourself" to Joseph Papp, who agreed to produce it. She looked for the children who would be in the musical in various places in New York City, such as a community center, and "little by little, we built a world where runaways came together, told their stories, and acted out the hardships they endured." Swados did research for her project as she gathered the cast, and some in the cast were actual runaways. The show was done in a series of songs, monologues, scenes, poems, and dances.

== Productions ==
The musical premiered off-Broadway on February 21, 1978, at the Public Theater Cabaret as presented by the New York Shakespeare Festival. It moved to Broadway at the Plymouth Theatre on May 13, 1978, and closed on December 31, 1978, after 12 previews and 274 performances. The director and choreographer was Elizabeth Swados, with scenic design by Douglas W. Schmidt and Woods Mackintosh, costume design by Hilary Rosenfeld, and lighting design by Jennifer Tipton. In 2007, a re-worked concert version of the show produced by Jamie McGonnigal and directed by Rodney Hicks played at Joe's Pub. The orchestra consisted of Piano and Toy Piano, String Bass, Congas, Timbales, Bongos, Bell Sirens and Others, Trap Set, Triangle, Glass and Ratchet, Saxophone and Flutes, and Guitar (played by Elizabeth Swados).

The musical was presented in 2016 as part of New York City Center's Encores! Off-Center's concert series. It was done under the artistic direction of Jeanine Tesori and the direction of Sam Pinkleton. It was performed July 6 to 9, with a cast of 25 young performers between the ages of 12 and 20: Frenie Acoba, Sumaya Bouhbal, Kenneth Cabral, Maxwell Cabral, Taylor Caldwell, Sophia Anne Caruso, Xavier Casimir, Joshua DeJesus, Adleesa Edwards, Aidan Gemme, Reyna Guerra, Matthew Gumley, Christina Jimenez, Kylie McNeill, Cele Pahucki, Sam Poon, Siena Rafter, Claudia Ramirez, Ren, Michaela Jaé Rodriguez, Deandre Sevon, Jeremy Shinder, Ripley Sobo, Chris Sumpter and Maxwell Vice. Elizabeth Swados was supposed to have been involved with this production, had she not died earlier in 2016. Tesori said: "Since we can’t do 'Runaways' with her, we’ll now do it for her." This production was restaged at the Delacorte Theater in June 2018 for two days only to celebrate the 40th anniversary of Runaways, with much of the Encores! cast reprising their roles.

== Original Broadway cast ==
- Hubbell — Bruce Hlibok
- Interpreter for Hubbell — Lorie Robinson
- A.J. — Carlo Imperato
- Jackie — Rachael Kelly (Diane Lane played the role at the Public)
- Luis — Ray Contreras
- Nikki Kay Kane — Nan-Lynn Nelson
- Lidia — Josie de Guzman
- Manny — Randy Ruiz
- Eddie — Jon Matthews
- Sundar — Bernie Allison
- Roby — Venustra K. Robinson
- Lazar — David Schechter
- Eric — Evan H. Miranda
- Iggy — Jonathan Feig
- Jane — Kate Schellenbach
- Ez — Leonard D. Brown
- Mex-Mongo — Mark Anthony Butler
- Melinda — Trini Alvarado
- Deidre — Karen Evans
- Mocha — Sheila Gibbs
- Ensemble - Toby Parker
- Ensemble - Timmy Michaels (Michael Demetrious)

== Synopsis summary ==
20 "multi racial, multi ethnic" children explore the "fragmented" life of the runaway in an inner city. Through songs, monologues and poems the children examine and explain why they are runaways. They are abused, come from broken families, or are in an orphanage. The children show a range of emotions, and are seen as victims but also "perpetrators". They "plead with their families and society 'Let Me Be A Kid Again.'"

== Songs and scenes ==
Act I

- You Don't Understand
- I Had to Go
- Parent/Kid Dance
- Appendectomy
- Where Do People Go (song)
- Footsteps
- Once Upon a Time
- Current Events
- Every Now and Then (song)
- Out on the Street
- Minnesota Strip (song)
- Song of a Child Prostitute (song)
- Christmas Puppies
- Lazar's Heroes
- Find Me a Hero (song)
- Scrynatchkielooaw
- The Undiscovered Son (song)
- I Went Back Home
- This is What I Do When I'm Angry
- The Basketball Song (song)
- Dance
- Spoons
- Lullaby for Luis (song)
- We Are Not Strangers (song)

Act II

- In the Sleeping Line
- I Will Not Tell a Soul
- Revenge Song (song)
- Enterprise (song)
- Lullaby from Baby to Baby (song)
- Sometimes (song)
- Clothes
- Mr. Graffiti
- The Untrue Pigeon (song)
- Señoras de la Noche
- We Have to Die?
- Where Are Those People Who Did 'Hair'? (song)
- Appendectomy II
- Let Me Be a Kid (song)
- To the Dead of Family Wars
- Problem After Problem
- Lonesome of the Road/Let Me Be a Kid (Reprise) (song)

== Response ==
According to Cecil A. Smith, "It was a novel show, even for a period of musical theatre that sought novelty. Angry, disturbing, and ultimately too prosaic for sustained musical flight, it was complete proof that Elizabeth Swados had new plans for the musical and that she had the talent to realize them.

Harold Clurman wrote: "Though the show offers a number of attractive features, only a few of them are actually congruent with its theme...There are...a few charming numbers: one of them is called 'Enterprise' derisive of our national fetish...The Swados music is utilitarian rather than lyrically or dramatically expressive-it is employed, as in the Japanese or Chinese theatres, as sound to call attention to signal moments...Even if I had liked more of the numbers than I did, I would still have thought 'too much show!' ".

The New York Times reviewer wrote of the Public Theater production that the show was an "inspired musical collage... [it] takes a harsh and uncompromising look at the world of runaways, but it is written and performed with great compassion." The music is "disco, salsa, country and western and blues...Not just the songs, but the soliloquies and poems - some of them contributed by members of the cast - are also deeply personal...In all aspects 'Runaways' is a triumph."

== Awards and nominations ==
=== Original Off-Broadway production ===
Year	Award	Category	Nominee	Result
1978	Obie Award	Best Direction	Elizabeth Swados	Won

=== Original Broadway production ===
Year	Award	Category	Nominee	Result
1978	Tony Award	Best Musical		Nominated
1978	Tony Award	Best Book of a Musical	Elizabeth Swados	Nominated
1978	Tony Award	Best Original Score	Elizabeth Swados	Nominated
1978	Tony Award	Best Direction of a Musical	Elizabeth Swados	Nominated
1978	Tony Award	Best Choreography	Elizabeth Swados	Nominated
1978	Drama Desk Award	Outstanding Musical		Nominated
1978	Drama Desk Award	Outstanding Director of a Musical	Elizabeth Swados	Nominated
1978	Drama Desk Award	Outstanding Lyrics	Elizabeth Swados	Nominated
1978	Drama Desk Award	Outstanding Music	Elizabeth Swados	Nominated
