= My Depression (The Up and Down and Up of It) =

- Film poster
- Directed by: Robert Marianetti; Elizabeth Swados; David Wachtenheim
- Written by: Robert Marianetti; Elizabeth Swados; David Wachtenheim
- Based on: My Depression: A Picture Book by Elizabeth Swados
- Produced by: Josh Hetzler; Rosalind Lichter
- Starring: Sigourney Weaver; Steve Buscemi; Fred Armisen; Dan Fogler
- Music by: Dave Nelson; Elizabeth Swados
- Release date: April 24, 2014 (Tribeca Film Festival)
- Running time: 30 minutes
- Country: United States
- Language: English

My Depression (The Up and Down and Up of It) is a 2014 animated short film based on My Depression: A Picture Book by Elizabeth Swados. The film was written and directed by Swados, Robert Marianetti and David Wachtenheim, and featured the voices of Sigourney Weaver, Steve Buscemi and Fred Armisen. Distributed by HBO, My Depression was premiered at the 2014 Tribeca Film Festival and competed in Best Documentary (Short Film).

== Cast ==
- Sigourney Weaver
- Steve Buscemi as "Suicidal Thoughts"
- Fred Armisen
- Dan Fogler
- Rachel Stern as Vocal

== Critical response ==
The New York Times described the film "as charming and whimsical a discussion of depression as you’re likely to find... it's honest and forthright as it talks about a condition often misunderstood and misrepresented." BroadwayWorld commented, "Simultaneously heartfelt and entertaining, My Depression illuminates the symptoms, emotions and side effects of the disorder through witty animation, comedy and unique musical numbers."
