= My Depression: A Picture Book =

2005 book by Elizabeth Swados

My Depression
- Author: Elizabeth Swados
- Language: English
- Genre: picture book
- Published: 2005, Hyperion Books
- Publication place: United States
- Pages: 176
- ISBN: 1-4013-0789-2

My Depression: A Picture Book is a 2005 picture book written and illustrated by Elizabeth Swados about her personal experiences and struggles battling depression.

== Reception ==
Donna Seaman wrote that "Swados' candid, seemingly simple tale conveys a wealth of helpful information and dispels the gloom a bit by making readers laugh." Christian Perring wrote that Swados "does give a clear sense of how disabling and awful it is to have depression", but called her drawings "very crude" and "amateurish". In Graphic Medicine, Velebita Koričančić used the metaphor of "syncopated rhythm" to analyze how Swados' book paces depression through an uneven tempo, interruption and recurrence.

== Translations ==
The book has been translated to Chinese:

- In the People's Republic of China: Wo de Yiyuzheng (我的抑郁症). Translated by Wang Anyi. New Star Press. 2007.
- In Taiwan: Shiwadou de Yuwang zhi Lü (石瓦豆的鬱望之旅). Translated by Cheng Hui-ching. Living Psychology Publisher. 2007.

== Adaptations ==
The book was adapted into a 2014 animated television film, My Depression (The Up and Down and Up of It). The short film was written and directed by Swados with Robert Marianetti and David Wachtenheim and stars Sigourney Weaver as Liz.
