= Constitutional monarchy =

Form of government

World's states colored by systems of government: Parliamentary systems: Head of government is elected or nominated by and accountable to the legislature. Constitutional monarchy with a ceremonial monarch Semi-constitutional monarchy: Monarch holds significant executive or legislative power but is still restricted by the constitution. Parliamentary republic with a ceremonial president Parliamentary republic with an executive president Presidential system: Head of government (president) is popularly elected and independent of the legislature. Presidential republic Theocratic presidential republic: Supreme leader is highest authority; popularly elected president still exists. Hybrid systems: Semi-presidential republic: Executive president is independent of the legislature; head of government is appointed by the president and is accountable to the legislature. Assembly-independent republic: Head of government (president or directory) is elected by the legislature, but is not accountable to it. Other systems: Islamic theocracy: Supreme leader holds unlimited political and religious power; state and faith are a single institution. Absolute monarchy: Monarch has unlimited power. One-party state: Power is constitutionally linked to a single political party. Provisional government: Current regime is temporary or transitional; no permanent constitution. Military junta: Committee of military leaders controls the government; constitutional provisions are suspended. Places without governments. Note: this chart represents the de jure systems of government, not the de facto degree of democracy.

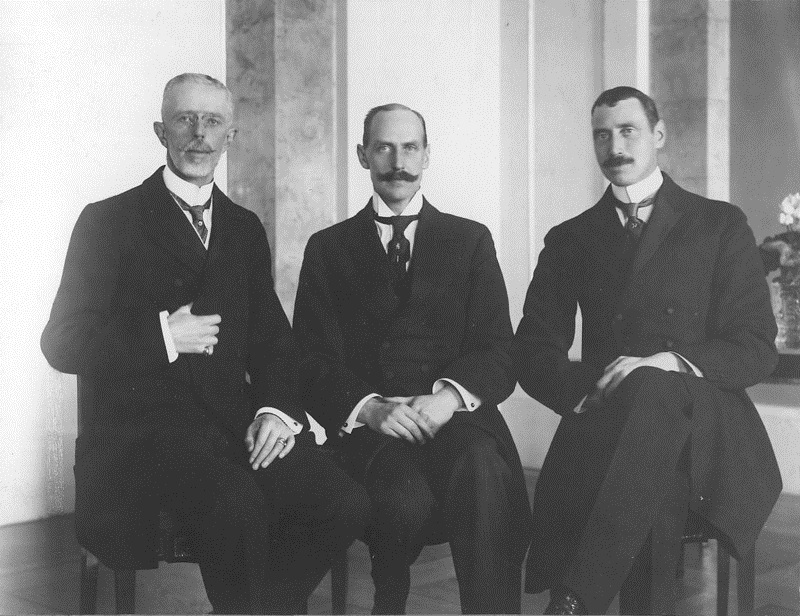
The three constitutional monarchs of the Scandinavian kingdoms of Sweden, Norway and Denmark gathered in November 1917 in Oslo. From left to right: Gustaf V, Haakon VII and Christian X.

Constitutional monarchy, also known as limited monarchy, parliamentary monarchy or democratic monarchy, is a form of monarchy in which the monarch exercises their authority in accordance with a constitution and is not alone in making decisions. Constitutional monarchies differ from absolute monarchies (in which a monarch is the only decision-maker) in that they are bound to exercise powers and authorities within limits prescribed by an established legal framework. The monarch is frequently perceived as a visible symbol of national unity.

The powers of constitutional monarchs vary. In some countries, the monarch has virtually no executive or policy-making power and is primarily a hereditary symbolic head of state (who may be an emperor, king or queen, prince or grand duke), while in other countries, the monarch has meaningful formal powers (such as veto power, appointment power, and power to dissolve parliament).

In countries such as Liechtenstein, Monaco, Morocco, Jordan, Kuwait, Bahrain, Thailand and Bhutan, the constitution grants substantial discretionary powers to the sovereign, while in United Kingdom and other Commonwealth realms, the Netherlands, Spain, Luxembourg, Belgium, Denmark, Norway, Sweden, Lesotho, Malaysia, Cambodia, and Japan, the monarch retains significantly less, if any, personal discretion in the exercise of their authority. While many constitutional monarchies are democratic, some are not.

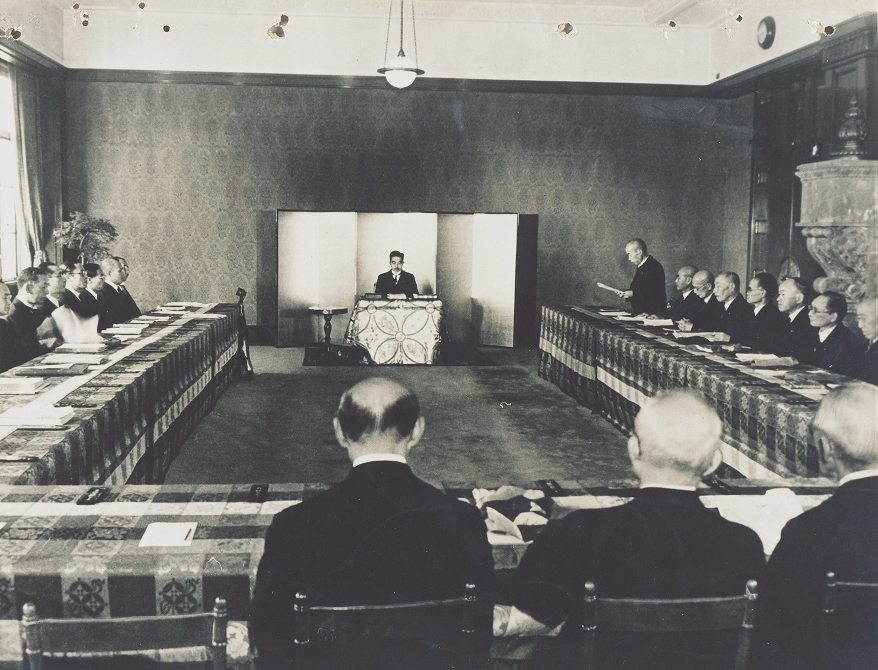
A meeting in the Japanese privy council in 1946 led by Hirohito

The Commonwealth realms share the same person as a ceremonial hereditary monarchy under the Westminster system of constitutional governance. Two constitutional monarchies – Malaysia and Cambodia – are elective monarchies, in which the ruler is periodically selected by a small electoral college.

Some use the term semi-constitutional monarchy to identify constitutional monarchies where the monarch retains substantial powers, on a par with a president in a presidential or semi-presidential system. Numerous liberal democracies restrain monarchic power in practice rather than written law, e.g., the constitution of the United Kingdom, which affords the monarch substantial, if limited, legislative and executive powers.

== History ==
The oldest constitutional monarchy dating back to ancient times was that of the Hittites. They were an ancient Anatolian people that lived during the Bronze Age whose king had to share his authority with an assembly, called the Panku, which was the equivalent to a modern-day deliberative assembly or a legislature. Members of the Panku came from scattered noble families who worked as representatives of their subjects in an adjutant or subaltern federal-type landscape.

According to Herodotus, Demonax created a constitutional monarchy for King Battus III the Lame, of Cyrene, when Cyrenaica had become an unstable state, in about 548 BC.

=== Constitutional and absolute monarchy ===
==== England, Scotland and the United Kingdom ====
In the Kingdom of England, the Glorious Revolution of 1688 furthered the constitutional monarchy, restricted by laws such as the Bill of Rights 1689 and the Act of Settlement 1701, although the first form of constitution was enacted with Magna Carta of 1215. At the same time, in Scotland, the Convention of Estates enacted the Claim of Right Act 1689, which placed similar limits on the Scottish monarchy.

Queen Anne was the last monarch to veto an Act of Parliament when, on 11 March 1708, she blocked the Scottish Militia Bill. However Hanoverian monarchs continued to selectively dictate government policies. For instance King George III constantly blocked Catholic Emancipation, eventually precipitating the resignation of William Pitt the Younger as prime minister in 1801. The sovereign's influence on the choice of prime minister gradually declined over this period. The Fox-North Coalition came to power on 2 April 1783, in spite of the King's resistance. It was the first time that George III had been allowed no role in determining who should hold government office.

King William IV was the last monarch to dismiss a prime minister, when in 1834 he removed Lord Melbourne as a result of Melbourne's choice of Lord John Russell as Leader of the House of Commons. Queen Victoria was the last monarch to exercise real personal power, but this diminished over the course of her reign. In 1839, she became the last sovereign to keep a prime minister in power against the will of Parliament when the Bedchamber crisis resulted in the retention of Lord Melbourne's administration. By the end of her reign, however, she could do nothing to block the unacceptable (to her) premierships of William Gladstone, although she still exercised power in appointments to the Cabinet. For example, in 1886 she vetoed Gladstone's choice of Hugh Childers as War Secretary in favor of Sir Henry Campbell-Bannerman.

Today, the role of the British monarch is by convention effectively ceremonial. The British Parliament and the Government – chiefly in the office of Prime Minister of the United Kingdom – exercise their powers under "royal (or Crown) prerogative": on behalf of the monarch and through powers still formally possessed by the monarch.

No person may accept significant public office without swearing an oath of allegiance to the King. With few exceptions, the monarch is bound by constitutional convention to act on the advice of the government.

==== Continental Europe ====
Poland developed the first constitution for a monarchy in continental Europe, with the Constitution of 3 May 1791; it was the second single-document constitution in the world just after the first republican Constitution of the United States. Constitutional monarchy also occurred briefly in the early years of the French Revolution, but much more widely afterwards. Napoleon Bonaparte is considered the first monarch proclaiming himself as an embodiment of the nation, rather than as a divinely appointed ruler; this interpretation of monarchy is germane to continental constitutional monarchies. German philosopher Georg Wilhelm Friedrich Hegel, in his work Elements of the Philosophy of Right (1820), gave the concept a philosophical justification that concurred with evolving contemporary political theory and the Protestant Christian view of natural law. Hegel's forecast of a constitutional monarch with very limited powers whose function is to embody the national character and provide constitutional continuity in times of emergency was reflected in the development of constitutional monarchies in Europe and Japan.

==== Executive monarchy versus ceremonial monarchy ====
There exist at least two different types of constitutional monarchies in the modern world – executive and ceremonial.

In executive monarchies (also called semi-constitutional monarchies), the monarch wields significant (though not absolute) power, though it is often limited to opting and dismissing ministers or other government officials. The monarchy under this system of government is a powerful political (and social) institution. Semi-monarchy is a distinct regime type characterized by a collegial executive, a hereditary monarch with substantive powers who appoints the cabinet, dual cabinet accountability to both the monarch and the legislature, and the monarch's authority to dissolve the assembly.

By contrast, in ceremonial monarchies (also called crowned republics), the monarch holds little to no actual power or direct political influence.

For instance, when Hereditary Prince Alois of Liechtenstein threatened to veto a possible approval of a referendum to legalize abortion in 2011, it came as a surprise because the prince had not vetoed any law for over 30 years (in the end, this was moot, as the proposal was not approved).

=== Modern constitutional monarchy ===
As originally conceived, a constitutional monarch was head of the executive branch and quite a powerful figure even though their power was limited by the constitution and the elected parliament. Some of the framers of the U.S. Constitution may have envisioned the president as an elected constitutional monarch, as the term was then understood, following Montesquieu's account of the separation of powers.

The present-day concept of a constitutional monarchy developed primarily in the United Kingdom, where a democratically elected parliament and the executive government formed from the ranks of the majority party, led by a prime minister, exercise true power while the monarch remains as a largely vestigial and constrained position (in the Commonwealth nations, the monarch is bound to take the advice of his or her government ministers, and has very limited 'reserve powers').

Nations of the Commonwealth and European democracies are where much of the working out of the contours and limits of constitutional monarchs' powers has been done, primarily over the last century. In the course of France's July Monarchy, Louis-Philippe I was styled "King of the French" rather than "King of France". Following the unification of Germany, Otto von Bismarck rejected the British model. In the constitutional monarchy established under the Constitution of the German Empire which Bismarck inspired, the Kaiser retained considerable actual executive power, while the Imperial Chancellor needed no parliamentary vote of confidence and ruled solely by the imperial mandate. However, this model of constitutional monarchy was discredited and abolished following Germany's defeat in the First World War. Later, Fascist Italy could also be considered a constitutional monarchy, in that there was a king as the titular head of state while actual power was held by Benito Mussolini under a constitution. This eventually discredited the Italian monarchy and led to its abolition in 1946. After the Second World War, surviving European monarchies almost invariably adopted some variant of the constitutional monarchy model originally developed in Britain.

A parliamentary democracy may be a constitutional monarchy or a republic, differing only in terms of titles and rules of succession rather than in substantial exercise of power. In both cases, the titular head of state – monarch or president – serves the traditional role of embodying and representing the nation, while the government is carried on by a cabinet enjoying the support - or at least the toleration - of a majority of Members of Parliament.

However, three important factors distinguish monarchies such as the United Kingdom from systems where greater power might otherwise rest with Parliament. These are:

- The royal prerogative, under which the monarch may exercise power under certain very limited circumstances
- Sovereign immunity, under which the monarch may do no wrong under the law because the responsible government is instead deemed accountable
- The immunity of the monarch from some taxation or restrictions on property use

Other privileges may be nominal or ceremonial (e.g., where the executive, judiciary, police or armed forces act on the authority of or owe allegiance to the Crown).

Today slightly more than a quarter of constitutional monarchies are Western European countries, including the United Kingdom, Spain, the Netherlands, Belgium, Norway, Denmark, Luxembourg, Monaco, Liechtenstein and Sweden. However, the two most populous constitutional monarchies in the world are in Asia: Japan and Thailand. In these countries, the prime minister holds the day-to-day powers of governance, while the monarch retains residual (but not always insignificant) powers. The powers of the monarch differ between countries. In Denmark and in Belgium, for example, the monarch formally appoints a representative to preside over the creation of a coalition government following a parliamentary election, while in Norway the King chairs special meetings of the cabinet.

In nearly all cases, the monarch is still the nominal chief executive, but is bound by convention to act on the advice of the Cabinet. However, a few monarchies (most notably Japan and Sweden) have amended their constitutions so that the monarch is no longer the nominal chief executive.

There are fifteen constitutional monarchies under King Charles III, which are known as Commonwealth realms. Unlike some of their continental European counterparts, the Monarch and his Governors-General in the Commonwealth realms hold significant "reserve" or "prerogative" powers, to be wielded in times of extreme emergency or constitutional crises, usually to uphold parliamentary government. For example, during the 1975 Australian constitutional crisis, the Governor-General dismissed the Australian Prime Minister Gough Whitlam. The Australian Senate had threatened to block the Government's budget by refusing to pass the necessary appropriation bills. On 11 November 1975, Whitlam intended to call a half-Senate election to try to break the deadlock. When he sought the Governor-General's approval of the election, the Governor-General instead dismissed him as prime minister. Shortly after that, he installed leader of the opposition Malcolm Fraser in his place. Acting quickly before all parliamentarians became aware of the government change, Fraser and his allies secured passage of the appropriation bills, and the Governor-General dissolved Parliament for a double dissolution election. Fraser and his government were returned with a massive majority. This led to much speculation among Whitlam's supporters as to whether this use of the Governor-General's reserve powers was appropriate, and whether Australia should become a republic. Among supporters of constitutional monarchy, however, the event confirmed the monarchy's value as a source of checks and balances against elected politicians who might seek powers in excess of those conferred by the constitution, and ultimately as a safeguard against dictatorship.

In Thailand's constitutional monarchy, the monarch is recognized as the Head of State, Head of the Armed Forces, Upholder of the Buddhist Religion, and Defender of the Faith. The immediate former King, Bhumibol Adulyadej, was among the longest-reigning monarch in the world and the longest in all of Thailand's history, before dying on 13 October 2016. Bhumibol reigned through several political changes in the Thai government. He played an influential role in each incident, often acting as mediator between disputing political opponents. (See Bhumibol's role in Thai Politics.) Among the powers retained by the Thai monarch under the constitution, lèse majesté protects the image of the monarch and enables him to play a role in politics. It carries strict criminal penalties for violators. Generally, the Thai people were reverent of Bhumibol. Much of his social influence arose from this reverence and from the socioeconomic improvement efforts undertaken by the royal family.

In the United Kingdom, a frequent debate centres on when it is appropriate for a British monarch to act. When a monarch does act, political controversy can often ensue, partially because the neutrality of the crown is seen to be compromised in favour of a partisan goal, while some political scientists champion the idea of an "interventionist monarch" as a check against possible illegal action by politicians. For instance, the monarch of the United Kingdom can theoretically exercise an absolute veto over legislation by withholding royal assent. However, no monarch has done so since 1708, and it is widely believed that this and many of the monarch's other political powers are lapsed powers.

In The English Constitution, British political theorist Walter Bagehot identified three main political rights which a constitutional monarch may freely exercise: the right to be consulted, the right to encourage, and the right to warn. Many constitutional monarchies still retain significant authorities or political influence, however, such as through certain reserve powers, and may also play an important political role. Political scientist Vernon Bogdanor, paraphrasing Thomas Macaulay, has defined a constitutional monarch as "A sovereign who reigns but does not rule". Strongly limited constitutional monarchies, such as those of the United Kingdom and Australia, have been referred to as crowned republics by writers H. G. Wells and Glenn Patmore.

== List of current constitutional monarchies ==
There are currently 43 monarchies worldwide.

=== Ceremonial constitutional monarchies ===
- Andorra
- Antigua and Barbuda (Note: Commonwealth realms, which share the same person as their monarch, currently King Charles III.)
- Australia
- The Bahamas
- Belgium
- Belize
- Cambodia
- Canada
- Cook Islands
- Danish Realm
  - Denmark
  - Faroe Islands
  - Greenland
- Grenada
- Indonesia (Note: Indonesia, a presidential republic, has a province with a monarch as its ceremonial head.)
  - Special Region of Yogyakarta
- Jamaica
- Japan
- Lesotho
- Luxembourg
- Malaysia
  - Johor
  - Kedah
  - Kelantan
  - Negeri Sembilan
  - Pahang
  - Perak
  - Perlis
  - Selangor
  - Terengganu
- Kingdom of the Netherlands
  - Netherlands
  - Aruba
  - Curaçao
  - Sint Maarten
- Niue
- New Zealand
- Norway
- Papua New Guinea
- Saint Kitts and Nevis
- Saint Lucia
- Saint Vincent and the Grenadines
- Solomon Islands
- South Africa (Note: South Africa, a presidential-parliamentary republic, has a province with a monarch as its ceremonial head.)
  - (Kwa-Zulu Natal) KwaZulu-Natal
- Spain
- Sweden
- Thailand
- Tuvalu
- United Kingdom
  - England
  - Scotland
  - Wales
  - Northern Ireland

=== Executive constitutional monarchies ===
- Bahrain
- Bhutan (Note: Per Congress.gov, Bhutan is a constitutional monarchy with a parliamentary government.)
- Jordan
- Kuwait
- Liechtenstein
- Monaco
- Morocco
- Qatar
- Tonga
- United Arab Emirates
  - (Emirate of Abu Dhabi) Abu Dhabi
  - (Emirate of Dubai) Dubai
  - (Emirate of Sharjah) Sharjah
  - (Emirate of Ajman) Ajman
  - Umm al-Quwain
  - (Emirate of Ras Al Khaimah) Ras Al Khaimah
  - (Emirate of Fujairah) Fujairah (Note: In the case of the United Arab Emirates, the president functions as the head of state of a federation of seven absolute monarchies, and is de jure elected by the Federal Supreme Council from among its members; the prime minister is de jure appointed and is the head of government. The president and prime minister are de facto the rulers of the absolute monarchies of Abu Dhabi and Dubai, respectively.)

== Former constitutional monarchies ==
- The Kingdom of Afghanistan was a constitutional monarchy under Mohammad Zahir Shah from 1964 to 1973.
- The Hashemite Kingdom of Iraq was a constitutional monarchy until 1958 when King Faisal II was deposed in a military coup.
- The Anglo-Corsican Kingdom was a brief period in the history of Corsica (1794–1796) when the island broke with Revolutionary France and sought military protection from Great Britain. Corsica became an independent kingdom under George III of the United Kingdom, but with its own elected parliament and a written constitution guaranteeing local autonomy and democratic rights.

== Other variants of constitutional monarchies ==
Japan is the only country remaining with an emperor. The Spanish Constitution does not recognize the Spanish Monarch as the sovereign, but as the head of state [Section 56(1)]. It states "National Sovereignty belongs to the Spanish People, from whom all state powers emanate."

== See also ==
- Australian Monarchist League
- Criticism of monarchy
- Monarchism
- Figurehead
- Parliamentary republic
- Reserve power
