= Lapse of Time =

1982 novella by Wang Anyi

- cover of the anthology in English translation published by China Books
- Author: Wang Anyi
- Original title: '流逝'
- Translator: Howard Goldblatt (1988)
- Language: Chinese
- Set in: 1960s/1970s Shanghai
- Publication date: 1982
- Publication place: China

Lapse of Time
- Chinese: 流逝
Transcriptions
Standard Mandarin
- Hanyu Pinyin: Liúshì

Lapse of Time is a 1982 Chinese novella by Wang Anyi. The novella follows Ouyang Duanli, a strong-minded Shanghai woman who worked hard to support her and her husband's large family during the Cultural Revolution when they were attacked as "former bourgeois".

It was translated by Howard Goldblatt and published in the 1988 anthology of the same name.

== Reception ==
Kirkus Reviews praised the novella as having "the feel of a small epic yet never lapses into sentimentality or melodrama". Noting the author's social background before the Cultural Revolution, Rosemary Haddon felt Ouyang Duanli was Wang's persona and wrote that "driven by the proletarian standard, Wang Anyi has won a small victory in China's class struggle". Michael S. Duke, however, was highly critical of the novella for containing "all the major faults of Wang's writing: excessive wordiness, repetitiveness, unrealistic or stereotypical characterizations, overly abrupt changes in moral character, didacticism, and shallow moralizing". Aamer Hussein also noted the "insipid" approach but called Wang's examination of relationships "moving and perceptive" and the novellas an "honest account of a woman's search".

== Awards ==
- 2nd National Novella Prize awarded by China Writers Association

== Adaptation ==
- The Zhang Family's Daughter-in-Law, a 1985 film directed by Ye Ming, starring Li Lan
