= Everlasting Regret =

2005 Hong Kong film by Stanley Kwan

- DVD cover
- Traditional Chinese: 長恨歌
- Simplified Chinese: 长恨歌
- Hanyu Pinyin: Cháng Hèn Gē
- Directed by: Stanley Kwan
- Written by: Elmond Yeung
- Based on: The Song of Everlasting Sorrow by Wang Anyi
- Produced by: Jackie Chan; Willie Chan; Fang Jun; Xu Pengle; Chen Baoping
- Starring: Sammi Cheng; Tony Leung; Hu Jun; Daniel Wu
- Cinematography: Huang Lian
- Edited by: Chan Chi-Wai; William Chang; Cheng Xiaohong
- Music by: Brother Hung
- Distributed by: Hong Kong: Golden Scene; JCE Movies Limited; Singapore: Shaw Organisation; Festive Films
- Release date: 29 September 2005 (Hong Kong)
- Running time: 115 minutes
- Country: Hong Kong
- Language: Mandarin

Everlasting Regret is a 2005 Hong Kong film directed by Stanley Kwan, and produced by Jackie Chan. It is based on Wang Anyi's 1995 novel The Song of Everlasting Sorrow, about a woman's turbulent life in 20th century Shanghai.

The film participated in the 62nd Venice International Film Festival and was shown at the 41st Chicago International Film Festival.

== Cast ==
- Sammi Cheng – Wang Qiyao
- Tony Leung Ka-fai – Cheng Shilu (Mr. Cheng)
- Hu Jun – Li Zhongde (Director Li)
- Daniel Wu – Kang Mingxun
- Huang Jue – "Old Colour"
- Su Yan – Jiang Lili
- Huang Yi – Weiwei
- Yumiko Cheng – Zhang Yonghong
- Wu Jing – Wang Qiyao's mother
- Lan Yan (as extra)

== See also ==
- Jackie Chan filmography
