= Lapsed power =

Constitutionally granted power no longer in use

In politics and government, lapsed power is a term often used to describe a certain constitutionally granted power of government that is no longer used, according to constitutional convention. This may be because the power's original conditions of use no longer exist, making it an anachronism, or simply because the nation's political culture and attitudes have shifted, making the power appear too morally or ethically objectionable to use. However, the power still exists.

Examples of lapsed powers include the reserve powers of a monarch under a constitutional monarchy. Constitutional monarchs have significant powers over matters such as the appointment of the prime minister or the veto of legislation, but in practice these powers are rarely actually used independently.

Comparative public law scholar Richard Albert has theorized a related phenomenon he calls "constitutional desuetude", which occurs "when an entrenched constitutional provision loses its binding force upon political actors as a result of its conscious sustained nonuse and public repudiation by preceding and present political actors."

== See also ==
- Regionalism (politics)
- Reserve power
