= Photo dump =

Social media posting trend

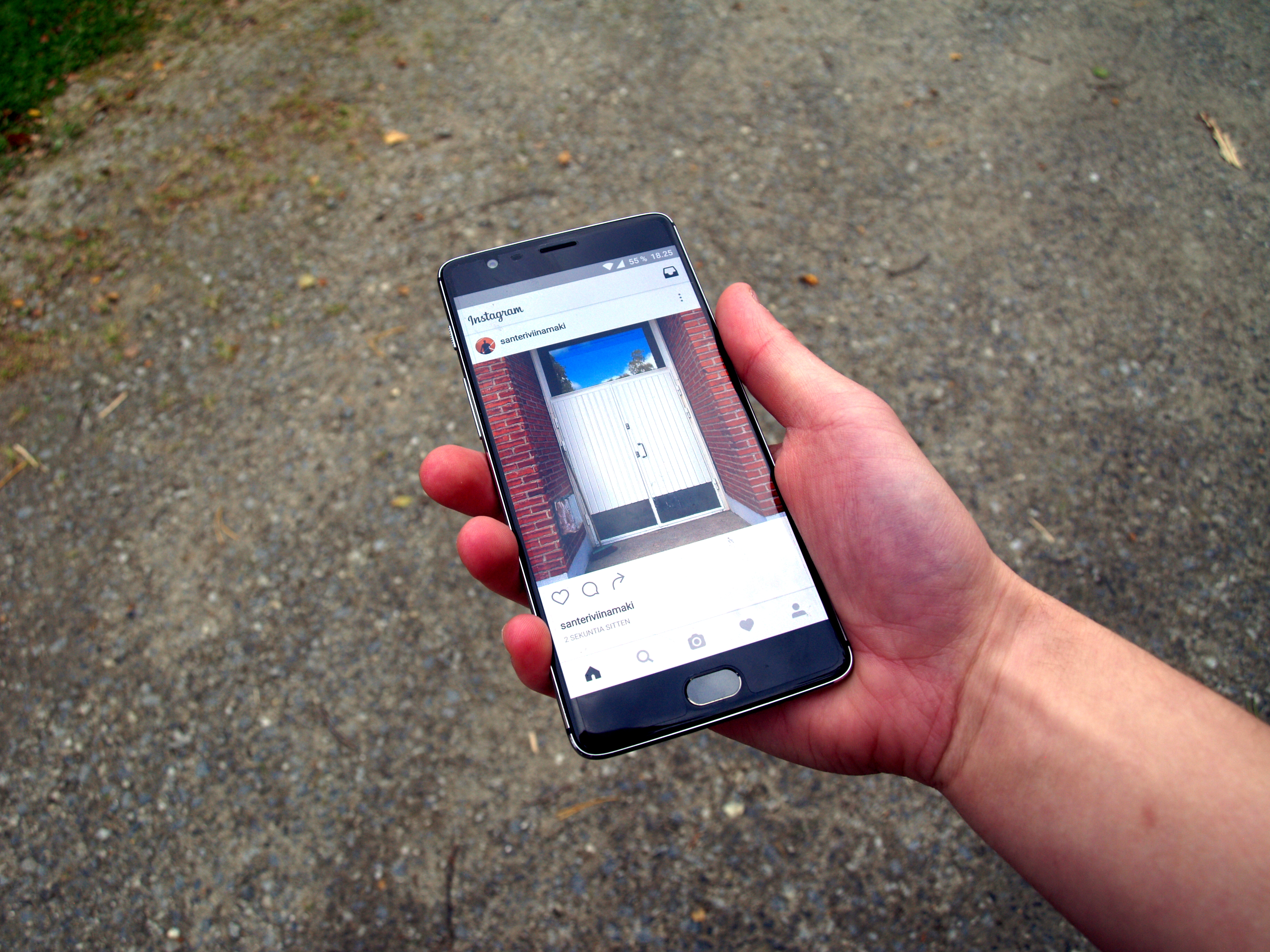
- Photo dumps are most closely associated with Instagram, where users share them as carousel posts.

Overview
- Type: Social media posting trend
- Format: Carousel post of several photos and videos
- Platforms: Instagram, TikTok
- Hashtag: #photodump

History
- Emerged: Summer 2020, during the COVID-19 pandemic
- Popularized by: Bella Hadid, Dua Lipa, Megan Thee Stallion
- Carousel limit: 20 items on Instagram (since 2024); 35 photos on TikTok
- Related: Selfie, Influencer marketing

A photo dump is a social media posting trend where users share a collection of casual, candid, or seemingly random photos in a single carousel post rather than one heavily edited image. Emerging from early photo-sharing practices and expanding rapidly after 2020, this format marks a significant shift in online self-presentation, allowing people to choose a relaxed, imperfect look instead of a perfect one, even though the photos are often picked with care. Today, photo dumps are common on platforms such as Instagram and TikTok, serving as a tool for both personal identity expression and strategic brand marketing.

== Definition and characteristics ==
On Instagram, a photo dump combines several photos or videos into one post instead of presenting only one image. The format generally uses a carousel to group several images or videos together, often with at least four pieces of content. A photo dump can consist of many loosely connected, often unedited images uploaded together after an event, trip, or period of time. Besides photos, a photo dump may also contain short videos, memes, or GIFs. The post is usually paired with a short and casual caption.

Everyday subjects such as food are common in photo dumps.

Photo dumps often mix selfies with everyday subjects such as meals, scenery, and candid moments to create an overall mood. Many of the photos are simple, everyday pictures that would not be interesting enough to post on their own. Although the images may appear random, users can intentionally choose them to create a particular impression or mood.

== History and development ==
When Instagram first became popular, most users posted only one of their best photos at a time. In 2017, Instagram introduced carousel posts, which allowed users to put up to 10 photos or videos into a single swipeable post. InsideHook writer Logan Mahan compared photo dumps to the big Facebook photo albums of the past. She also compared them to the simple, unedited photos that people shared when Instagram first started in 2010.

The modern photo dump trend is often traced back to the summer of 2020, during the COVID-19 pandemic. Because lockdowns limited travel and social events, people's camera rolls filled with everyday scenes such as home cooking, sunsets, and daily walks. Many users became bored with making their profiles look the same and with using filters and editing apps, so they started to post more freely. The casual Instagram trend emphasizes ordinary, imperfect, and spontaneous experiences rather than highly polished scenes. The format allows people to share everyday moments without making every image look perfectly planned or edited.

By mid-2021, Instagram reported that the phrase "photo dump" and the hashtag #photodump had been used more than 700,000 times in the United States in one month. Celebrities such as Bella Hadid, Dua Lipa, and Megan Thee Stallion were also among the users who posted photo dumps.

== Authenticity and self-presentation ==
Internet researcher Crystal Abidin argues that online authenticity can function as something people actively perform through recognizable styles and practices. Research on Instagram authenticity describes practices such as sharing less-edited images, everyday experiences, and candid discussion of personal topics. Users can use photo dumps to present ordinary experiences in a more natural and less polished way.

However, photo dumps are not always as spontaneous as they look. Social media strategist Taylor Loren said that photo dumps try to look random and relaxed, but people usually pick each photo with care. The trend has also been compared to "finstas", which are private second accounts where people post less perfect parts of their lives for close friends only. Photo dumps bring this style to people's main accounts, but the photos are still picked for a bigger audience.

== Cultural impact and psychology ==
Sociologist Nathan Jurgenson's concept of the social photo offers a framework for understanding how photography functions within social media culture. Social media photos can be used to communicate experiences, activities, and moments with other people. By combining and ordering different images, users can communicate a shared feeling or tell a simple story through one post.

Some users said that photo dumps made them feel less pressure to keep their Instagram profile looking perfect. Mahan believes the trend may be a reaction against the pressure to look perfect on Instagram. This pressure can be very hard on young women in particular. Some young users also see their photo dumps as a "digital diary" or personal scrapbook that records a specific period of their lives.

== Photo dumps today ==
In August 2024, Instagram expanded its carousel capacity so users could include as many as 20 photos or videos in one post. This change brought Instagram closer to TikTok, whose carousel format allows up to 35 photos in a single post. Photo dumps have also spread to TikTok through its "photo mode" feature. By 2025, the hashtag #photodump had appeared on more than five million posts.

Brands and businesses also use photo dumps to show new products, give a look behind the scenes, share news, and repost photos from their customers. Each photo in a carousel can be shown to followers more than once while they scroll, so marketers believe photo dumps help more people see and react to their posts. Instagram influencers have to balance appearing genuine with deliberately managing how they communicate with followers.

== See also ==
- Selfie
- Instagram
- Impression management
- Influencer marketing
