= Elizabeth Swados =

American musical theater writer, composer, and director (1951–2016)

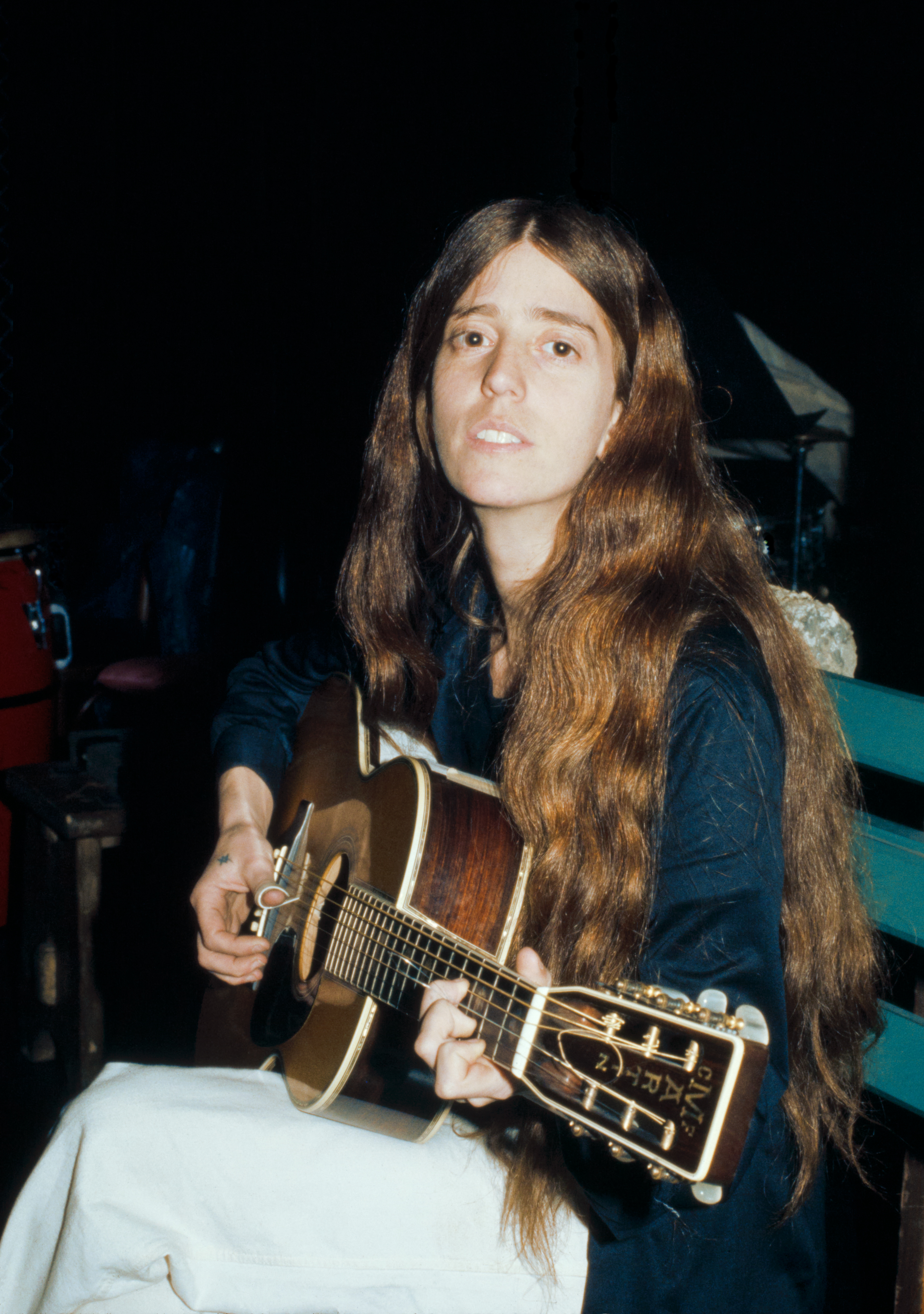
- Swados rehearsing in New York City, 1978

Background information
- Born: February 5, 1951; Buffalo, New York, U.S.
- Died: January 5, 2016 (aged 64) Manhattan, New York City, U.S.
- Occupations: Writer, composer, musician, theatre director

Elizabeth Swados (February 5, 1951 – January 5, 2016) was an American writer, composer, musician, choreographer, and theatre director. Swados received Tony Award nominations for Best Musical, Best Direction of a Musical, Best Book of a Musical, Best Original Score, and Best Choreography. She was nominated for Drama Desk Awards for Outstanding Director of a Musical, Outstanding Lyrics, and Outstanding Music, and won an Obie Award for her direction of Runaways in 1978. In 1980, the Hobart and William Smith Colleges awarded her an honorary doctorate in Humane Letters.

== Life ==
Swados was born on February 5, 1951, in Buffalo, New York. Her father, Robert O. Swados, was a successful attorney who helped Seymour H. Knox III establish the National Hockey League Buffalo Sabres. He was a first cousin of Harvey Swados, a prominent social critic and writer. His autobiography, Counsel in the Crease: A Big League Player in the Hockey Wars, was published by Prometheus Books in 2005. Swados' mother, an actress and poet, struggled with depression, and committed suicide in 1974; Swados' elder brother and only sibling, Lincoln, had schizophrenia, and died in 1989. Swados also had depression, which she discussed in her book, My Depression: A Picture Book, which was published by Seven Stories Press in 2014.

Swados died on January 5, 2016, from complications following surgery early the previous year for esophageal cancer. She was 64.

== Career ==
Swados studied music and creative writing at Bennington College in Vermont, receiving her Bachelor of Arts degree in 1973. While at Bennington, she was introduced by professor Franz Marijnen to Ellen Stewart and became involved with Stewart's La MaMa Experimental Theatre Club in New York City.

Working with Ellen Stewart and Andrei Serban, and with Peter Brook, Swados worked to develop a new sensory language of sound, rhythm, and movement that transcended traditional verbal speech. Swados' musical compositions for Fragments of a Greek Trilogy (Medea, Electra, and Trojan Women) at La MaMa and the Shiraz Arts Festival in Persepolis, Iran, in 1975 and for Peter Brook's Conference of the Birds in the later 1970s laid the groundwork for musical innovation in both American and international theatre.

She was profiled by filmmaker Linda Feferman in the 1977 short documentary The Girl with the Incredible Feeling, a title drawn from a 1975 children's book which she wrote and illustrated. The documentary blends performance footage, home movies, testimonial, and an animated dramatization of the title book, narrated by actor Kenneth McMillan, with her illustrations animated by Carol Ehrlich.

Although many of Swados' works were musicals, her work drew from folk and world music rather than exclusively from musical theatre. Much of her work dealt with issues such as racism, murder, and mental illness.

Her first Broadway success, Runaways, was intended to be a community service piece with a short run. However, after appearing at The Public Theater, the show transferred to Broadway in May 1978. Swados' first musical with Garry Trudeau, Doonesbury, opened on Broadway at the Biltmore Theatre in November 1983. In 1984, Swados composed the music for Garry Trudeau's satirical musical Rap Master Ronnie. In 1985, Swados' musical The Beautiful Lady, concerning the life and works of six Russian poets who lived, composed and performed in St. Petersburg at the time of the Revolution, won the first Helen Hayes "Best New Play" award. Swados also composed music for film (Four Friends, 1981) and television (Seize the Day, 1987), and performed live at Carnegie Hall.

Swados made guest appearances in eleven soap operas, four on ABC Daytime (Loving, All My Children, One Life to Live, and General Hospital), three on NBC Daytime (Days of Our Lives, Another World, and Santa Barbara) and four on CBS Daytime (The Young and the Restless, The Bold and the Beautiful, As the World Turns, and Guiding Light).

She published three novels, three non-fiction books, and nine children's books. Her later books included My Depression: A Picture Book, Sidney's Animal Rescue, and At Play: Teaching Teenagers Theater. My Depression: A Picture Book (2005), was made into an animated short film that was an official selection of the Tribeca Film Festival in 2014. The film includes voices by Sigourney Weaver and Steve Buscemi. In June 2016, Swados' final novel, Walking The Dog, was posthumously published by The Feminist Press. The narrative follows a former child prodigy painter and rich-girl kleptomaniac as she struggles to reintegrate into society following a botched heist which left her incarcerated for two decades. Swados' autobiography, The Four of Us, A Family Memoir, was published by Farrar, Straus and Giroux in 1991.

She was the recipient of a Guggenheim Fellowship, a Ford Fellowship, a Covenant Foundation Grant, an International PEN Citation, a Cine Award, and a Mira Award, among others. She taught in the drama department at New York University's Tisch School of the Arts and at The New School's Eugene Lang College of Liberal Arts as a visiting artist. Her articles were published in The New York Times, The New York Times Magazine, Vogue, O, and numerous other publications.

Shortly after Swados' death in 2016, the actress Diane Lane honored her by establishing a grant for arts educators. The two had a personal connection that dated back to the 1970s. Swados provided the music for Lane's acting debut in Andrei Serban's 1972 production of Medea, and collaborated with the actress again on Runaways.

Runaways was revived in July 2016, after Swados' death, by the New York City Center as a part of its Encores! Off-Center season, a series that explores rarely-revived off-Broadway shows.

In 2020 Ghostlight Records released an album by the name of The Liz Swados Project featuring many of her alt-musical singer/composer heirs to honour her music.

In 2023, Swados' musical The Beautiful Lady was staged Off-Broadway in New York City at La MaMa's Ellen Stewart Theater. It was directed by Anne Bogart using Swados' book with adaptions by Jocelyn Clarke.

== Selected works ==
- Shekhina (1971; La MaMa; written by Leon Katz, directed by Rina Yerushalmi, music by Swados)
- La Celestina, Or, the Spanish Bawd (1971; La MaMa; adapted and directed by Steve Abrams, music by Swados)
- Medea (1972; La MaMa; conceived and directed by Andrei Serban, music by Swados)
- Fragments of a Trilogy/Trilogy/Trojan Women (1974; La MaMa; directed by Serban, music by Swados)
- Crow (1974; La MaMa; based on Ted Hughes' poems; composed, conceived, and directed by Serban and Swados; performed by Earle Gister's drama students from Carnegie Mellon University)
- Jilsa (1974; La MaMa; written by Oh Tae-Suk, directed by Duk-Hyung Yoo, music by Swados)
- The Good Woman of Setzuan (1975; La MaMa; adapted from Bertolt Brecht; directed by Serban, music by Swados)
- Jumpin's Salty (1975; Westbeth Playwrights Feminist Collective; music by Swados, lyrics by Eve Merriman)
- Nightclub Cantata (1977; Village Gate; based on texts by Sylvia Plath, Pablo Neruda, and other poets)
- Runaways (1978; Obie Award)
- Dispatches, a Rock & Roll War (1979)
- As You Like It (1980; La MaMa; written by William Shakespeare; directed by Serban, music by Swados)
- Alice in Concert (1980)
- The Haggadah, a Passover Cantata (1980)
- The Three Travels of Aladin with the Magic Lamp (1982; La MaMa; conceived and directed by Francoise Grund, music by Swados)
- Enter Life (1982; animated film; directed by Faith Hubley, music by Swados)
- Lullabye and Goodnight (1982)
- Doonesbury: A Musical Comedy (1983; music by Swados, lyrics by Garry Trudeau)
- The Killing Floor (1984; television film)
- Rap Master Ronnie (1984; music by Swados, lyrics by Garry Trudeau)
- Jerusalem (1983/1984; La MaMa; poetry by Yehuda Amichai; composed and adapted by Swados)
- Mythos Oedipus (1985; La MaMa; directed by Ellen Stewart, music by Swados)
- Religious Revelry - Esther: A Vaudeville Megillah (1988; Mosaic Theatre at the 92nd Street Y; narration based on Elie Wiesel's Purim lecture "Beauty and Commitment"; written, composed, and directed by Swados)
- The Red Sneaks (1989)
- Jonah (1990)
- Groundhog (1992)
- Conscience and Courage Cantata (1994)
- Jabu (2005)
- The Beauty Inside (2005)
- Missionaries in Concert (2005)
- Mental Missiles (2006)
- Spider Opera (2006)
- Kaspar Hauser: A Foundling's Opera (2009; Flea Theater)
- The Great Divorce (2007)
- Books Cook (2010; Atlantic Theater Company; conceived, composed, and directed by Swados)
- Resilient Souls (2010)
- Occupy Olympus (2013)
- *mark (2014)
- My Depression (The Up and Down and Up of It) (2014; animated film)
- The Nomad (2015)
- The Golem (2015)

== Selected bibliography ==
- Swados. Listening Out Loud: Becoming a Composer. New York: Harper & Row, 1988. ISBN 9780060159924
- Swados. The Four of Us: The Story of a Family. New York: Farrar, Straus, and Giroux, 1991. ISBN 9780374152192
- Swados and Joe Cepeda. Hey You! C'mere!: A Poetry Slam. New York: Arthur A. Levine Books, 2002. ISBN 9780439092579
- Swados and Anne Wilson. The Animal Rescue Store. New York: Arthur A. Levine Books, 2005. ISBN 9780439554763
- Swados. My Depression: A Picture Book. New York: Hyperion, 2005. ISBN 9781401307899
- Swados. Walking the Dog. New York: The Feminist Press, 2016. ISBN 9781558619210
