= The Song of Everlasting Sorrow (novel) =

1995 Chinese novel by Wang Anyi

- cover of the English translation published by Columbia University Press
- Author: Wang Anyi
- Translator: Michael Berry & Susan Chan Egan (2008)
- Language: Chinese
- Set in: Shanghai, 1945–1986
- Published: 1995, Writers Publishing House
- Publication place: China

Chinese name
- Traditional Chinese: 長恨歌
- Simplified Chinese: 长恨歌
Transcriptions
Standard Mandarin
- Hanyu Pinyin: Cháng hèn gē

The Song of Everlasting Sorrow is a novel written by Chinese author Wang Anyi. Widely considered to be one of her best works, this story follows the life and romantic encounters of a woman in a changing Shanghai, spanning roughly four decades of the twentieth century.

The Song of Everlasting Sorrow was adapted into a 2005 film titled Everlasting Regret, and a 2006 TV series titled To Live to Love.

== English translation ==
The novel was translated into English in 2008 by Michael Berry and Susan Chan Egan for Columbia University Press.

The novel has also been translated into Vietnamese by Sơn Lê (as Trường hận ca), into Korean by Yu Byeong-rye (as 장한가), into French by Yvonne André and Stéphane Lévêque (as Le chant des regrets éternels), into Spanish by Carlos Ossés Torrón (as La canción de la pena eterna), into Italian by Maria Rita Masci (as La canzone dell'eterno rimpianto), into Russian by Maria V. Semenyuk (as Песнь о бесконечной тоске) and into Serbian by Ivana Elezović (as Pesma o večnoj seti).

== History ==
The novel has the same name as the poem written by one of the most famous poets in the Tang Dynasty, Bai Juyi, about the romance and tragic death of the beautiful imperial consort Yang Yuhuan. This novel was initially published in instalments in the 1995 issue of Zhong shan magazine and was soon after published as a novel. Initially, the novel did not arouse much interest in the public until it was awarded the prestigious Mao Dun Literature Prize in 2000. After this recognition, the novel received further awards and saw an increase in sales and popularity across China. Despite many literary critics identifying Wang's novel with a wave of nostalgia that China experienced, she denies having written the novel with a sentimentality for Old Shanghai in mind, stating that she "has simply used Old Shanghai as a literary resource, as a setting for the plot and as a means to imbue the plot with a certain dramatic intensity". In a 1996 article published in Du shu magazine, scholar Wang Dewei proclaimed Wang Anyi the literary successor of Eileen Chang, as he drew parallels between the novel and Chang's work. Regarding this comparison, Wang acknowledged that they both "share an interest in the minutiae of everyday life", but feels that she herself focuses more on social realities, while Chang moves between reality and the illusory world "in an almost nihilistic way".

== Plot ==
Wang Anyi’s The Song of Everlasting Sorrow tells the story of a gorgeous Shanghai woman named Wang Qiyao. The timeline of the novel spans from 1946 to 1986, and is separated into three parts. Everything begins with the title of “Miss Shanghai”. After being discovered by an amateur photographer, Wang Qiyao competes in the 1946 Miss Shanghai beauty pageant. She becomes the second runner-up and is awarded the title "Miss Third Place", marking a moment of stardom in her life that she clings to for the following years after. Starting with Director Li, Wang Qiyao experiences several romantic, yet fleeting relationships throughout her life. When she is middle-aged, Wang Qiyao falls in love with a 26 year old young man called “Old Colour”, but their relationship eventually comes to an end despite Wang Qiyao's desperation to hold on to it. In the end she is murdered by the scam artist “Long Legs” because of his desire to steal her hidden stash of gold bars. Wang Qiyao's final moments seem to echo a similar scene from her youth.

== Characters ==
- Wang Qiyao (simplified Chinese: 王琦瑶; traditional Chinese: 王琦瑤; pinyin: Wáng Qíyáo) is the tragic heroine of the novel. She was born in Shanghai in around 1930. A young beauty obsessed with the glitz and glamour of Hollywood, Wang entered the 1946 "Miss Shanghai" pageant, winning third place, which marked the pinnacle of her life. Over the next four decades, Wang struggled furtively to cling to that glorious moment, all the while carrying on numerous fleeting and largely secretive romances. Her sexual partners included one (Director Li) more than twice her age and one ("Old Colour") less than half her age. However, Wang was never able to maintain any romantic relationship or non-romantic friendship, just as she failed to bond with her own parents and daughter (Weiwei). Wang was murdered in 1986 by a scam artist ("Long Legs") whom she had befriended.
- Wu Peizhen (simplified Chinese: 吴佩珍; traditional Chinese: 吳佩珍; pinyin: Wú Pèizhēn) was once Wang Qiyao's best friend in high school. She was ugly and had no friend besides Wang, so she did everything to please Wang, including taking Wang to a film set where her cousin worked. They visited the set many times, but after Wang's failed screen test their relationship inexplicably cooled largely due to Wang's oversensitiveness. Despite that, Wu's affection towards Wang remained basically unchanged. During her last visit to see Wang in 1948 (on the eve of the Shanghai Campaign), she announced that she had married an affluent man and offered to take Wang with her family to Hong Kong. Wang was very touched but refused. That was their last encounter.
- Mr. Cheng was an amateur photographer who became infatuated with Wang Qiyao after photographing her in his apartment in 1945. An exceedingly nice but shy man, Cheng was too afraid to confess his love for Wang, and Wang thought of him only as a "last resort". Jiang Lili, however, fell for him, but their relationship went nowhere as he wasn't able to get over Wang. In the early 1960s, Cheng took care of Wang and her newborn dutifully like he was the new father. Wang was ready to accept him in her life, but Cheng was afraid of making a move and stopped visiting Wang. In 1966 during the Cultural Revolution, Cheng was accused of being a "capitalist roader" and was locked up by Red Guards for a month, after which he committed suicide by jumping from his studio on the Bund. He was 44.
- Jiang Lili (simplified Chinese: 蒋丽莉; traditional Chinese: 蔣麗莉; pinyin: Jiǎng Lìlì) was Wang Qiyao's best friend in high school after Wang's fall out with Wu Peizhen. A romantic and idealist, Jiang was sentimental and socially awkward. Her father and younger brother were barely in her life, and she disliked her mother, her eventual husband Mr. Zhang, his rural family, and even their 3 sons who resembled her husband too much. The only 2 people she ever liked were Wang and Cheng, but due to their complicated love triangle, their relationships brought her nothing more than sorrow. After the Chinese Communist Revolution, she turned her devotion to the Chinese Communist Party, but was denied membership because of her "bourgeois" background. In 1965, liver cancer ended her unhappy and unfulfilled life.
- Director Li was an influential person in the Kuomintang National Revolutionary Army. He saw Wang Qiyao first during the "Miss Shanghai" pageant and later at a banquet, and although not instantly enamoured, found her interesting. After a few meals together, he rented out a place for her in the luxurious Alice Apartments, essentially claiming her as his mistress (he already had 3 wives). With the Chinese Civil War raging on, Li was extremely busy and rarely in Shanghai, but they truly loved each other in spite of a large age difference. In 1948, his spirits became increasingly despondent after successive military defeats. Knowing the inevitability of a Communist victory, he cautioned Wang to never acknowledge their relationship and left her a few gold bars for the future. He died in a plane crash that year.
- "Deuce" (Chinese: 阿二) was the second son of a tofu supplier in Wu Bridge (邬桥, at that time a rural town, now in Fengxian District, Shanghai). A graduate of a Kunshan school, "Deuce" planned to attend college in Nanjing but was stuck in Wu Bridge due to the 1949 Communist Revolution. He looked down on the rustic Wu Bridge natives. When Wang Qiyao arrived, her different demeanour and Shanghai background filled his heart with imagination and desire. He treated Wang like an idol, visited her often and brought her books to read. Although Wang regarded his affection as merely puppy love, "Deuce" was convinced that if he worked hard he would be good enough for her hand one day, and hurriedly departed for Shanghai to realize this dream. He wasn't heard from since.
- Madame Yan was a housewife in Peace Lane, where Wang Qiyao moved into in the 1950s. She had led a luxurious life because Mr. Yan had owned a factory before the Communist Revolution. Madame Yan had little responsibility at home, so she visited Wang often as they both enjoyed clothes and fashion. She introduced Wang to her cousin Kang Mingxun, and the trio frequently played mahjong during the Anti-Rightist Movement (1957–1959) along with Sasha. Madame Yan thought Wang had been a taxi dancer, and viewed her with both jealousy and disdain, so their friendship was never extremely close. When she discovered Wang's relationship with Kang, she informed Kang's family, after which she fell out with Wang. However, she attended the wedding of Wang's daughter Weiwei in 1984.
- Kang Mingxun (simplified Chinese: 康明逊; traditional Chinese: 康明遜; pinyin: Kāng Míngxùn) was a cousin of Madame Yan. A jobless college graduate, he lived off his wealthy father. The son of a concubine, he had to call his father's principal wife "Mother" and his biological mother "Second Mother" per strict family rules. Kang was thus keenly aware of the familial pressure on him. When he fell in love with Wang, a woman with a questionable past, he knew their romance would be forbidden. Still they consummated their love, and Wang became pregnant. Wang tried to resolve the issue by sleeping with Sasha and blaming him for the pregnancy, so as to relieve Kang of his responsibility. Kang visited Wang a few times after the childbirth, even resumed their lovemaking, but there was no more love. Soon he dropped off from Wang's life.
- Sasha (simplified Chinese: 萨沙; traditional Chinese: 薩沙, Russian: Сáша) was of both Chinese and Russian parentage. After his father's death, his Russian mother returned to the Soviet Union and remarried. Without a family or a job, Sasha wandered aimlessly, hanging out with both Chinese and Russians to fill his emptiness. He befriended Kang Mingxun from playing contract bridge, and came with him to Wang Qiyao's apartment for mahjong, almost always empty-handed. After Wang was impregnated by Kang in 1961, she decided to claim Sasha the father due to his special status as "Heir of the Revolution", so she began to have sex with him even though there was no love between them. Soon after discovering her pregnancy, Sasha went to Beijing ostensibly to meet his Russian aunt, never to return.
- Weiwei (Chinese: 薇薇; pinyin: Wēiwēi) was the illegitimate daughter of Wang Qiyao, born in 1961. Her father was Kang Mingxun, who was not part of her life. Instead, Weiwei was told that her father had died in Siberia, and it didn't bother her much. Weiwei grew up in her mother's shadow and always felt inadequate, constantly wary that Wang Qiyao would steal her thunder and even boyfriend. With the end of the Cultural Revolution in 1976 and the beginning of the reform and opening up in 1978, Weiwei closely followed fashion changes so as to outshine her mother, whom she often argued with except when she needed money. Aside from fashion, Weiwei had few pursuits in life. She got married in 1984, and a year later joined her husband in America.
- Zhang Yonghong (simplified Chinese: 张永红; traditional Chinese: 張永紅; pinyin: Zhāng Yǒnghóng) was Weiwei's former classmate and best friend. From a poor family with a tubercular mother and older sister, Zhang was anorexic yet very pretty. She also possessed a great sense of fashion, and it was fashion that she frequently discussed with Wang Qiyao. Suffering from low-esteem in spite of many pursuers, she changed boyfriends fast, never committing herself to any of them. Once she reached marriage age she intended to marry someone rich so that she would no longer remain in poverty. For this reason she stuck with "Long Legs", who spent money on her like nobody's business—completely unaware that he was a scam artist even poorer than her.
- "Old Colour" (simplified Chinese: 老克腊; traditional Chinese: 老克臘; pinyin: Lǎo Kèlà; Shanghainese: Lau^{2} Kheh^{4} Lah^{4}) was a gym teacher who interested himself in older things, especially the "old Shanghai" before 1949. Before Wang Qiyao, he never had a girlfriend, spending most of his free time on old jazz records or on the roof alone. That changed when he met Wang, who exuded a nostalgic air he found irresistible. He began frequenting her apartment to learn about the past. When they finally had sex, he was 26, and she around 55. It was then that "Old Colour" realized he did not love Wang—his obsession with the past was just a manifestation of loneliness—but Wang desperately wanted to hold on to him. Her pleading backfired, and "Old Colour"—who was afraid of commitment—left her for good.
- "Long Legs" (simplified Chinese: 长脚; traditional Chinese: 長腳) was Zhang Yonghong's last stable boyfriend. He lived in the slum with his migrant family and exchanged currencies on the black market for profit, mostly at night. Despite his destitution, he posed as someone from a millionaire household, frequently footing bills for others and buying expensive gifts for Zhang and Wang Qiyao. A skilled con artist, he lied about almost everything with much success—for a time. His spending habits obviously unsustainable, "Long Legs" began cheating his clients, and eventually murdered Wang in 1986 when she exposed him during a bungled burglary. Wang was the only one suspecting his double-life as Zhang, described as relatively worldly-wise, knew nothing about him and even believed him marriage material.

== Awards ==
- 1998 4th Shanghai Literary and Art Award
- 1999 Top 100 Works of Chinese Fiction in the 20th century (39th) — list published by Yazhou Zhoukan
- 1999 Top 10 Books of the 1990s — list published by China Times
- 2000 10 Most Influential Works of the 1990s — list published by Wenhui Bao
- 2000 5th Mao Dun Literature Prize

In addition, the English translation was awarded Honorable Mention at the 6th Lois Roth Award (for translation of a literary work) in 2009 by the Modern Language Association.

== Adaptations ==
- Everlasting Regret, a 2005 film directed by Stanley Kwan, starring Sammi Cheng as Wang Qiyao and main actors Tony Leung, Daniel Wu, Jun Hu...
- To Live to Love, a 2006 TV series directed by Ding Hei, starring Huang Yi (who portrayed Weiwei in the film version) as the younger Wang Qiyao, and Maggie Cheung Ho-yee as the older Wang Qiyao

Both adaptations differ significantly from the original, especially the film version. In both versions, Mr. Cheng survived the Cultural Revolution and figured prominently in Wang Qiyao's later life.

As early as 2003, the novel was also adapted for stage by Zhao Yaomin (who later co-wrote the teleplay for To Live to Love). The first performance at the Shanghai Drama Art Center starred Zhang Lu as Wang Qiyao.
