= Time lapse (disambiguation) =

Time-lapse photography is a film technique.

Time lapse may also refer to:

- Time-lapse microscopy, a type of microscopy
- Time-lapse phonography, an audio signal processing technique

== Media ==
=== Film and television ===
- Time Lapse (2014 film), a 2014 science-fiction thriller
- Timelapse (TV series), a 1980 Australian TV series
- Timelapse of the Entire Universe, 2018 short film by John Boswell
- Timelapse of the Future, 2019 short film by John Boswell
- "Time Lapse" (The Twilight Zone), a television episode

=== Music ===
- Time Lapse (album), 1992, by Steve Hackett
- Time-Lapse, a 2023 album by Yukika Teramoto
- "Time Lapse", a 2013 song by Ludovico Einaudi from In a Time Lapse
- "Time Lapse", a 2015 song by TheFatRat
- "Time Lapse", a 2022 song by NCT 127 from 2 Baddies
- "Time Lapse", a song from the soundtrack of the 1985 film A Zed & Two Noughts

== Other uses ==
- Timelapse (video game)
