= Mo Fan =

Chinese composer

Mo Fan (Chinese: 莫凡; born in May 1949, Hangzhou, China) is a Chinese composer. During the Cultural Revolution he was sent to Heilongjiang, where he taught himself composition. In 1979 he entered Shanghai Conservatory.

== Works ==
- Thunderstorm.
- Pipa concerto – Changhen ge "Ballad of the Eternal Sorrow" – for soprano, pipa, flute and orchestra 1991

== Selected recordings ==
- "Waterscape Silhouette" piao 《漂》– for pipa on recital by UK Chinese ensemble The Silk String Quartet - Contemporary and Traditional Chinese Music ARC Music 2007
