= Wang Anyi =

Chinese writer (born 1954)

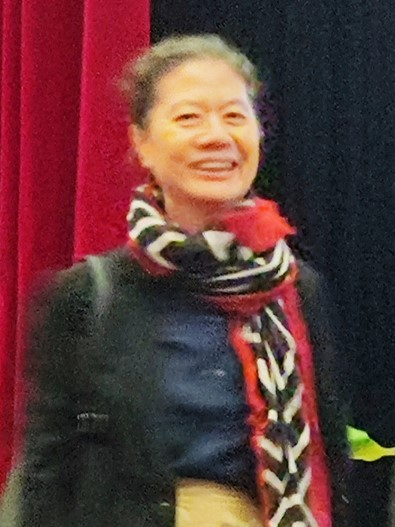
- Born: March 6, 1954 (age 72); Nanjing, Jiangsu, China
- Spouse: Li Zhang (李章)
- Relatives: Ru Zhijuan, mother; Wang Xiaoping, father
- Writing career
- Language: Chinese
- Period: 1975–present
- Genres: fiction, prose
- Notable work: The Song of Everlasting Sorrow (1995)
- Movement: Xungen movement

Chinese name
- Traditional Chinese: 王安憶
- Simplified Chinese: 王安忆
Transcriptions
Standard Mandarin
- Hanyu Pinyin: Wáng Ānyì

Wang Anyi (born 6 March 1954) is a Chinese writer, vice-chair of the China Writers Association since 2006, and professor in Chinese Literature at Fudan University since 2004.

Wang widely writes novels, novellas, short stories and essays with diverse themes and topics. The majority of her works are set in Shanghai, where she lived and worked for the majority of her life. Wang also regularly writes about the countryside in Anhui, where she was "sent down" during the Cultural Revolution. Her works have been translated into English, German and French, and studied as zhiqing (educated youth), xungen (roots-searching), Haipai (Shanghai style), and dushi (urban, cosmopolitan) literature.

== Early life ==
Wang was born in Nanjing in 1954, but moved to Shanghai with her mother when she was a year old. Her mother was the prominent writer Ru Zhijuan. Under the influence of her parents, she liked literature very much in childhood. After the Cultural Revolution, her parents were sent to labor camps. She read a large number of foreign works, Including Turgenev, Tolstoy, Gorky, Pushkin, Tazma and other writers classic works.

== Career ==
In 1969, after graduating from middle school, Wang was "sent down" to the countryside of Wuhe County, Anhui—then an impoverished province plagued by famine. The rustication experience traumatized her. In the late 1980s, Wang said: "When I left, I left with the feelings of escaping from hell."

During the lonely years in the countryside, "reading books and writing in my diary became even more precious to me". Wang had hoped to enter a university as a Worker-Peasant-Soldier student but without a recommendation, her dream was not realized. However, as she could play the accordion, in 1972 she found a position in the Xuzhou Song and Dance Cultural Troupe to play the cello. During her spare time she continued to write, and began to publish short stories in 1976. She was permitted to return to Shanghai in 1978 and worked as an editor of the literature magazine Childhood (儿童时代).

In 1980 Wang became a professional writer, and that year received training from the China Writers Association at the Lu Xun Literary Institute. In the same year, her first reputed work -- "And the Rain Patters On" won the Beijing Literature Prize, which started her fictionalized self—Wenwen (雯雯) series stories. Her earlier works focused on individual experiences rather than the collective, politics-oriented literature advocated by the state. Her biographical stories portray emotionally-charged coming-of-age experiences of political frustrations, youthful yearnings, and the development of the private self in the context of socialist revolution. In 1982 and 1983, her short story "The Destination" and novella Lapse of Time won national awards. In Lapse of Time, Wang shifted from emotional intensity in her previous work to the mundane day-to-day lives.

A 1983 trip to Iowa City, Iowa, United States for the International Writing Program, with her mother Ru Zhijuan, redefined her career. There she met writer Chen Yingzhen, a social activist and Chinese nationalist from Taiwan, whose humanistic worldview and encouragement strongly influenced her. This experience "led to the profound discovery that she was indeed Chinese and to the decision to 'write on China' when she returned". In her first major work after the trip, the award-winning novella Baotown (1985), Wang focused on the culture of rural China, drawing from her own experience. The benevolent child protagonist is contrasted with selfish, prejudicial, cruel and close-minded adult villagers, and Ying Hong remarked that Wang used "words that carry not the least hint of subjectivity she casually tosses forth a whole string of 'slices of life'."

Since Baotown, Wang began exploring social taboo subjects. Her three novellas on forbidden carnal love, namely Love on a Barren Mountain (1986), Love in a Small Town (1986), and Brocade Valley (1987), provoked much controversy despite virtually no depictions of sex. Her 1989 novella Brothers made forays into the fragile same-sex, non-sexual female bond. However, in a 1988 interview, Wang stated her "purpose and theme" have been consistently about man and love.

During 1990s, the literal technics of Wang have been more skilled, and her works "not only reveal social relationships, but some of the basic attributes (natural attributes) of people and their profound constraining power over the fate of individuals." In 1996, Wang's most famous novel, The Song of Everlasting Sorrow, traces the life story of a young Shanghainese girl from the 1940s all the way till her death after the Cultural Revolution. The novel made Wang's writing reached its peak, and won the most prestigious Mao Dun Literary Prize in 2000 in China. In the story, the protagonist Wang Qiyao "is a metaphor for Shanghai: she maintains her pride and her manners, despite her misery under communist rule." The novel was adapted into a film in 2005, a television series, and a stage play. The success of The Song of Everlasting Sorrow earned the reputation of Wang as the successor of Eileen Chang, and both of their writings are about the civil lives in Shanghai, which are known as Haipai (Shanghai School).

A novella and six of her stories have been translated and collected in an anthology, Lapse of Time. In his preface to that collection, Jeffrey Kinkley notes that Wang is a realist whose stories "are about everyday urban life" and that the author "does not stint in describing the brutalising density, the rude jostling, the interminable and often futile waiting in line that accompany life in the Chinese big city".

Wang has tried other forms of writing. In 1996 Wang co-wrote the period film Temptress Moon with director Chen Kaige and Shu Kei. In 2007, she translated Elizabeth Swados' My Depression: A Picture Book from English.

Wang has been a professor at Fudan University since 2000s.

== Narrative style ==
Wang likes to combine history with current facts to create, and integrate historical culture into the narrative of the novel. "The Song of Everlasting Sorrow" is actually a poem written by Bai Juyi, a poet in the Tang dynasty, about the love between Tang Xuanzong and Concubine Yang. Based on a piece of real news and ancient history, Wang Anyi unfolded another kind of love story, cleverly combining current knowledge and history. On the other hand, Wang Anyi is good at narrative methods that see the 'big' from the 'small'. From "Song of Everlasting Regret" to "Kao Gong Ji", she reflects the changes in society and the times through the description of characters.

Hong Zicheng commented that "Among women writers, Wang Anyi is seen as a writer with an exceptionally wide field of vision and the ability to harness many forms of life experience and literary subject matter." The cultural critic, Dai Jinhua, remarked on her literary creation after Wang won the 2017 Newman Prize for Chinese Literature, "Wang Anyi is a good at capturing the miniature drama of mundane lives ... Her world is a gallery of humans, in which you encounter China, the world, and the river of life that is enduring and sublime, yielding yet constantly invigorated ... She does not write about ordinary people in a general sense; she writes about laborers, and the daily lives of those laborers, regarding their love, fear, life, and death."

Throughout her writing career, Wang transitioned from experience-based writing to more strategic narration. In a 1991 interview, she claimed that her early works only described scenes, without the narrator's presence. Late on, she transitioned from objective narration to more subjective narration. Wang is often recognized as a feminist writer, although she does not self-identify as a feminist. "Critics often says that I am under the influence of feminism. They say I am disappointed in man, which I am not." She says in the same interview, however, that she "cannot treat women as objects" and she "dislikes female characters that does everything to please men."

== Personal life ==
Wang's mother, Ru Zhijuan (茹志鹃), is a novelist while her father, Wang Xiaopin (王啸平), is a playwright and director. She has an elder sister, Wang Annuo (王安诺), who is a former editor of a literary magazine and a younger brother, Wang Anwei (王安桅), who does Literary and Art research.

Wang is married to Li Zhang (李章) who is an editor of Shanghai Music Publishing House.

== Works translated into English ==
Year	Chinese title	Translated English title	Translator(s)
1979	雨，沙沙沙	"And the Rain Patters On"	Michael Day
1980	小院琐记	"Life in a Small Courtyard"	Hu Zhihui
1981	墙基	"The Base of the Wall"	Daniel Bryant
1981	朋友	"Friends"	Nancy Lee
1981	本次列车终点	"The Destination"	Yu Fanqin
1982	流逝	Lapse of Time	Howard Goldblatt
1982	舞台小世界	"The Stage, a Miniature World"	Song Shouquan
1984	人人之间	"Between Themselves"	Gladys Yang
1984	话说老秉	"Speaking of Old Bing"	Chad Phelan
1985	我为什么写作	"Why I Write"	Michael Berry
1985	小鲍庄	Baotown	Martha Avery
1985	母亲	"Mother"	Todd Foley
1985	老康回来	"Lao Kang Came Back"	Jeanne Tai
1985	老康回来	"Lao Kang Is Back"	Denis C. Mair
1985	阿跷传略	"The Story of Ah Qiao"	Yawtsong Lee
1986	阿芳的灯	"Ah Fang's Light"	Yawtsong Lee
1986	鸠雀一战	"The Nest Fight"	Yawtsong Lee
1986	鸠雀一战	"Ah Fang's Lamp"	Helen Wang
1986	鸠雀一战	"Birds Fighting for a Nest"	Nigel Bedford
1986	名旦之口	"The Mouth of the Famous Female Impersonator"	Zhu Zhiyu, Janice Wickeri
1986	荒山之恋	Love on a Barren Mountain	Eva Hung
1986	小城之恋	Love in a Small Town	Eva Hung
1987	锦绣谷之恋	Brocade Valley	Bonnie S. McDougall, Chen Maiping
1987	面对自己	"Needed: A Spirit of Courageous Self-Examination"	Ellen Lai-shan Yeung
1988	女作家的自我	"A Woman Writer's Sense of Self"	Wang Lingzhen, Mary Ann O'Donnell
1989	弟兄们	"Brothers"	Diana B. Kingsbury
1989	弟兄们	"Brothers"	Jingyuan Zhang
1991	妙妙	"Miaomiao"	Don J. Cohn
1991	乌托邦诗篇	"Utopian Verses"	Wang Lingzhen, Mary Ann O'Donnell
1995	长恨歌	The Song of Everlasting Sorrow	Michael Berry, Susan Chan Egan
1996	姊妹们	"Sisters"	Ihor Pidhainy, Xiao-miao Lan
1996	我爱比尔	"I Love Bill" (excerpt)	Todd Foley
1997	文工团	"The Troupe" (excerpt)	Todd Foley
1998	忧伤的年代	"Years of Sadness"	Wang Lingzhen, Mary Ann O'Donnell
1998	丧钟为谁而鸣	"For Whom the Bell Tolls"	Gao Jin
1998	天仙配	"Match Made in Heaven"	Todd Foley
1998	遗民	"Inhabitants of a Vintage Era"	Yawtsong Lee
1998	大学生	"The Grand Student"	Yawtsong Lee
1998	小饭店	"The Little Restaurant"	Yawtsong Lee
1999	喜宴	"Wedding Banquet"	Yuvonne Yee
1999	喜宴	"A Nuptial Banquet"	Yawtsong Lee
1999	开会	"The Meeting"	Yawtsong Lee
1999	花园的小红	"Xiao Hong of the Village of Huayuan"	Yawtsong Lee
1999	花园的小红	"Little Rouge of the Garden Village"	Wang Mingjie
1999	街灯底下	"Under the Street Lights"	Shin Yong Robson
1999	艺人之死	"The Death of an Artist"	Hu Ying
2000	王汉芳	"Wang Hanfang"	Hu Ying
2000	富萍	Fu Ping	Howard Goldblatt
2001	民工刘建华	"Liu Jianhua the Migrant Worker"	Sylvia Yu, Benjamin Chang, Chris Malone
2002	投我以木桃，报之以琼瑶	"A Peach Was Presented Me, I Returned a Fine Jade"	Gao Jin
2002	云低处	"In the Belly of the Fog"	Canaan Morse
2002	闺中	"Maiden Days in the Boudoir"	Wang Zhiguang
2003	姊妹行	"A Girls' Trip"	Todd Foley
2003	发廊情话	"Confidences in a Hair Salon"	Shi Xiaojing
2003	发廊情话	"Love Talk at Hairdresser's"	Hui L. Glennie, John R. Glennie
2007	救命车	"The Rescue Truck"	Todd Foley
2008	黑弄堂	"The Dark Alley"	Canaan Morse
2008	骄傲的皮匠	"The Sanctimonious Cobbler"	Andrea Lingenfelter

== Major awards ==
- 1982: 4th National Short Story Prize, "The Destination"
- 1983: 2nd National Novella Prize, Lapse of Time
- 1987: 4th National Novella Prize, Baotown
- 2000: 5th Mao Dun Literature Prize, The Song of Everlasting Sorrow
- 2004: 3rd Lu Xun Literary Prize, "Confidences in a Hair Salon"
- 2012: 4th Dream of the Red Chamber Award, Scent of Heaven (天香)
- 2013: France's Ordre des Arts et des Lettres
- 2017: 5th Newman Prize for Chinese Literature
- 2018: 2nd JD Literature Prize, "红豆生南国"
