= Helen Schnabel =

- Born: Helen Fogel; July 22, 1911; New York, U.S.
- Died: September 29, 1974 (aged 63) Lake Como, Italy
- Occupation(s): pianist, piano teacher
- Instrument: piano
- Years active: 1920–1974
- Spouse: Karl Ulrich Schnabel

Helen Schnabel, née Fogel, (July 22, 1911 – September 29, 1974) was an American pianist. She was married to the pianist Karl Ulrich Schnabel.

== Biography ==
Helen Fogel was born in New York City and grew up in the Bronx. She made her debut at Carnegie Hall when she was nine. Over the next few years, she performed on radio and gave recitals in New York. When she was 21 she graduated from the Juilliard School, where her teachers included Manfred Malkin and Alexander Siloti.

Between 1934 and 1938 she studied under Artur Schnabel at Tremezzo, on Lake Como in Italy. There she met the son of Therese Behr-Schnabel and Artur, Karl Ulrich Schnabel, whom she married in 1939; their daughter Ann was born in 1941.

The couple started the four-hands ensemble Piano Duo Schnabel. They performed on radio and gave recitals in Canada and the United States and, after the end of the Second World War, in Europe. They gave five concerts with orchestra at the Holland Festival in 1956, played at the Edinburgh Festival in 1972 and, from 1948, taught master classes at Tremezzo in summer.

Helen Schnabel also performed as a soloist. From 1940, she taught at the Dalcroze School of Music in New York. She died of cancer at Lake Como in 1974.

== Discography ==
=== Piano solo ===
- Artur Schnabel: Concerto for Piano and Orchestra (Intermezzo and Rondo), F. Charles Adler, conductor, Vienna Orchestra; Seven Piano Pieces; Reverie; Songs, Erika Francoulon, Soprano. Helen Schnabel Plays Artur Schnabel (CD: TownHall Records THCD-65)
- Beethoven: Concerto for Piano and Orchestra, Op. 61a — F. Charles Adler, Conductor, Vienna Orchestra; Weber: Sonata in E minor, Op. 70, No. 4; Malipiero: Poemi Asolani. Helen Schnabel Plays Beethoven, Weber, and Malipiero (CD: TownHall Records THCD-66)
- Bach, C. P. E.: Piano Concerto in D major. Vienna Philharmonia Orchestra. F. Charles Adler, conductor. Trio for Flute, Violin and Piano. Camillo Wanausek, Flute; Walter Schneiderhahn, Violin; Helen Schnabel, Piano. (LP: SPA Records, SPA-37)
- Beethoven: Concerto for Piano and Orchestra D major, Op. 61a. Vienna Orchestra. F. Charles Adler, conductor. (LP: SPA Records, SPA-45)
- Beethoven: Concerto for Piano and Orchestra, Op. 61a. Vienna Orchestra. F. Charles Adler, conductor. (CD: Somerset Recordings, SCD 10001)
- Weber: Sonata in E minor, Op. 70, No. 4. Malipiero: Poemi Asolani. (LP: SPA Records, SPA-15)
- Schnabel, Artur: Seven Piano Pieces; Reverie. Piece in Seven Movements. Dika Newlin, piano. (LP: SPA Records, SPA-13)
- Schnabel, Artur: Concerto for Piano and Orchestra. Vienna Orchestra, F. Charles Adler, conductor. (LP: SPA Records, SPA-55)

=== with Karl Ulrich Schnabel, piano ===
- Helen and Karl Ulrich Schnabel – One Piano, Four Hands; Mozart, Dvorak, Schubert, Weber, Bizet, Mendelssohn, Brahms. (CD: TownHall Records THCD19A-B)
- Helen and Karl Ulrich Schnabel – The Four-Hand Recordings of the 1950s, Vol. 1. Bizet, Debussy, Schubert, Mozart. (CD: TownHall Records THCD76A-B)
- Helen and Karl Ulrich Schnabel – The Four-Hand Recordings of the 1950s, Vol. 2. Mozart, Brahms, Schubert, Mendelssohn, Weber. (CD: TownHall Records THCD77A-B)
- Schubert: Sonata in B-flat major, Op. 30; Four Polonaises, D. 824. (LP: SPA 49)
- Mendelssohn: Allegro brilliant; Andante and Variations. Weber: Five Pieces, Op. 10, No. 5 and Op. 60, Nos. 5, 6, 7 and 8. (LP: SPA 50)
- Mozart: Concerto for Two Pianos in E-flat, K. 365; Concerto for Three Pianos in F, K. 242 (with Ilse von Alpenheim, piano). Vienna Symphony, conducted by Bernhard Paumgartner. (LP: Epic LC 3259)
- Mozart: Sonata in D major, K. 448. Sonata in D major, K. 381. Tema con variazioni in G major, K. 501. (LP: Philips A 00326)
- Schubert: Four Polonaises, D. 824. Debussy: Epigraphes antiques, Nos. 1, 2 and 4. (LP: Philips NBE 11004; Philips 402024 E)
- Schubert: Eight Variations in A-flat, D. 813. Four Variations in B-flat, D. 603. Eight Variations in C, D. 908. (LP: Philips 06046 R)
- Schubert: Fantasy in F minor, D. 940. Brahms: Hungarian Dances Nos. 4, 3, 2, 11, 1, 12, 13 and 17. (LP: Philips N 00255 L, Epic LC 3183)
- Mozart: Sonata in C major, K. 521. Dvorák: Legend Op. 59, No. 4. Schubert: Fantasy in F minor, Op. 103. Weber: Rondo and Adagio. Schubert: Sonata in B-flat major, Op. 30. Mozart: Andante with Variations in G major, K. 501. Bizet: Five Pieces from Jeux d’enfants, Op. 22. Mendelssohn: Andante tranquillo with Variations, Op. 83a. Brahms: Two Hungarian Dances. (LP: Sheffield/Town Hall, Album S-19, ACM158A-B, ACM159A-B)

=== with Artur Schnabel, Therese Behr-Schnabel, and Karl Ulrich Schnabel ===
- The Schnabels – A Musical Legacy, Unpublished and Lost Historic Recordings. Mozart, Schumann, Schubert, C. P. E. Bach, J. S. Bach, Mendelssohn, Paradisi. (CD: TownHall Records THCD74A-B)
