= Therese Behr-Schnabel =

German contralto lieder singer and teacher

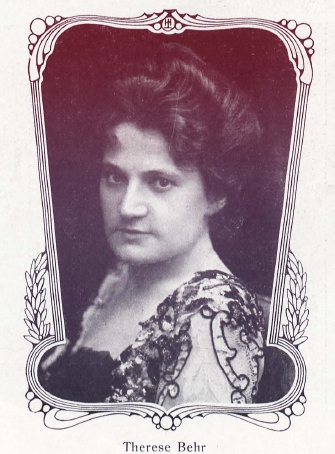
- Therese Behr in 1903
- Born: Therese Behr; 14 September 1876; Stuttgart, Kingdom of Prussia, German Empire
- Died: 30 January 1959 (aged 82); Lugano, Switzerland
- Occupations: contralto singer, singing teacher
- Spouse: Artur Schnabel
- Children: Karl Ulrich Schnabel, Stefan Schnabel

Therese Behr-Schnabel (née Behr; 14 September 1876 – 30 January 1959) was a German contralto. She was best known for her interpretations of lieder.

== Life ==
Therese Behr was born to interior designer Carl Behr and his wife Lina Behr (née Zenegg) in Stuttgart on 14 September 1876. In 1881, the family moved to Mainz. Therese Behr's brother, the conductor and violinist Hermann Behr, arranged for her to have music lessons in nearby Frankfurt with Julius Stockhausen; she studied with Stockhausen from 1893 until 1895, and then continued in Cologne with Franz Wüllner.

She moved to Berlin in 1898 to study with Etelka Gerster. In 1900, the then-unknown pianist Artur Schnabel was hired to accompany Behr, who already had a successful international career, on a concert tour in East Prussia. The two married in 1905. They frequently performed together, and it was Behr's fame as a singer of Lieder—and her insistence that her husband accompany her—that drew the public's attention to Schnabel's ability as a pianist. The Schnabels' twelve-room apartment on Wielandstrasse in Berlin-Charlottenburg soon became a meeting point for Berlin music circles. Behr also taught voice lessons in their home.

After the Nazis came to power in 1933, Behr and Schnabel left Berlin, as Schnabel very clearly foresaw the political troubles that were to come. For the next few years, they spent summers in Tremezzo, Lake Como, and winters in London. Summers in Tremezzo, for these years, were also an opportunity for Behr, Schnabel, and their son Karl Ulrich Schnabel (1909-2001) to teach summer courses. The family relocated to New York in 1939, where Behr continued teaching.

Behr returned to Europe for the first time in 1946, after the war. Thereafter, she spent summers in Switzerland and Italy. After Schnabel's death in 1951, she moved back to Tremezzo permanently, and remained there until her death in Lugano on 30 January 1959. Therese Behr's papers are held at the Music Archive of the Academy of Arts, Berlin.

=== Family ===
She married pianist Artur Schnabel in 1905. Behr and Artur Schnabel had two sons, the pianist Karl Ulrich Schnabel (1909–2001) and the actor Stefan Schnabel (1912–1999). Karl Ulrich Schnabel's daughter Ann Schnabel Mottier currently manages the Schnabel Music Foundation together with her husband François Mottier.

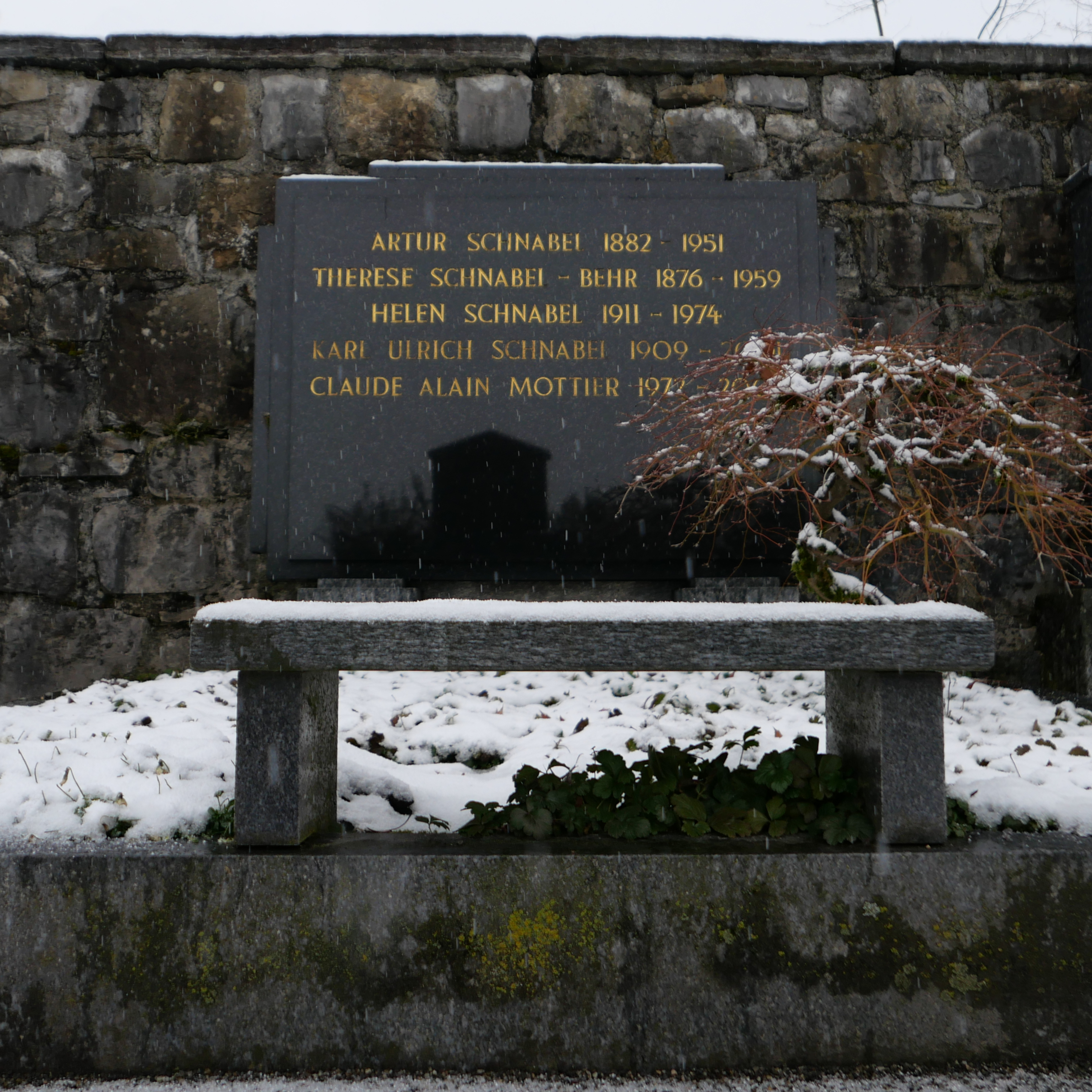
The family grave in January 2024.

Therese Schnabel was buried next to her husband in his grave at the cemetery of Schwyz, the capital of the homonymous canton. Their son Karl Ulrich, his wife Helen, née Fogel (1911–1974), a pianist from the USA, and Therese's great-grandson Claude Alain Mottier (1972–2002), who was also a pianist, found their last resting place in the tomb, too. In 2006, the municipality of Schwyz declared the grave site a protected monument wherefore it is exempted from regulations that stipulate the removal of the remains after a certain period.

== Career ==
Behr began her singing career as a student of Julius Stockhausen in Frankfurt am Main, and continued her musical education with Franz Wüllner in Cologne. In 1898, at the age of 22, she moved to Berlin to study with Etelka Gerster. Her "tentative" first appearance in 1897 was followed by a second debut on 21 January 1899 at the Berlin Singakademie, accompanied by the Liszt student Alfred Reisenauer. This performance, which featured the music of Schubert and Brahms, was received very positively: the Allgemeine musikalische Zeitung declared that "a genuine high priestess of the art has arisen once again." The following years saw performances of Lieder in London, Paris, St. Petersburg, Moscow, Budapest, and Brussels, among others.

In 1903, Behr co-founded the Berliner Vokalquartett (Berlin Vocal Quartet) with soprano Jeanette Grumbacher-de Jong, tenor Ludwig Hess, and bass Arthur van Eweyk. The quartet was renowned for its performances with orchestra of works such as Handel's Messiah and Beethoven's Ninth Symphony.

Reviewer Wilhelm Kienzl wrote of the ensemble, "The characters of the four beautiful voices fit unusually well together, as if they had been selected with love and understanding from hundreds of singers by someone with a fine ear. Of course, the singers' own artistic intelligence and sense for style also play a significant part. Here, one has the result of sustained work, with which such a fine gradation of sound has been reached that one scarcely has the impression that four people are performing. And yet, despite all the humble subsuming of the individual to the group, the individuality of each artist can be recognized. The ensemble technique (rhythmic precision, dynamics, simultaneity of initial and final consonants) leaves nothing to be desired." Kienzl had just one complaint: "It is regrettable that this elite quartet does not perform four-voice a cappella songs, such as old madrigals and motets. These would—even because of the sound alone—bring some variety into the program."

Behr's and Schnabel's first encounter in 1900 was also the beginning of a lifelong musical collaboration. The two were known for their interpretations of the Lieder of Schubert, Schumann, and Brahms. Their concerts were described as exhibiting the "most subtle, finest taste"; in them, wrote reviewer Wilhelm Kleefeld, "serious will joined hands with the most perfect ability. These Schubert, Schumann, and Brahms evenings offered all participants hours of pure, unadulterated joy of sound." In the winter of 1909/10, Behr and Schnabel performed Schubert's song cycle Die Winterreise. Schnabel's biographer César Saerchinger remarked that "it was a hazardous undertaking for a woman to sing this intensely romantic song cycle, set to a series of poems which so obviously are the outpourings of a love-sick youth, and which in the realistic public's mind called for a man's voice." Nonetheless, the concert was met with such acclaim that the duo performed all Schubert's song cycles over the next few years. They repeated this feat in the Schubert centennial year 1928 in concerts that critic Alfred Einstein described as "the highest possible integration of interpretative powers applied to deep and sincere feeling".

The duo performed not only works by established German masters, but also Schnabel's own songs for voice and piano, many of which were dedicated to his wife.

After the birth of her sons, Behr appeared in public less frequently, accompanied almost always by her husband and, later, her son Karl Ulrich Schnabel.

Behr taught throughout her life. Her students include Doda Conrad, Tilla Durieux, Eva Leßmann, Hilde Ellger, Gertrud Hindemith, Sabine Kalter, Lotte Leonard, Peter Pears, Maria Stader, Erika Stiedry-Wagner, Mary Simmons, and Randolph Symonette.

== Reputation ==
Behr was widely recognized for her rich voice and her "instinctive sense of phrasing and emphasis". Wilhelm Kienzl wrote that she "treated her soft, beautifully balanced mezzo-soprano [sic] with artistic refinement". Her voice inspired Richard Strauss to compose his song "Traum durch die Dämmerung" (1895) for her.

Behr was best known as a singer of Lieder, but she was also acclaimed as a soloist with orchestra; her early career saw performances with conductors Arthur Nikisch, Felix Weingartner, and Richard Strauss. British writer and friend of the family Edward Crankshaw wrote, "There are not many people who have the least idea either of the wonderful musicianship of Therese Behr Schnabel, ... or of the debt her husband owed to her. She was older than he by several years, and it was she who, after his infant prodigy days, forced him on the German public by insisting he appear as her accompanist. She had the most unerring musical tact of anyone I have ever known, and this came out in her singing even when she had no voice left at all."

== Discography ==
The only recording of Behr from the height of her career is a private acoustic recording from 1904:

- Symposium label CD 1356

A few other recordings from the 1930s exist; these recordings were made well past the height of Behr's career:

- The Schnabels – A Musical Legacy, Unpublished and Lost Historic Recordings. Mozart, Schumann, Schubert, C.P.E. Bach, J.S. Bach, Mendelssohn, Paradisi. (CD: TownHall Records THCD74A-B)
- Schubert and Schnabel – An Historical Recording, Volume IV. (New York: Arabesque Records, 1987)
