= Alfred Einstein =

German-American musicologist and music editor

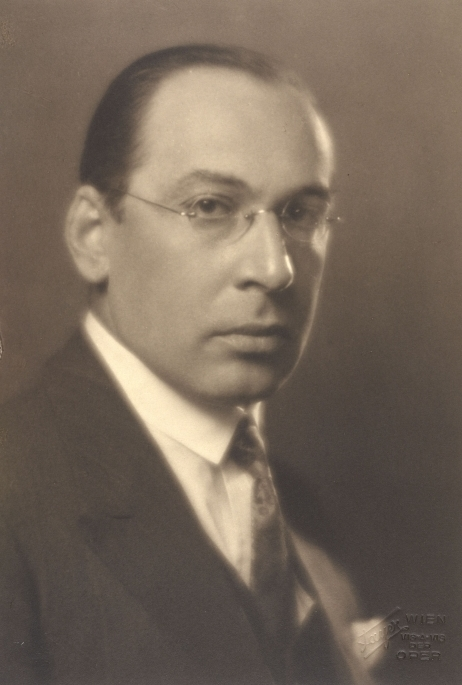
- Einstein in 1927
- Born: December 30, 1880; Munich, German Empire
- Died: February 13, 1952 (aged 71); El Cerrito, California, United States
- Education: Ludwig-Maximilians-Universität München
- Occupation: Musicologist

Alfred Einstein (December 30, 1880 – February 13, 1952) was a German and American musicologist and music editor. He was born in Munich, and fled Nazi Germany after Hitler's Machtergreifung, arriving in the United States by 1939. He is best known for being the editor of the first major revision of the Köchel catalogue, which was published in 1936. The Köchel catalogue is the extensive catalogue of the works of Wolfgang Amadeus Mozart.

== Biography ==
Einstein was born in Munich. Though he originally studied law, he quickly realized his principal love was music, and he acquired a doctorate at the Ludwig-Maximilians-Universität München, focusing on instrumental music of the late Renaissance and early Baroque eras, in particular music for the viola da gamba. In 1918, he became the first editor of the Zeitschrift für Musikwissenschaft; slightly later he became music critic for the Münchner Post; and in 1927 became music critic for the Berliner Tageblatt. In this period he was also a friend of the composer Heinrich Kaspar Schmid in Munich and Augsburg.

Einstein was Jewish; hence in 1933, after Hitler's rise to power in Germany, he was under dire threat and fled the country, moving first to London, then to Italy, and finally to the United States in 1939, where he held a succession of teaching posts at universities including Smith College, Columbia University, Princeton University, the University of Michigan, and the Hartt School of Music in Hartford, Connecticut.

Einstein not only researched and wrote detailed works on specific topics, but wrote popular histories of music, including the Short History of Music (1917), and Greatness in Music (1941). In particular, due to his depth of familiarity with Mozart, he published an important and extensive revision of the Köchel catalogue of Mozart's music (1936). It is this work for which Einstein is most well known. Einstein also published a comprehensive, three-volume set The Italian Madrigal (1949) on the secular Italian form, the first detailed study of the subject. His 1945 volume Mozart: His Character, His Work was an influential study of Mozart and is perhaps his best known book.

== Posthumous reputation ==
Einstein's Mozart studies were subject to two forms of criticism after his death.

First, Einstein promulgated what came to be judged as an unrealistic and romanticized view of Mozart, notably in suggesting that Mozart wrote his works for himself, as a form of self-expression or in hopes of making a posthumous reputation. The most vivid example was his suggestion that Mozart's last three symphonies were never performed, but were written, perhaps, as an "appeal to eternity". This view was criticized vividly by Zaslaw (1994), who gave extensive evidence that the symphonies were performed, and that Mozart himself was a pragmatic, hard-working person who was doing his best to make a living in difficult circumstances.

Second, in dating Mozart's works Einstein was willing to label conjecture as more certain than was justified. In particular, Einstein felt that careful scrutiny of musical works for their style would lead to accurate dating. This idea proved hard to sustain after Wolfgang Plath and Alan Tyson later introduced more hard evidence onto the scene in the form of (respectively) handwriting analysis and watermark studies; these revealed serious errors arising from Einstein's attempts to date works by their style.

== Relationship to Albert Einstein ==
While one source (1980) lists Alfred as a cousin of the scientist Albert Einstein, another claims (1993) that no relationship has been verified. Some websites claim they were both descended from a Moyses Einstein seven generations back, hence they were sixth cousins. In 1991, Alfred's daughter Eva stated that they were not related. On the other hand, she wrote in 2003 that they were fifth cousins on one side, and fifth cousins once removed on the other, according to research by George Arnstein. They were photographed together in 1947 when Albert Einstein received an honorary doctorate from Princeton, but they did not know that they were distantly related.

== Works ==
- Gluck (Master Musicians Series-Series Editor Eric Blom), translated by Eric Blom, J. M. Dent & Sons LTD, 1936
- A Short History of Music, translation of Geschichte der Musik, 1937, rev. 1938, 1947
- Canzoni Sonetti Strambotti et Frottole. Libro Tertio ( Andrea Antico, 1517). Smith College: Northampton, MA, 1941
- Golden Age of the Madrigal: Twelve Five-Part Mixed Choruses. G. Schirmer: New York, 1942
- Greatness in Music, translation of Grösse in der Musik by César Saerchinger, Oxford University Press, 1941
- Mozart: His Character, His Work, translated by Arthur Mendel and Nathan Broder, Oxford University Press, 1945
- Music in the Romantic Era: A History of Musical Thought in the 19th Century, 1947, rev. 1949
- The Italian Madrigal, translated by Alexander H. Krappe, Roger H. Sessions, and Oliver Strunk, Princeton University Press, 1949 (3 volumes)
- Schubert, translated by David Ascoli, Cassell & Co., 1951

== Other sources ==
- Zaslaw, Neal (1994). "Mozart As a Working Stiff". In Morris, James M. (ed.). On Mozart. New York: Cambridge University Press.
