= Jin Ju =

Jin Ju 居觐
- Born: Ju Jin; Shanghai, China
- Origin: Beijing, Siena
- Genres: Classical music
- Occupation: Musician
- Instrument: Piano

Jin Ju (simplified Chinese: 居觐; traditional Chinese: 居覲; pinyin: Jū Jìn; Shanghai, 1976) is a Chinese-born Italian pianist. Jin Ju studied piano at the Central Conservatory of Music in Beijing and the Accademia Chigiana in Siena. She won the Echo Klassik piano recital award in 2012 for her recording of works by Czerny and Schubert.

== Discography ==
- Beethoven: Appassionata; Czerny: La Ricordanza. Variations on a favorite theme by Rode op. 33; Franz Schubert: Sonata D 958 c minor. SACD (MDG)
- Chopin: late piano works
- Robert Schumann: Piano music (Fantasia op. 17 C major, Sonata No. 1 op. 11 F sharp minor)
- Chopin: late piano works Vol 2
