= Karl Ulrich Schnabel =

Austrian pianist (1909–2001)

- Born: 6 August 1909; Berlin, Germany
- Died: 27 August 2001 (aged 92); Danbury, Connecticut, U.S.
- Citizenship: Austrian
- Education: Berlin Hochschule für Musik
- Occupations: Pianist, Professor
- Employer: Manhattan School of Music (1985-2000)
- Spouse: Helen Fogel
- Children: Ann
- Parent(s): Artur Schnabel and Therese Behr
- Relatives: Stefan Schnabel (brother)

Karl Ulrich Schnabel (August 6, 1909 – August 27, 2001) was an Austrian pianist. Schnabel was the son of pianist Artur Schnabel and operatic contralto and lieder singer Therese Behr and elder brother of the American actor Stefan Schnabel. An internationally celebrated teacher of the piano, his students include, among others, Leon Fleisher, Claude Frank, Richard Goode, Kwong-Kwong Ma, Stanislav Ioudenitch, Jon Nakamatsu, Murray Perahia, and Peter Serkin.

External audio
- You may listen to Karl Ulrich Schnabel and his father Artur Schnabel performing Wolfgang Amadeus Mozart's Concerto for Two Pianos in E-flat major, K. 365 with Adrian Boult conducting the London Symphony Orchestra in 1936 here on archive.org

== Biography ==
Karl Schnabel was born in Berlin on August 6, 1909. He began studying piano at the age of five. From 1922–1926 he studied at the Berlin Hochschule für Musik with Leonid Kreutzer and Paul Juon. He had a distinguished career as a master piano teacher and as an international performer.

Schnabel left Berlin in 1933 when Adolf Hitler came to power, settling briefly at Lake Como; he emigrated to the United States in 1939, shortly before World War II. In the same year he married the American pianist Helen Fogel (1911–74), with whom he played a large repertory of piano duets. They had a daughter, Ann. During World War II he interrupted his musical career to do war work as head of an electronic laboratory in Massachusetts.

Schnabel's extra-musical interests included rock-climbing and photography. For several years, he was active producing motion pictures; in 1932, he was producer, director and cinematographer of a feature-length film based on a German fairy tale. As a young man, he participated in table tennis tournaments. During this time, Karl Ulrich Schnabel also maintained an elaborate miniature electric train set, complete with timetables. Family friend Paul Hindemith assisted in running the trains.

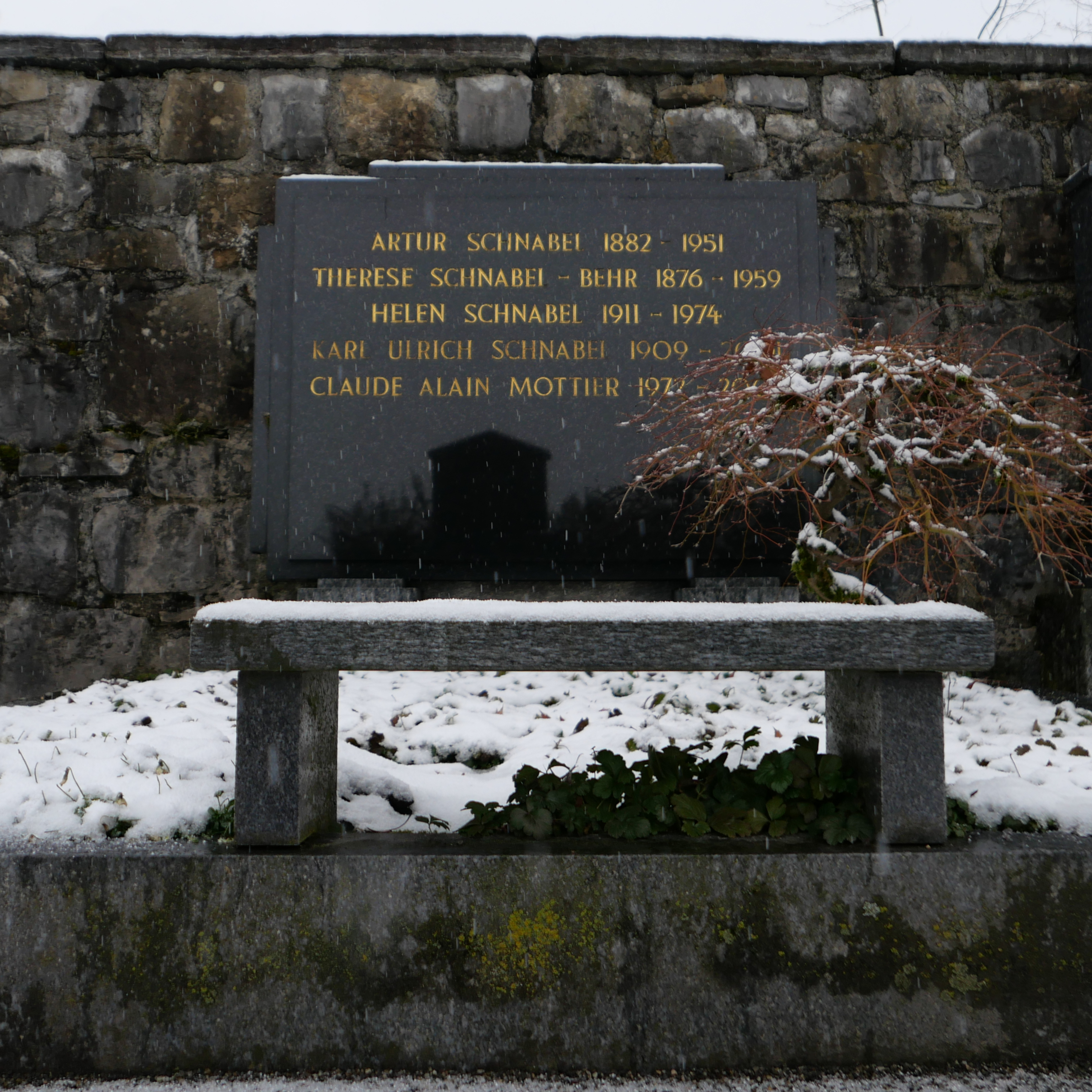
The family grave in January 2024.

Karl Ulrich Schnabel died in Danbury, Connecticut, on August 27, 2001. He was buried in the family plot in Schwyz, Switzerland, adjoining his parents and wife. Karl Ulrich Schnabel's papers are held at the Music Archive of the Akademie der Künste in Berlin. His daughter Ann Schnabel Mottier currently manages the Schnabel Music Foundation, together with her husband Francois Mottier. Their son Claude Alain Mottier (1972-2002), who was a pianist as well, died as an innocent victim in a traffic accident and was buried in the family grave. In 2006, the municipality of Schwyz declared the grave site a protected monument wherefore it is exempted from regulations that stipulate the removal of the remains after a certain period.

== Performance career ==
=== Solo ===
Karl Ulrich Schnabel inherited from his parents an approach that united dramatic intensity of expression with absolute fidelity to the printed text. He is remembered for his imaginative interpretation of the Schubert song cycles. In 1926 he made his recital début in Berlin, and subsequently gave recitals throughout Europe, North and South America, Russia, Japan, Australia, and New Zealand.

He accompanied his mother at home and for concerts and recordings. Beginning at an early age he played for her voice lessons and coached her students.

Schnabel made many recordings, solo and four-hand, for His Master's Voice, EMI, Philips, Musical Heritage Society, Sheffield, and TownHall, among others. He was the author of the well-known book Modern Technique of the Pedal (1950). He also published editions of compositions by Schubert and Weber.

=== Piano duos ===
Schnabel dedicated himself passionately to the revival of the largely neglected music for piano four hands, recording music by Schubert, Mozart, and Schumann, among others. Four-hand performance, Schnabel remarked, was an entirely different enterprise than solo performance: "Four-hand playing is a complex art that requires enormous time and patience. You are half of a whole rather than a whole in yourself. The four-hand repertory possesses qualities of chamber music, symphonic music, and virtuoso music -- sometimes all in the same piece."

Karl Ulrich Schnabel started duo performances and recordings with his father as partner. Some of these early performances are memorialized on record. The two switched Primo and Secondo parts, and made a pact never to reveal who played which part on the recordings.

In 1939, he and his wife, American pianist Helen Fogel, founded the Piano Duo Schnabel, which performed concertos for two pianos and orchestra as well as recitals for one piano, four hands. In 1956, the duo participated at the Holland Festival in five performances with orchestra, and in 1972 they performed at the Edinburgh Festival. Reviews of the ensemble demonstrate that the Schnabels mastered the challenges of four-hand playing with skill and passion: "The four hand piano concert [...] came closer to perfection than any recital we have heard this year [...] They achieved a sheer transparency of sound, at once the most important and the most difficult requisite of four-hand piano music. It is incredibly difficult for two people to play a piece on one piano and be exactly together in timing, phrasing, and expression, yet the Schnabels were beautifully together and made of every note a work of art."

Five years after his wife’s death, in 1979, Karl Ulrich Schnabel formed a new duo with the Canadian pianist Joan Rowland. This duo, as well, was regularly praised for what the Washington Post deemed its "combination of spirit and jaunty elegance."

== Karl Ulrich Schnabel as a teacher ==
Karl Ulrich Schnabel is best known today as an internationally celebrated teacher of the piano. He began teaching at the age of 13 as his father's assistant. In 1940, he became head of all the instrumental departments at New York City’s Dalcroze School. Beginning in 1947, he resumed a family tradition: annual international summer master courses at Lake Como, Italy. In addition, he taught master courses in England, Scotland, France, Italy, Germany, Austria, Spain, Israel, Brazil, Japan, Australia, New Zealand, Canada, and all over the United States, including at the Ravinia Festival. He became a faculty member at the Manhattan School of Music in 1985, and remained there until his retirement in 2000.

Beginning in the early 1960s he taught numerous master classes throughout the world. Pianists who have played in Schnabel's master classes include Murray Perahia, Richard Goode, Wyung Whon Chung, Ursula Oppens and George Watson. His former students include Leon Fleisher, Claude Frank, and Peter Serkin. Edward Turgeon and Anne Louise-Turgeon, winners of the Murray Dranoff International Two Piano Competition, studied with Karl Ulrich Schnabel, as did Van Cliburn competition winners Stanislav Ioudenitch (2001) and Jon Nakamatsu (1997).

Schnabel's passion for teaching led him to theorize extensively about how to achieve the correct relationship between piano technique and musical expression--the former "was always to remain in the service of the spirit of the music." He emphasized a technique that required "arm participation": the pianist should use wrists and arms as well as fingers. He paid scrupulous attention to the subtle yet meaningful effects achieved through pedaling, setting these down in the book Modern Technique of the Pedal (1950). This volume has been translated from the original English into Italian, Korean, Chinese, and other languages. He even developed techniques to crescendo on a note and to achieve vibrato, which he explains on camera in the film Con Brio. Karl Ulrich Schnabel: Master Teacher of Piano (2001).

Schnabel's teaching was characterized by a fine attention to emotion. Most pianists, he believed, played using just three or four emotions. But music demanded more than that: "To be really interesting, you must play with all the emotions." He asked his students to make lists of all the emotions they could think of. One of his students came up with a list of over five hundred emotions, and "her playing was never dull again." He also had a flair for imagery, describing the grotesque of Schumann's Fantasie as "a whole army of three-legged trolls advancing" and the turbulence of Chopin's Fantaisie as "Poseidon stirring up the waves with his big fork." Such vivid language features prominently in English author Richard Rhodes's new book The Teaching of Karl Ulrich Schnabel, in which Rhodes, a long-time amateur student of Schnabel's, discusses Schnabel's comments on works by Bach, Beethoven, Chopin, Mozart, Schubert, and Schumann.

== Discography ==
=== Piano solo ===
- Karl Ulrich Schnabel, Piano. Mozart and Beethoven. (CD: TownHall Records THCD-68)
- Karl Ulrich Schnabel, Piano. 100th Birthday Celebration. Schubert. (CD: TownHall Records THCD-69)
- Bach: Capriccio on the Departure of a Beloved Brother, BWV 992. Paradies: Sonata No. 10 in D. (78 Victor 4293/4)
- Mendelssohn: Songs Without Words, Nos. 12, 22, 23, 24, 28, 30, 32, 34, 35, 45, 47, 48. (78 Victor Set M-226)
- Schubert: Wanderer Fantasy. Twenty Dances. (LP: WCFM-Washington 17, McIntosh MM 1104)
- Schumann: Papillons, Op. 2. Chopin: Scherzo No. 3 in C Sharp Minor, Op. 39. Liszt: Années de Pélérinage; Canzonetta del Salvator Rosa; Au bord d’une source; Sonetto del Petrarca No. 123; La Chapelle de Guillaume Tell. (LP: Urania 8001) (in part contained on CD: Town Hall, 2 Disc Set, THCD58 A-B)
- Chopin: Polonaise in E Flat Minor, Op. 26, No. 2; Nocturne in B, Op. 32, No. 1. Liszt: Il Pensieroso. Debussy: Preludes Book 1, La sérénade interrompue, La danse de Puck. (LP: VIS Radio)
- Mendelssohn: Sonata in E Major, Op. 6. Schubert: Waltzes, Ländler, and German Dances. (LP: Sheffield/Town Hall M-8/S-8) (CD: Town Hall, 2 Disc Set, THCD58 A-B)
- Schubert: Sonata in A Minor, Op. 42; Six moments musicaux. (LP: Musical Heritage Society MHS 1245)
- Mozart: Fantasy in C Minor, K. 475; Piano Sonata in C Minor, K. 457; Andante in F Major, K. 616. (LP: Musical Heritage Society MHS 1700)
- Beethoven: Sonata No. 15 in D Major, Op. 28; Sonata No. 30 in E Major, Op. 109. (LP: Musical Heritage Society MHS 3296 L)

=== Collaborations ===
==== with Artur Schnabel, piano ====
- Schubert: Marches Militaires (3), D. 733. Marches, D. 819, Nos. 2 and 3. Rondo in A, D. 951. Divertissement à l’hongroise, D. 818. Andantino Varié, D. 823, No. 2. Allegro in A Minor (“Lebensstürme”), D. 947. (CD: Arabesque Z-6571/5 – “Schnabel Plays Schubert” Volumes 1-5)
- Bach: Concerto for Two Pianos in C, BWV 1061. London Symphony Orchestra, conducted by Sir Adrian Boult. (CD: Pearl 9399)
- Mozart: Concerto for Two Pianos in E Flat, K. 365. London Symphony Orchestra, conducted by Sir Adrian Boult. (CD: Arabesque Z 6590)

==== with Helen Schnabel, piano ====
- Helen and Karl Ulrich Schnabel – One Piano, Four Hands; Mozart, Dvorak, Schubert, Weber, Bizet, Mendelssohn, Brahms. (CD: TownHall Records THCD19A-B)
- Helen and Karl Ulrich Schnabel – The Four-Hand Recordings of the 1950s, Vol. 1. Bizet, Debussy, Schubert, Mozart. (CD: TownHall Records THCD76A-B)
- Helen and Karl Ulrich Schnabel – The Four-Hand Recordings of the 1950s, Vol. 2. Mozart, Brahms, Schubert, Mendelssohn, Weber. (CD: TownHall Records THCD77A-B)
- Schubert: Sonata in B Flat Major, Op. 30; Four Polonaises, D. 824. (LP: SPA 49)
- Mendelssohn: Allegro brilliant; Andante and Variations. Weber: Five Pieces, Op. 10, No. 5 and Op. 60, Nos. 5, 6, 7 and 8. (LP: SPA 50)
- Mozart: Concerto for Two Pianos in E Flat, K. 365; Concerto for Three Pianos in F, K. 242 (with Ilse von Alpenheim, piano). Vienna Symphony Orchestra, conducted by Bernhard Paumgartner.(LP: Epic LC 3259)
- Mozart: Sonata in D Major, K. 448. Sonata in D Major, K. 381. Tema con variazioni in G Major, K. 501. (LP: Philips A 00326)
- Schubert: Four Polonaises, D. 824. Debussy: Epigraphes antiques, Nos. 1, 2 and 4. (LP: Philips NBE 11004; Philips 402024 E)
- Schubert: Eight Variations in A Flat, D. 813. Four Variations in B Flat, D. 603. Eight Variations in C, D. 908. (LP: Philips 06046 R)
- Schubert: Fantasy in F. Minor, D. 940. Brahms: Hungarian Dances Nos. 4, 3, 2, 11, 1, 12, 13 and 17. (LP: Philips N 00255 L, Epic LC 3183)
- Mozart: Sonata in C Major, K. 521. Dvorák: Legend Op. 59, No. 4. Schubert: Fantasy in F Minor, Op. 103. Weber: Rondo and Adagio. Schubert: Sonata in B Flat Major, Op. 30. Mozart: Andante with Variations in G Major, K. 501. Bizet: Five Pieces from “Jeux d’enfants,” Op. 22. Mendelssohn: Andante tranquillo with Variations, Op. 83a. Brahms: Two Hungarian Dances. (LP: Sheffield/Town Hall, Album S-19, ACM158A-B, ACM159A-B)

==== with Joan Rowland, piano ====
- Dvorák: From the Bohemian Forest, Op. 68. Ten Legends, Op. 59. (CD: Town Hall THCD-49)
- Schubert: Fantasy in F Minor, D. 940. Four Polonaises, D. 824. Variations in A Flat on an Original Theme, D. 813. Four Ländler, D. 814. Rondo in D Major, D. 608. (CD: Sheffield Lab 10054-2F)
- Mozart: Sonata in F Major, K. 497. Schubert: Divertissement (Sonata in E minor) on Original French Themes Op. 63 and Op. 84 D. 823. Schubert: Eight Variations on a Theme from Hérold’s Opera “Marie” Op. 82, No. 1, D. 908. (CD: Town Hall THCD-41)
- Schubert: Introduction and Variations in B Flat, D. 603. Grand Duo, Op. 140. (CD: Town Hall THCD-37)
- Beethoven: Variations on a theme by Count Waldstein; March in C Major, Op. 45, No. 4; Mozart: Sonata, F Major, K. 497 (LP: Sonic Arts)

==== with Leonard Shure, piano ====
- Chopin: Rondo in C. (78 Victor 11618) (CD: Town Hall, THCD58 A)

==== with Alphonse Onnou, violin, and Robert Maas, cello ====
- Schubert: Trio in B Flat, Op. 99. (78 Victor Set M-429)

==== with Artur Schnabel, Therese Behr Schnabel, and Helen Schnabel ====
- The Schnabels – A Musical Legacy, Unpublished and Lost Historic Recordings. Mozart, Schumann, Schubert, C.P.E. Bach, J.S. Bach, Mendelssohn, Paradisi. (CD: TownHall Records THCD74A-B)

== Sources ==
- William Glock. The New Grove Dictionary of Opera, edited by Stanley Sadie (1992), ISBN 0-333-73432-7 and ISBN 1-56159-228-5
- web site of the Schnabel Music Foundation
