= Natalie Ni Shi =

Canadian opera singer

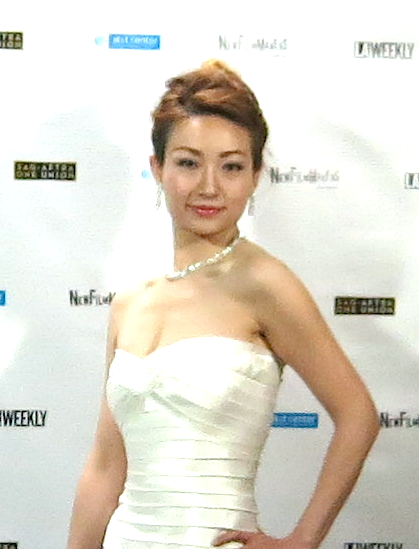
- Shi in 2014
- Born: 9 May 1983 (age 42); Vancouver, Canada
- Occupations: Opera singer, actress

Natalie Ni Shi (Chinese: 石妮; born 9 May 1983) is a Canadian lyric operatic soprano and film actress. She has received critical acclaim since her debut as Queen of the Night in The Magic Flute.

Shi has performed in cities like Vancouver, Beijing, Hong Kong, New York, Rome and Vienna.

== Early life and career ==
Shi was born to a Chinese family in Canada before moving back to China with her parents. Her mother was the cousin of famous Chinese philosopher Ai Siqi, and her father's ancestor was a Qing Dynasty imperial doctor.

When she was 9, Shi participated in an NHK television documentary about the 100th anniversary of the China-Vietnam railway, which sparked a love of performing.

At the age of 13, she left her parents to move to the UK, where she studied at the Sherborne College and Hurtwood House. Her love of opera and musicals began during a school trip to watch Cats. After participating in several school musicals, Shi returned to Vancouver and graduated from University of British Columbia, where she majored in Opera Performance and minored in Commerce. In her final year, the opera artist program Opera Nuova cast her in Queen of the Night.

Shortly after graduating, she moved to Rome to study with Rolando Nicolosi (Luciano Pavarotti's pianist and coach). In 2010, Shi was invited to perform in Vienna's Golden Hall, and later studied with language coach Nico Castel at the Juilliard School of Music, where James Lvyone offered her the main role in his newly composed Chinese opera. Shi realised the importance of mastering the language and started to notice more aesthetic differences between Chinese and Western music styles, which inspired her to complete her master's degree at the Central Conservatory of Music in Beijing.

In 2015, Shi joined IEMR Resources Inc. (CVE:IRI) as one of main five Directors.

== Honors and awards ==
Shi performed the Canadian national anthem for Canadian citizenship ceremonies, receiving compliments from Senate Mobina Jaffer and judges. In both 2013 and 2014, ambassador Mr/ Guy Saint-Jacques invited her to sing the Canadian national anthem at the National Day of Canada celebrations in Beijing.

Shi has won many awards and competitions, including the 40th XL Vincenzo Bellini International Voice Competition in 2008.

In 2014, she was invited to be the judge of Miss Chinese Cosmos Pageant Americas Region.

== Academia ==
Shi created a seven-series analysis of Le nozze di Figaro, which was broadcast on China National Radio. Her work on A Midsummer Night's Dream was published in CNKI. China Central Television broadcast her performances at the Yunnan 8 Universities Academia Concert.

== Philanthropy ==
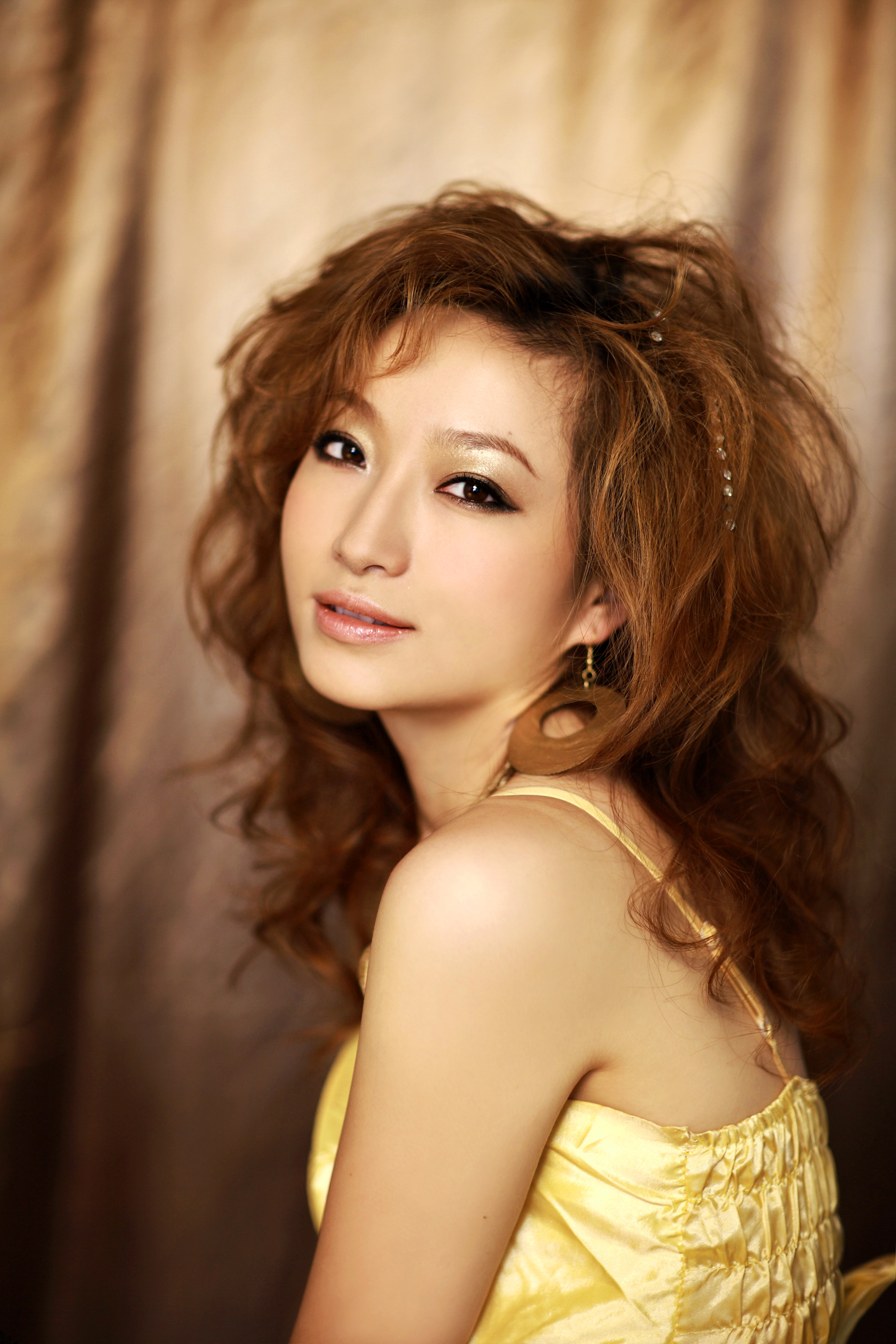
Shi preparing for Charity Concert Gala night in Vancouver

Shi founded the North America Foundation for Arts and Minorities in 2008, with the aim of helping people suffering from poverty, natural disasters and sickness. She has since held several benefit concerts in China and Canada for disaster relief, such as for the 2008 Sichuan earthquake or for projects in Burma in 2018. She also held the "Classical Enlightenment" performance in 2016, which raised money for an Alzheimer's Disease charity.

== Discography ==
- 2004: Beauty Lies Within
- 2009: Keep it up

== Repertoire ==
Role	Composer	Opera
Königin der Nacht	Mozart	Die Zauberflöte
Adele	Johann Strauss	Die Fledermaus
Betly	Donizetti	Betly
Oscar	Verdi	Un ballo in maschera
Olympia	Offenbach	Les contes d'Hoffmann
Norina	Donizetti	Don Pasquale
Titania	Benjamin Britten	A Midsummer Night's Dream
Gilda	Verdi	Rigoletto
Musetta	Puccini	La bohème
Liù	Puccini	Turandot
Countess	Mozart	Le nozze di Figaro
Zerlina	Mozart	Don Giovanni
Rosina	Rossini	Il barbiere di Siviglia
Chiang Ch'ing	John Adams	Nixon in China
Lucia	Donizetti	Lucia di Lammermoor
Xia	James Lvyone	Xia Xin Don
Old woman	Lloyd Burritt	Dream Healer

== Filmography ==
Year	Title	Director	Role
1999	関口知宏の中国鉄道大紀行 (Tomohiro's Railway Tour of China)	NHK Japan	Ni Bao
2007	Fantastic Four: Rise of the Silver Surfer	Tim Story	Fan
2014	Thousands age Thousand miles ride (骑迹)	Wang XiaoHai (王小海)	Zhou Mi Shu
2015	Psychic Snakebite	Eric Taylor	Marie (voice)

== Competitions and awards ==
- International Artists music competition 2009 (Winner)
- 40th XL Vincenzo Bellini International Voice Competition, Italy 2008 (Winner)
- Voice Division, Richmond Music Festival, Vancouver, 2006 (Winner)
- Kiwanis Vancouver Music Festival, Vancouver, 2006 (First place)
- International Chinese Vocal Competition, New York City, 2007 (Semi-finalist)
- Reigate & Regill music Festival, London, England, 1999 (Honorary award)

== Scholarships ==
- Canadian Millennium Scholarship 2006
- British Columbia Scholarship for academic incline in undergraduate study 2008
- Opera Nuova 2008
- 2007 Beijing Outstanding International Student Scholarship 2012
