= Xiaoyong Chen =

Chinese composer living in Germany

Xiaoyong Chen (Chinese: 陈晓勇, born 13 May 1955) is a Chinese composer living in Germany.

== Biography ==
Xiaoyong Chen first studied composition at the Beijing Central Conservatory of Music from 1980 until 1985. In 1985 he moved to Germany where he attended the Music Academy of Hamburg to complete his studies with György Ligeti. Chen works frequently as a guest professor in Taiwan, Hong Kong, China, and other places. Since 1987 he has been a professor at the Hochschule für Musik und Theater Hamburg at the Asia-Africa Institute and he is self-employed.

== Style ==
Chen's style of composition is close to the Asian mentality, where the creation and development of the sound is in the centre of attention. His works consist of a seemingly simple sound event which will develop in unexpected ways. Chen regards the process of composing as communication with the sound; he tries to find and show the possibilities the sound provides. It is for this reason that Chen's works create an open atmosphere which leads, while listening, to the impression that neither composer nor listener can know where the music is leading.

== Key works ==
- Warp

1994, for chamber orchestra

- Evapora

1996, for ensemble

- Invisible Landscapes

1998, for zheng, percussion, piano and ensemble

- Interlaced Landscapes

1999, for orchestra

- Speechlessness, Clearness and Ease

2004, for mixed ensemble

- Floating Colours

2006, for orchestra

- Colours of Dreams

2008, for orchestra
