= Ernst Julius Hähnel =

German sculptor (1811–1891)

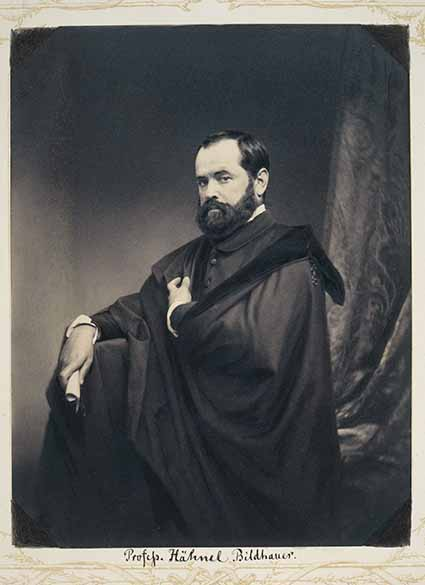
- Ernst Hähnel, photograph by Franz Hanfstaengl
- Born: 9 March 1811; Dresden, Kingdom of Saxony
- Died: 22 May 1891 (aged 80); Dresden, Kingdom of Saxony
- Resting place: Old Catholic Cemetery, Dresden
- Education: Dresden Academy of Fine Arts, Academy of Fine Arts, Munich
- Notable work: Beethoven Monument, Bonn
- Awards: Pour le Mérite, Bavarian Maximilian Order for Science and Art (1861)

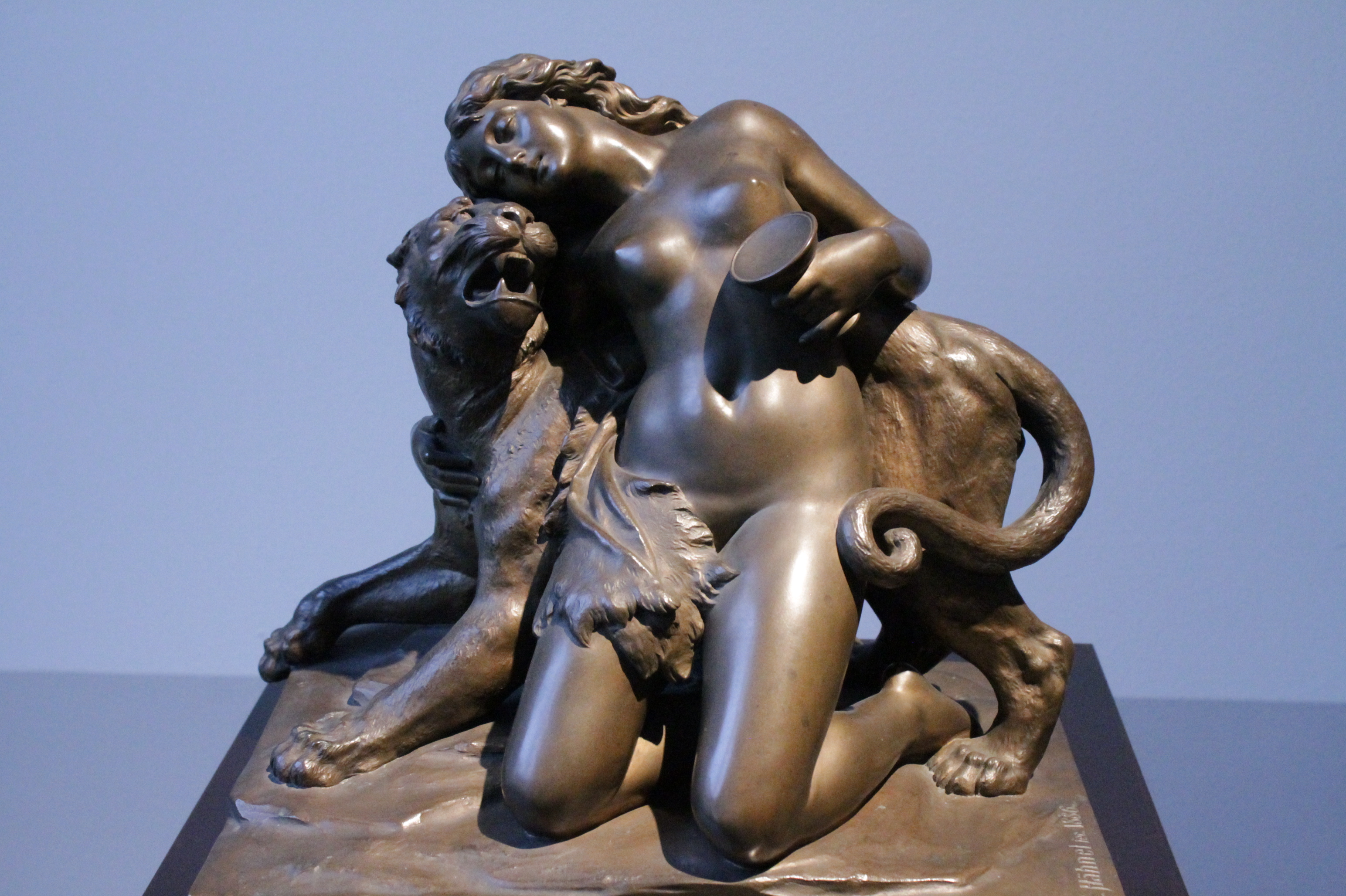
Maenad and the Panther by Ernst Julius Hähnel 1886, Albertinum, Dres

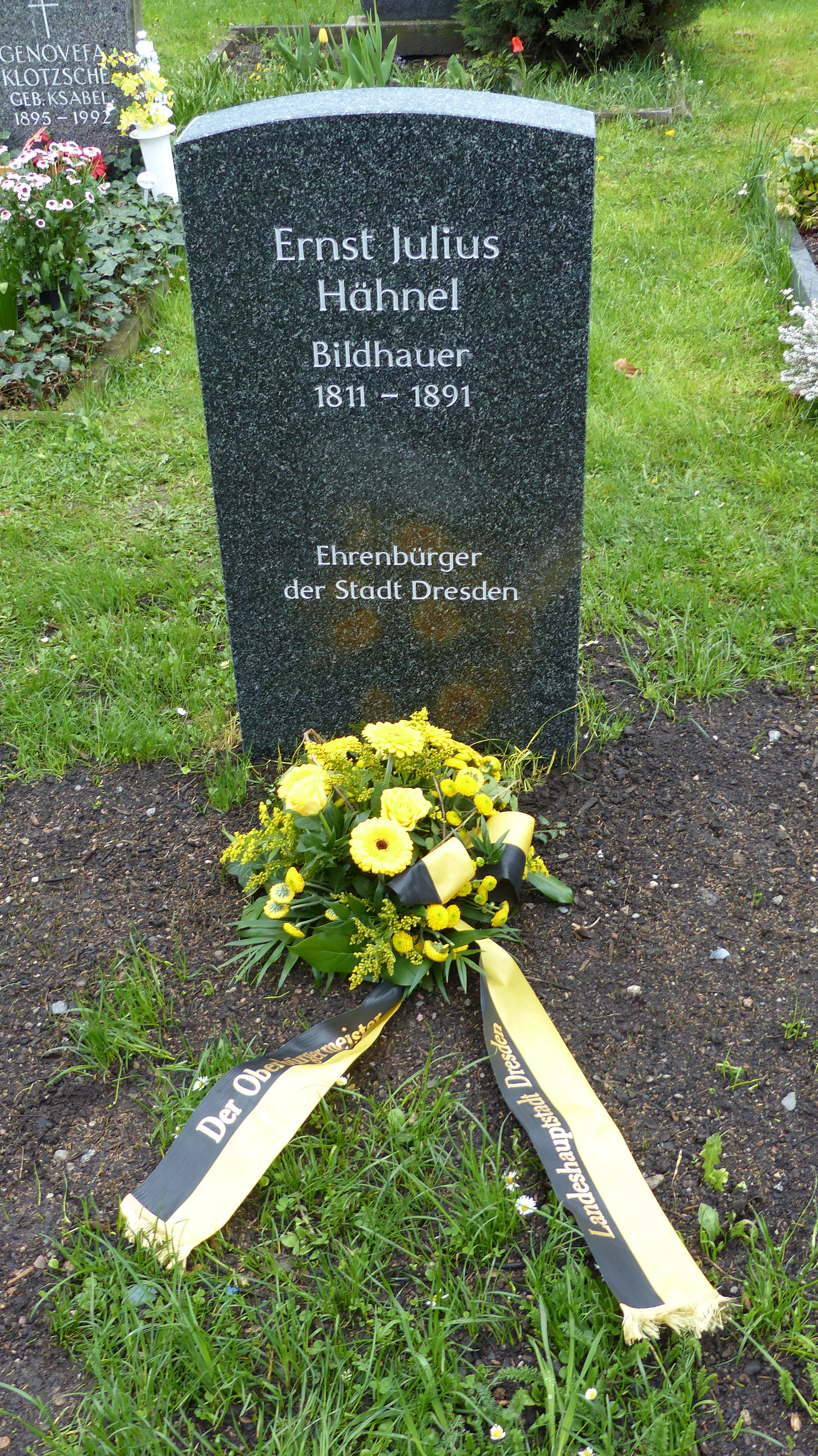
Replacement gravestone for Ernst Hähnel in the Old Catholic Cemetery in Dresden

Ernst Julius Hähnel (9 March 1811 – 22 May 1891) was a German sculptor and Professor at the Dresden Academy of Fine Arts.

He is especially remembered for his public statuary. His works of art can be admired throughout Germany.

== Life ==
He was born in Dresden, then part of the Kingdom of Saxony, on 9 March 1811.

He originally studied architecture at the Dresden Academy then, in 1826, went to the Academy of Fine Arts, Munich, where he remained until 1831 and later switched to sculpture after taking classes with Ernst Rietschel and Ludwig Schwanthaler. He took a study trip to Rome and Florence and returned to Munich, living there from 1835 to 1838, when he was appointed to the Dresden Academy.

Upon arriving there, Gottfried Semper entrusted him with the preparation of some sculptures for the new Semperoper (Opera House). In 1845, he created the Beethoven Monument in Bonn, the work which made him famous. He became a full Professor at the Dresden Academy in 1848. Johannes Schilling and Christian Behrens were among his best-known students.

In 1859, he received an Honorary Doctorate from the University of Leipzig and, in 1883, became an Honorary citizen of Dresden.

He died on 22 May 1891 and is buried in the Old Catholic Cemetery in south Dresden. The original grave was removed due to the German practice of requiring ongoing payments by relatives not being paid, but was replaced by a new grave in April 2016.

== Selected works ==
- 1867: Statue of King Frederick Augustus II of Saxony in Dresden
- 1874: Equestrian statue of Count Frederick William, Duke of Brunswick-Wolfenbüttel in Braunschweig
- 1874: Plaque of Ludwig Tieck at the former location of his home near the Altmarkt in Dresden
Beethoven Monument, Bonn (1845)

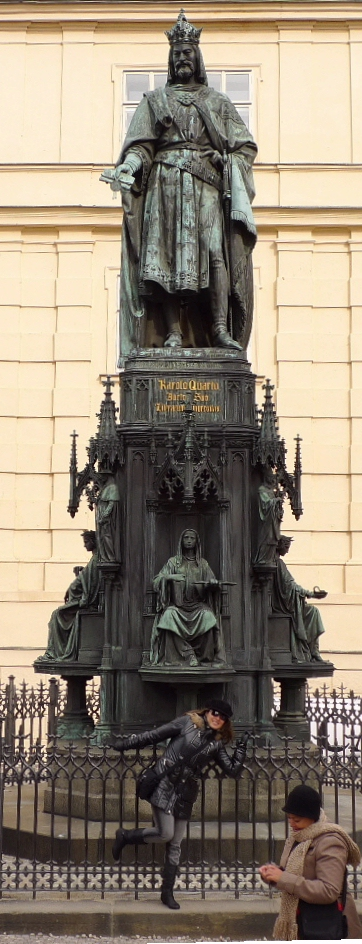
Emperor Charles IV in Prague (1848)

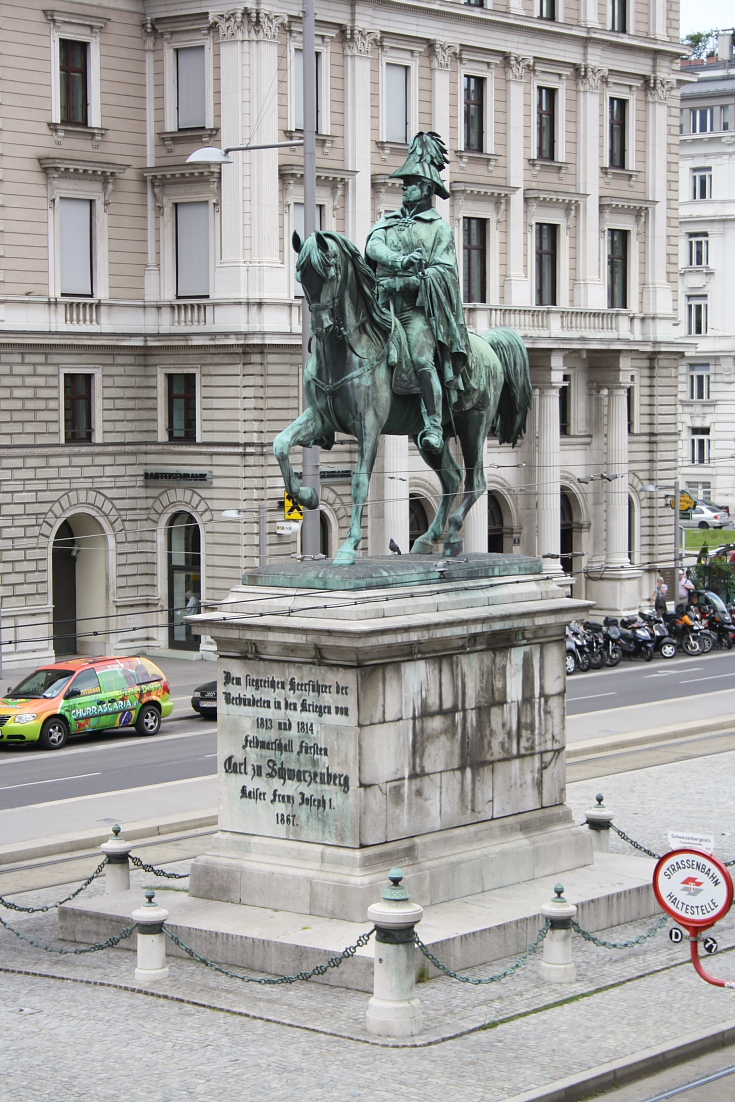
Equestrian statue of Karl Philipp Fürst zu Schwarzenberg in Vienna (1867)

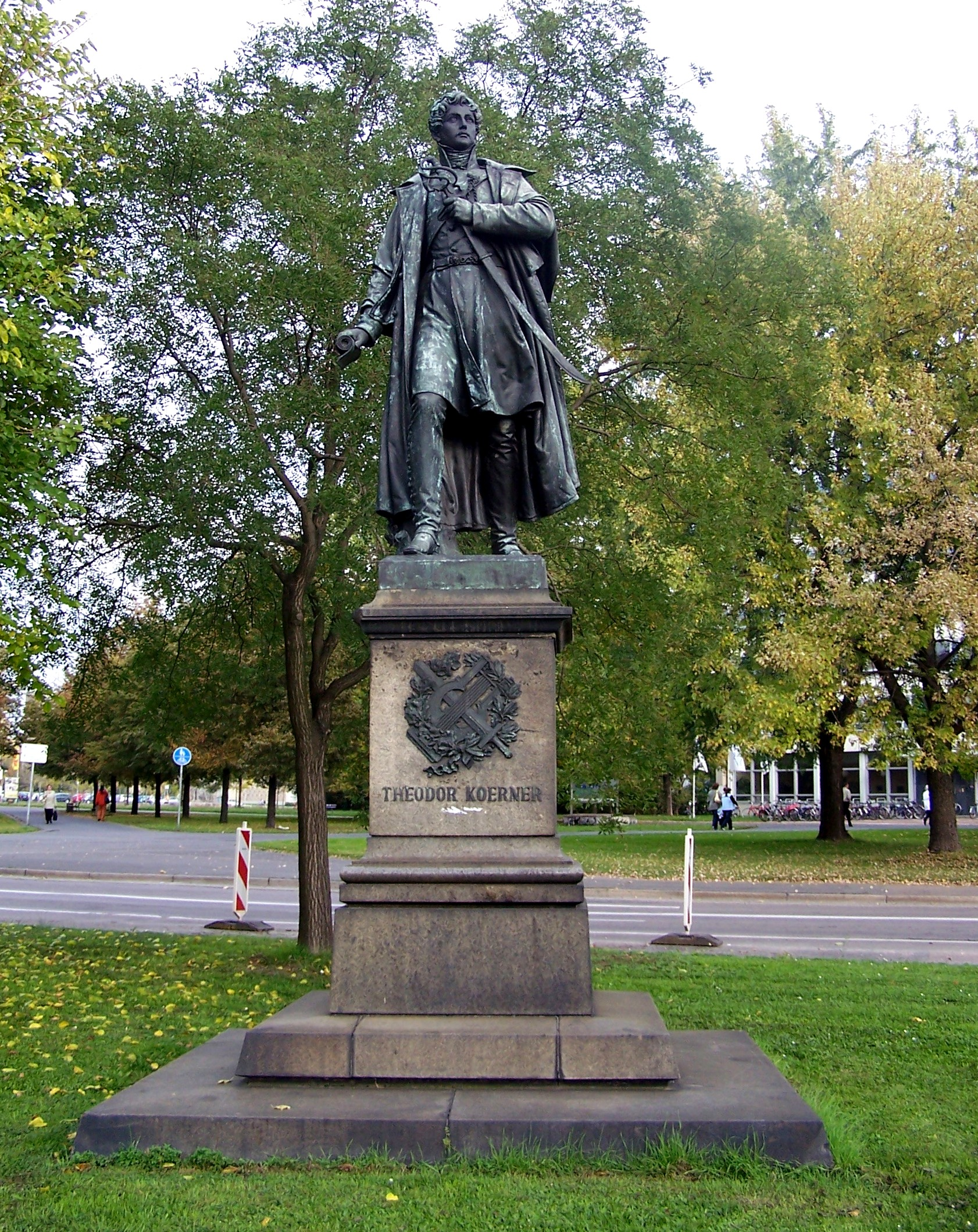
Theodor Körner Monument in Dresden (1871)

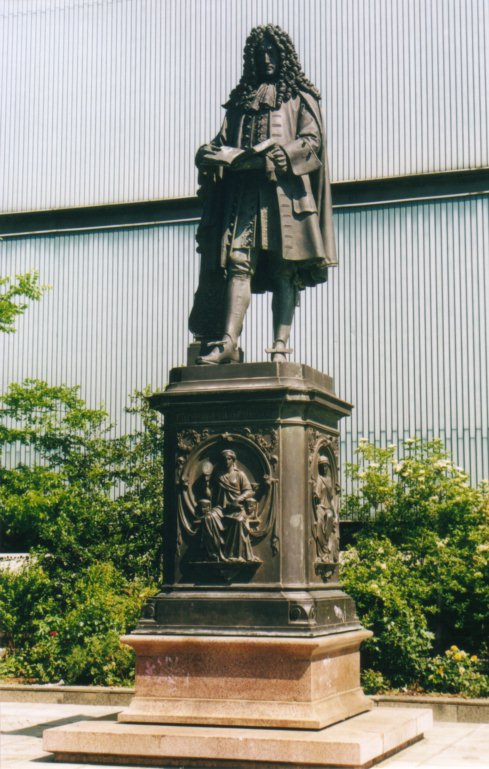
Leibniz Monument in Leipzig (1883)

=== Other notable works ===
- Raphael, Albertinum, Dresden
