= Central Conservatory of Music =

National music college in Beijing, China

- 中央音乐学院
- Motto: 勤奋，求实，团结，进取
- Motto in English: Diligent, looking for truth, organization, advance
- Type: Public
- Established: 1950; 76 years ago
- President: Yu Feng
- Academic staff: 340
- Students: 1897
- Undergraduates: 1469
- Postgraduates: 360
- Doctoral students: 69
- Location: Beijing, China; 39.901°N 116.353°E
- Website: www.ccom.edu.cn

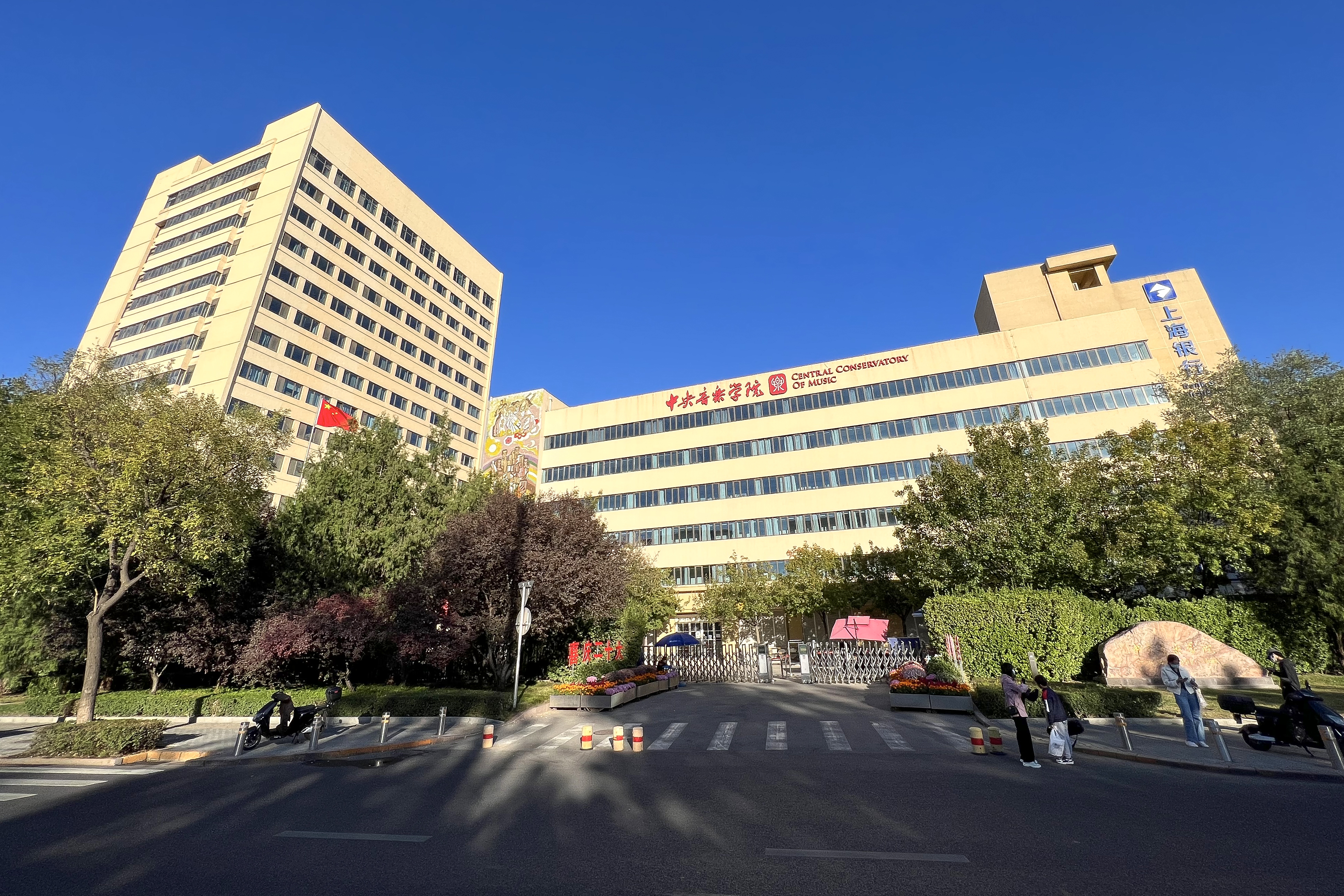
West gate

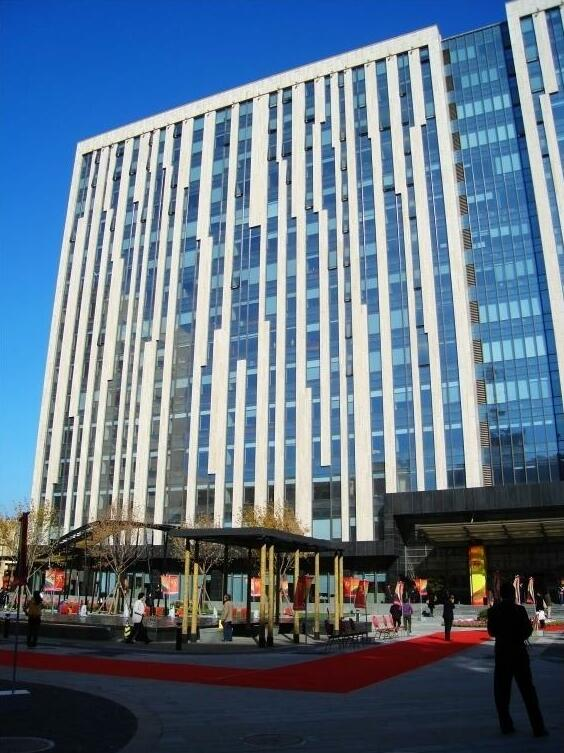
Main Building of the Central Conservatory of Music

Central Conservatory of Music
- Chinese: 中央音乐学院
- Simplified Chinese: 中央音乐学院
- Traditional Chinese: 中央音樂學院
Transcriptions
Standard Mandarin
- Hanyu Pinyin: ZhōngYāng YīnYuè XuéYuàn
- Yale Romanization: ZhūngYāng YīnYwè SywéYwàn

The Central Conservatory of Music (CCOM; Chinese: 中央音乐学院; pinyin: Zhōngyāng Yīnyuè Xuéyuàn) is the national music academy of China, located in Beijing. It is affiliated with the Ministry of Education. The academy is part of Project 211 and the Double First-Class Construction.

== Overview ==
Founded in 1950 the conservatory offers courses to both citizens and foreign students. The school caters to all levels from primary to postgraduate. Undergraduate programmes of four or five years are offered in composition, conducting, musicology, voice and opera, piano, orchestral instruments and traditional Chinese musical instruments. There is a six-year middle school with courses in piano, orchestral instruments, traditional instruments and music theory and two primary schools cater to full-time and evening students. There is also an evening university for mature students.

In recent years, the conservatory has developed strong relationships with overseas institutions and individuals. Foreign musicians and scholars are frequently invited to teach or offer lectures at the conservatory which, in turn, sends its own faculty members and students to other countries to pursue further studies, lecture or give performances. Conservatory students and teachers participate in the China Youth Symphony Orchestra, the Chinese Traditional Musical Instruments Ensemble, the Conservatory Students Chorus, the Middle School Students Orchestra, and the Primary School Students Performing Group.

The conservatory campus covers 53,000 square metres. The Conservatory Music Library accommodates over 500,000 volumes and is the largest of its kind in China. The conservatory also owns over 500 pianos and a large number of musical instruments. Educational facilities include an electronic music studio with advanced recording and video equipment and a violin workshop. New: 1 Oberlinger-organ from Germany Nov. 2013

The conservatory publishes the Journal of the Central Conservatory of Music. It is generally considered to be the top Chinese academic journal in the field of musicology.

== Degrees offered ==
Bachelor's degrees (4 years)

- Musicology (5 years)
- Composition and Compositional Theory (5 years)
- Vocal Singing (5 years)
- Conducting (5 years)
- Keyboard Instruments Performance
- Wind and Stringed (Percussional) Instruments Performance
- Chinese Musical Instruments Performance
- The Arts of Instruments Making and Repair

Master's degrees (3 years)

- Musicology
- Composition and Compositional Theory
- Vocal Singing
- Conducting
- Keyboard Instruments Performance (4 years)
- Wind and Stringed (Percussional) Instruments Performance (4 years)
- Chinese Musical Instruments Performance (4 years)
- The Arts of Instruments Making and Repair (4 years)

Doctoral degrees (3 years)

- Musicology
- Composition and Compositional Theory

== Notable alumni ==
List of Notable Alumni
| Name | Nationality | Graduating Year |
|---|---|---|
| Wei Wei | Chinese | 1984 |
| Chen Yi | Chinese | |
| Ju Jin | Italian | |
| Liu Shikun | Chinese | |
| Lang Lang | Chinese | |
| Yizhuo Meng | Chinese | |
| Tan Dun | Chinese | 1981 |
| Arken Abdulla | Chinese | 2001 |
| Wu Man | Chinese | |
| Xiaoyong Chen | Chinese | 1985 |
| Ye Xiaogang | Chinese | 1983 |
| Yuja Wang | Chinese | |
| Zhang Dingyuan | Chinese | |
| Zhao Jiping | Chinese | |
| Zhou Long | Chinese | 1981 |
| Zhu Xiao-Mei | Chinese | |
| Vanessa-Mae | British | |
| Gao Hong | American | |
| Cheng Huihui | Chinese | |
| Zhang Lida (张丽达) | Chinese | |
| Natalie Ni Shi | Canadian | |
| Lang Yueting | Chinese | 2009 |
| Beibei Wang | Chinese | |
| Liang Wang | Chinese | |

== See also ==
- China Conservatory of Music
