= Stefan Schnabel =

German-born actor (1912–1999)

- Born: Stefan Artur Schnabel; February 2, 1912; Berlin, Germany
- Died: March 11, 1999 (aged 87); Rogaro, Italy
- Citizenship: United States
- Occupation: Actor
- Years active: 1933–1992
- Spouse: Marion Kohler (m. 1947)
- Parents: Artur Schnabel (father); Therese Schnabel (mother)
- Relatives: Karl Ulrich Schnabel (brother)

Stefan Artur Schnabel (February 2, 1912 – March 11, 1999) was a German-American actor who worked in theatre, radio, films and television. After moving to the United States in 1937 he became one of the original members of Orson Welles's Mercury Theatre repertory company. He portrayed Dr. Stephen Jackson on the CBS daytime TV series Guiding Light for 17 years.

== Biography ==
Stefan Artur Schnabel was born February 2, 1912, in Berlin, Germany. He was the younger son of classical pianist Artur Schnabel (who was Jewish) and contralto Therese Behr Schnabel. His older brother was pianist Karl Ulrich Schnabel.

"My father used to say that there was never a doorknob in our house that wasn't in somebody's hand," Schnabel said in a 1981 interview. "Both of my parents were musicians and teachers and so our house was always filled with pupils, and I would entertain them by dancing or doing something in pantomime since most of the pupils were foreigners." As a child Schnabel was assigned to teach the German language to his parents' American and Australian students. He had such proficiency in English that he was able to join The Old Vic repertory theatre company when his family emigrated to England after Hitler's rise to power. He studied with the Old Vic for four years. He made his debut in 1933 as an off-stage wind noise in The Tempest, and later played in Antony and Cleopatra (1934), Major Barbara (1935), As You Like It (1936), and the 1937 production of Hamlet starring Laurence Olivier.

In March 1937, Schnabel moved to New York and began working in radio. Among the first of the more than 5,000 radio shows on which he performed was The Shadow, starring Orson Welles. Schnabel joined Welles's Mercury Theatre repertory company and appeared as Metellus Cimber in its inaugural Broadway production, a landmark modern-dress production of Shakespeare's Julius Caesar (1937–38) that evoked Nazi Germany. When Welles created the CBS radio series, The Mercury Theatre on the Air, Schnabel performed on episodes including the legendary broadcast, "The War of the Worlds".

When Mercury Productions moved to the West Coast, Schnabel was one of the actors Welles cast in Heart of Darkness, the film he first proposed for RKO Pictures before settling instead on Citizen Kane. After elaborate pre-production the project never reached production because Welles was unable to sufficiently trim its budget to compensate for lost revenue in the wartime overseas market.

Schnabel made his screen debut in a subsequent Mercury production, the 1943 film, Journey into Fear. However, Schnabel was filmed in 1933 in a work that was completed in 2016 under the title Das Kalte Herz (The Cold Heart). He was in more than 60 films, including The Iron Curtain (1948), Houdini (1953), The Counterfeit Traitor (1962), Firefox (1982) and Green Card (1990).

Schnabel became a naturalized U.S. citizen in August 1941. He served with the U.S Army's Office of Strategic Services during World War II, broadcasting propaganda messages to his native Germany and working with the underground in England, Germany, France and the Netherlands. He was awarded a Certificate of Merit.

After his war service Schnabel performed in the Orson Welles–Cole Porter Broadway musical extravaganza, Around the World (1946). His other stage credits include the 1938 Mercury Theatre production of The Shoemaker's Holiday; Eva Le Gallienne's 1944 revival of The Cherry Orchard; Peter Ustinov's Love of Four Colonels (1953); and A Very Rich Woman (1965) by Ruth Gordon. He portrayed physicist Hans Bethe in In the Matter of J. Robert Oppenheimer (1969), appeared in Tom Stoppard's adaptation of Schnitzler's Undiscovered Country (1981), and was again on Broadway in Mike Nichols's production of Andrew Bergman's Social Security (1986).

After appearing in more than 100 prestigious television dramas, Schnabel became best known for portraying Dr. Stephen Jackson for 17 years (April 21, 1966–81) on the CBS-TV soap opera, Guiding Light.

"When I first became Dr. Jackson, he was a curmudgeon, a very gruff character with a heart of gold. Now I am exclusively good and sweet," Schnabel told The New York Times in 1981. "A soap opera is the only dramatic form I know where you can develop a character for 25 years. … As an actor, if your role on a soap opera is long-lasting, it's possibly the only financial security you know, and it enables you to more or less pick and choose what you want to do with the rest of your time."

Schnabel and actress Marion Kohler, a fellow member of the Around the World cast, were married in 1947. They lived in Rowayton, Connecticut, for 45 years, founded the Rainbow Theater in Norwalk, and appeared there together in plays including T. S. Eliot's The Confidential Clerk and Friedrich Dürrenmatt's The Physicists. In 1992 the couple moved to Rogaro, Italy where Schnabel died on March 11, 1999, aged 87, following a heart attack.

== Cultural references ==
Schnabel, in his role as the conspirator Metellus Cimber, was played by Rhodri Orders in the 2008 movie Me and Orson Welles.

== Filmography ==
Year	Title	Role	Notes
1943	Journey into Fear	Translator For Ship's Captain	
1948	The Iron Curtain	Colonel Ilya Ranov	
1949	Law of the Barbary Coast	Alexis Boralof	
1949	Barbary Pirate	Yusof, The Bey of Tripoli	
1952	Diplomatic Courier	Rasumny Platov	
1953	Houdini	German Prosecuting Attorney	
1956	Crowded Paradise	Big Man	
1957	The 27th Day	Soviet General	
1958	The Mugger	"Fats" Donner	
1958	Majestät auf Abwegen	Unknown	
1960	Ça va être ta fête	Bragarian	
1961	Town Without Pity	Unknown	
1961	The Secret Ways	Border Official	
1961	The Big Show	Lawyer	
1961	Question 7	Unknown	
1961	The Phony American	Unknown	
1962	Alfred Hitchcock Presents	Siani	Season 7 Episode 35: "The Children of Alda Nuova"
1962	The Counterfeit Traitor	Gestapo Agent At Funeral	
1962	Two Weeks in Another Town	Zeno	
1962	Freud: The Secret Passion	Chairman of Medical Profession In Vienna	Uncredited
1963	The Ugly American	Andrei Krupitzyn	
1963	Rampage	Sakai Chief	
1964	No Survivors, Please	Unknown	
1975	The Happy Hooker	Elderly Gentleman	
1976	Blood Bath	Unknown	
1982	Firefox	First Secretary	
1983	Lovesick	Gunnar Bergsen, M.D.	
1987	Anna	Professor	
1988	Dracula's Widow	Helsing	
1990	Green Card	Party Guest #2	
1992	Ferien mit Silvester	Unknown	
1933/2016	Das Kalte Herz (The Cold Heart)	Holländer-Michel	(first film role) filmed in 1933, completed in 2016
