= Variations sérieuses =

Composition for piano by Felix Mendelssohn

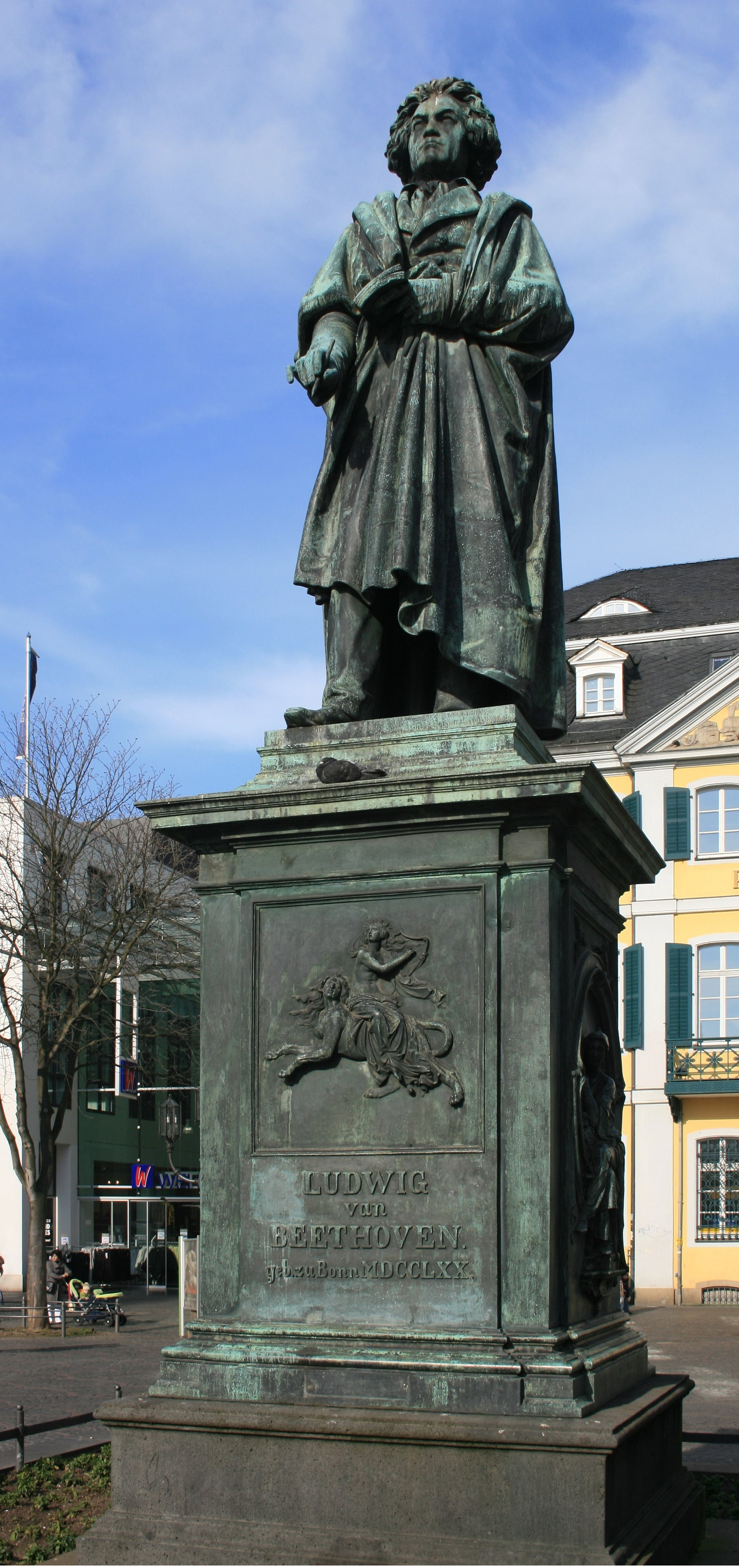
Beethoven Monument in Bonn

Variations sérieuses, Op. 54, MWV U 156, is a composition for solo piano by Felix Mendelssohn consisting of a theme in D minor and 17 variations. It was completed on 4 June 1841. A typical performance lasts about eleven minutes.

The work was written as part of a campaign to raise funds for the erection of a large bronze statue of Ludwig van Beethoven in his home town of Bonn. The publisher Pietro Mechetti asked Mendelssohn to contribute to a 'Beethoven Album', published in January 1842, which also included pieces by Liszt, Chopin, Moscheles and others, of which the proceeds would go to the Monument. (Schumann's Fantasie in C was the final result of a work originally intended for the same purpose).

Mendelssohn is known to have written three sets of piano variations, but only this one was published during his lifetime.

The autograph manuscript of the set is preserved in the Jagiellonian Library.

Many of the variations require a virtuoso technique. Mendelssohn's good friend Ignaz Moscheles stated "I play the Variations sérieuses again and again, each time I enjoy the beauty again." Ferruccio Busoni also liked the work very much. Many pianists have recorded it, including Vladimir Horowitz, Sviatoslav Richter, Alicia de Larrocha, Rena Kyriakou, Vladimir Sofronitsky and Murray Perahia.

In 2009, Austrian composer Christoph Herndler composed "variations sérieuses variation after Mendelssohn Op. 54", a piece for organ or piano that brings together all the notes of the theme from Mendelssohn’s composition in a virtuosic tremolo passage played by both hands, while significantly stretching out the duration.

== Structure ==
Variations sérieuses, Op. 54
Felix Mendelssohn
Performed live by Mark Gasser

1. Theme: Andante sostenuto
2. Variation 1
3. Variation 2: Un poco più animato
4. Variation 3: Più animato
5. Variation 4
6. Variation 5: Agitato
7. Variation 6: A tempo
8. Variation 7: Con fuoco
9. Variation 8: Allegro vivace
10. Variation 9
11. Variation 10: Moderato
12. Variation 11: Cantabile
13. Variation 12: Tempo del Tema
14. Variation 13: Sempre assai leggiero
15. Variation 14: Adagio
16. Variation 15: Poco a poco più agitato
17. Variation 16: Allegro vivace
18. Variation 17
19. Coda: Presto
