= Zhang Dingyuan =

Chinese classical pianist (born 1976)

Zhang Dingyuan 张玎苑
- Born: 1976 (age 49–50); Xi'an, China
- Origin: Berlin
- Genre: Classical music
- Occupation: Musician
- Instrument: Piano

Zhang Dingyuan (Chinese: 张玎苑; pinyin: Zhāng Dīngyuàn; born 1976) is a Chinese pianist.

Zhang was born in Xi'an, Shaanxi. She started to play piano at the age of 3 and was later admitted to the Central Conservatory of Music in Beijing to study piano performance under the tutelage of Professors Zhong Hui, Zhao Pingguo and Chen Bigang. After graduation, she went on to study piano performance under Professor Rainer Becker at the Berlin University of the Arts and received the Master of Music degree in 2003 and the Konzertexamen diploma in piano performance in 2008. She was the recipient of prestigious Paul Hindemith Scholarship from 2001 to 2004.

Zhang has won a number of piano competition awards including the Chinese Piano Composition Award in 1996, the second prize in the Mi-Duo Piano Competition in 1996, and the third prize in the Artur Schnabel Piano Competition in 2001. From 1997 to 1998 she had performance tours in Hong Kong, Beijing, Tianjin and throughout China with famed Chinese musicians such as Ma Xiang-Hua and Song Fei and recorded several CDs. She performed with the Berlin Philharmonic extensively from 2001 to 2004. She frequently gave piano recitals and performed at Berliner Philharmonie, Konzerthaus Berlin and Steinway Haus.

Currently she is an associate professor in piano at the East China Normal University in Shanghai and serves as the director of piano division in the music department of the university. In 2026, Zhang proposed a preliminary Neuro-Yijing Model that connects the Chinese aesthetic concept of ‘‘yijing’’ with neuroaesthetics and music cognition.
