= Sam Raphling =

American classical composer

Sam Raphling (March 19, 1910, Fort Worth, Texas - January 8, 1988, New York City) was an American composer and pianist. He studied under Artur Schnabel at the University of Michigan. He wrote in a variety of musical genres, including orchestral works Concerto pour trompette et orchestre à cordes, chamber pieces, and vocal art songs; the latter of which remain his most notable legacy. Also of note is his orchestral suite Dance of the Chassidic and his piano arrangements of Stravinsky's The Rite of Spring and The Firebird, and Prokofiev's Scythian Suite. He wrote two children's operas with librettist James V. Hatch. As a pianist he made a number of recording on the RCA Victor label.
