= Jenny Lin =

Taiwanese-born American pianist

- Genre: Classical
- Occupation: Musician
- Instrument: Piano
- Labels: Hänssler Classic, Steinway & Sons, Koch/E1, BIS Records, Albany Records, Sunrise Records
- Website: www.jennylin.net

Jenny Lin (born 1973) is a Taiwanese-born American pianist.

== Biography ==
She was born in Taiwan, and raised in Austria and the United States. She began her piano studies at the age of 4. At age 10, she was accepted into the Hochschule für Musik in Vienna, Austria, in the studio of Noel Flores. At age 14, she immigrated to the United States, attended the National Cathedral School in Washington, D.C., and Peabody Conservatory of Music in Baltimore, studying with Julian Martin. She received an Artist Diploma from Peabody and also holds a bachelor's degree in German Literature from Johns Hopkins University. After college, she moved to Geneva, Switzerland, to study with the pianist Dominique Weber. She has also worked with Richard Goode and Blanca Uribe in New York, and with Leon Fleisher, Dimitri Bashkirov and Andreas Staier at the Fondazione Internazionale per il pianoforte in Cadenabbia, Italy.

Lin was the Executive Director of the Manchester Music Festival, now currently serving as Director of Music at the Phillips Collection in Washington DC.

== Discography ==
- Artur Schnabel: complete Vocal Music, with contralto Sara Couden (2022 Steinway & Sons)
- Giya Kancheli: Simple Music (2021 Steinway & Sons)
- Frederic Chopin: complete Piano Nocturnes (2018 Steinway & Sons)
- Artur Schnabel: complete Piano Music (2018 Steinway & Sons)
- Philip Glass: complete Piano Etudes (2018 Steinway & Sons)
- Sergei Prokofiev and Kirill Zaborov: piano solo works (2017 Steinway & Sons)
- "Melody's Mostly Musical Day" (2016 Steinway & Sons)
- "The Spirio Sessions" 2-piano works with Uri Caine (2015 Steinway & Sons)
- Igor Stravinsky Solo Piano Works (2014 Steinway & Sons)
- "Night Stories: Nocturnes" (2014 Hänssler Classic)
- "17 Windows": Music of David Wolfson (2013 Albany Records)
- "Get Happy": Broadway Song Arrangements by pianists (2012 Steinway & Sons)
- Xavier Montsalvatge: Concerto Breve (2011 Hänssler Classic)
- Silent Music: Federico Mompou Musica Callada (2011 Steinway & Sons)
- Ma Shui-Long: Piano Concerto (2010 National Symphony Orchestra of Taiwan)
- Dmitri Shostakovich: Preludes and Fugues Op. 87 (2010 Hänssler Classic)
- "Insomnimania": (2009 Koch/E1)
- Valentin Silvestrov: Chamber Works (2009 Koch/E1)
- Ernest Bloch: works for piano and orchestra (2008 Hänssler Classic)
- "Nostalgia": Valentin Silvestrov Solo Piano works (2007 Hänssler Classic)
- "The Eleventh Finger": (2007 Koch/E1)
- "Preludes to a Revolution": Russian Piano Preludes (1905–22) (2006 Hänssler Classic)
- Ma Yo-Dao: Piano Suite (2006 Poem Culture Records)
- Ruth Crawfold Seeger: Complete Piano Works (2005 BIS Records)
- Guan Xia: Piano Suite (2004 Poem Culture Records)
- "Chinoiserie": (2002 BIS Records)
- Liszt Sonata and Schumann Fantasie: (2000 Sunrise Records)

== See also ==
- Chinese people in New York City
- Taiwanese people in New York City
