= Artur Schnabel Piano Competition =

Annual piano competition in Berlin

The Artur Schnabel Wettbewerb is an intern piano competition organized by the Berlin University of the Arts since 1986. While aimed to the institution's alumni, in recent editions pianists under the Hochschule für Musik Hanns Eisler have joined it.

== Palmares ==
Prize Winners
Year	1st Prize	2nd Prize	3rd Prize	Special Prize
1986	(South Korea) Hie-Yon Choi	(Germany) Andras Vermesy	Iwan König (Japan) Emiko Kumagai	
1987	not awarded	(Japan) Nobuko Kondo (Japan) Yoko Saito (ex-a.)	(South Korea) Jeong-Won Ham	(Germany) Sebastian Störmer
1989	(Japan) Kyoko Tabe	(South Korea) Sang-Jean Shin	(South Korea) Jeong-Won Ham	(Germany) Thoralf Gütter (Japan) Tomoko Takahashi
1990	(Germany) Markus Groh	(Belgium) Jan Michiels (Germany) Corinna Söller (ex-a.)	(Japan) Susumu Aoyagi	
1992	(Romania) Daniel Goiti	(South Korea) Kyoung-Ah Choi	(Japan) Tomoko Takahashi	(Russia) Maria Ivanova (Japan) Yukiko Shioda
1994	(Romania) (Germany) Cristina Marton	(Japan) Yukiko Shioda	(Germany) Tachmina Chmelnitzki (Norway) Håvard Gimse (ex-a.)	
1995	(Latvia) Karina Jermaka	(Japan) Noriko Ishiguro	(Japan) Keiko Ishitobi (Norway) Stefan Veselka (ex-a.)	
1997	(Japan) Masaru Okada	(Japan) Kiai Nara	(South Korea) Yun-Hee Jung (South Korea) Jin-Son Kim (ex-a.)	
1998	(Germany) Severin von Eckardstein	(Russia) Maria Roumiantseva	not awarded	(Japan) Rie Okamura (Israel) Oleg Roshin
2000	not awarded	(Uzbekistan) Ulugbek Palvanov	(Russia) Ekaterina Roumiantseva (France) Benoît Ziegler	
2001	(Hungary) Gergely Bogányi	(Japan) Norie Takahashi	(Romania) Mădălina Pașol de Martin (China) Dingyuan Zhang	
2002	not awarded	(Turkey) Emre Eliver (Ukraine) Olga Monakh (Uzbekistan) Ulugbek Palvanov	void	(Russia) Alina Luschtschizkaja
2004	(Germany) Benjamin Moser (Russia) Alexander Yakovlev (ex-a.)	(Japan) Motoi Kawashima	(Japan) Naoko Fukumoto (China) Huijing Han	
2005	(South Korea) Mi-Yeon Lee	(Belgium) Lucas Blondeel	(Japan) Yohei Wakioka	(Japan) Akiko Nikami (Taiwan) Li-Chun Su
2007	(Germany) Eugen Dietrich (Taiwan) Li-Chun Su (ex-a.)	(South Korea) Eun-Young Seo	void	
