= Beethoven Monument =

Statue in Bonn, Germany

Coordinates: 50°44′03″N 7°05′57″E

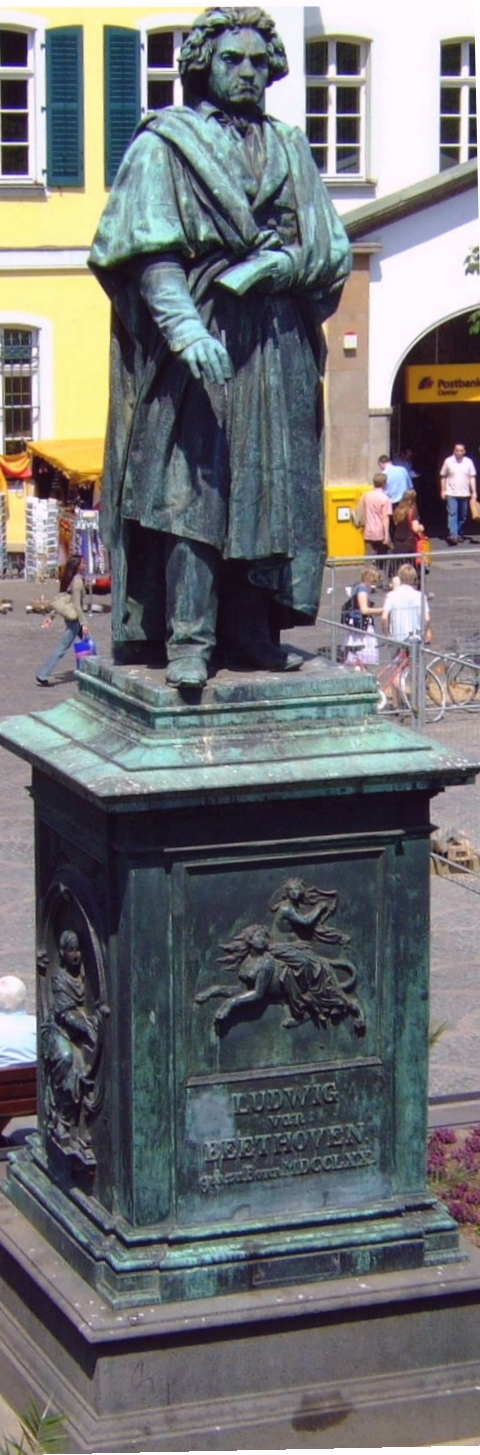
Beethoven Monument

The Beethoven Monument is a large bronze statue of Ludwig van Beethoven that stands on the Münsterplatz in Bonn, Beethoven's birthplace. It was unveiled on 12 August 1845, in honour of the 75th anniversary of the composer's birth.

== Background ==
Heinrich Carl Breidenstein (1796–1876) was Germany's first professor of musicology. He had held a post at Bonn University since 1823. In 1828 he had first expressed the idea of a monument to Beethoven in his native town. In 1832 he wrote an article suggesting the idea, "or, even better, a living memorial, one dedicated to art, Bildung, education, etc."

Up to that time it had not been German or Austrian practice to erect statues of great cultural figures. Friedrich Schiller had to wait until 1839; the first one of Mozart (in Salzburg, Austria) was not unveiled until 1842; and the first one of Beethoven in Vienna, the city he spent most time in, was most associated with, and died in, was not created until 1880.

On 17 December 1835, the "Bonn Association for the Beethoven Monument", headed by the famous translator of Shakespeare, August Wilhelm Schlegel, issued a call for a permanent memorial to Beethoven, which was sent to all the principal musical publications in Germany, France, and England. King Ludwig I of Bavaria was enthusiastic, but the response was otherwise not very promising: in Paris, Luigi Cherubini promised a special fund-raising concert but later changed his mind; in London, Beethoven's friend Sir George Smart and Ignaz Moscheles gave a benefit concert at the Drury Lane Theatre, including the Ode to Joy from the Ninth Symphony, but it was poorly attended.

Franz Liszt involved himself in the project in October 1839 when it became clear it was in danger of foundering through lack of financial support. Till then, the French contributions had totalled less than 425 francs; Liszt's own personal donation exceeded 10,000 francs. He contributed his advocacy and also his personal energies in concerts and recitals, the proceeds of which went towards the construction fund. One such concert was his last public appearance with Frédéric Chopin, a pair of piano duo concerts held at the Salle Pleyel and the Conservatoire de Paris on 25 and 26 April 1841.

The sole condition of Liszt's involvement was that the sculptor of the statue of Beethoven should be the Italian, Lorenzo Bartolini. In the event, the contract was awarded to a German, Ernst Julius Hähnel (1811–1891). The casting was done by Jakob Daniel Burgschmiet of Nuremberg.

Liszt returned to the concert stage for this purpose; he had earlier retired to compose and spend time with his family. He also wrote a special work for occasion of the unveiling, Festival Cantata for the Inauguration of the Beethoven Monument in Bonn, S.67 (Festkantate zur Enthüllung des Beethoven-Denkmals in Bonn).

Other musicians had been involved earlier: Robert Schumann offered to write a "Grande Sonate", have it published with gold trim and black binding, and use the proceeds of the sale for the building fund. His Obolen auf Beethovens Monument: Ruinen, Trophäen, Palmen: grosse Sonate für das Pianoforte für Beethovens Denkmal, von Florestan und Eusebius (Small Contribution to Beethoven’s Monument: Ruins, Trophies, Palms: Grand Sonata for the Pianoforte for Beethoven’s Memorial, by Florestan and Eusebius) underwent some name changes. His publishers did not accept it in 1836, and so he revised it and had it published in 1839 as his Fantasie in C, Op. 17, with a dedication to Liszt. In the first movement, Schumann possibly alludes to a theme from Beethoven's song cycle An die ferne Geliebte (To the Distant Beloved) which if true, was also an allusion to his own "distant beloved", Clara Wieck, who was then separated from him in Paris, by order of her father Friedrich Wieck. In 1841 Felix Mendelssohn wrote his Variations sérieuses in D minor for the project.

The unveiling was originally scheduled for 6 August 1843, but was postponed to 12 August 1845.

On 12 May 1845, Schlegel died. His place as head of the organising committee was taken by the instigator of the idea, Heinrich Breidenstein.

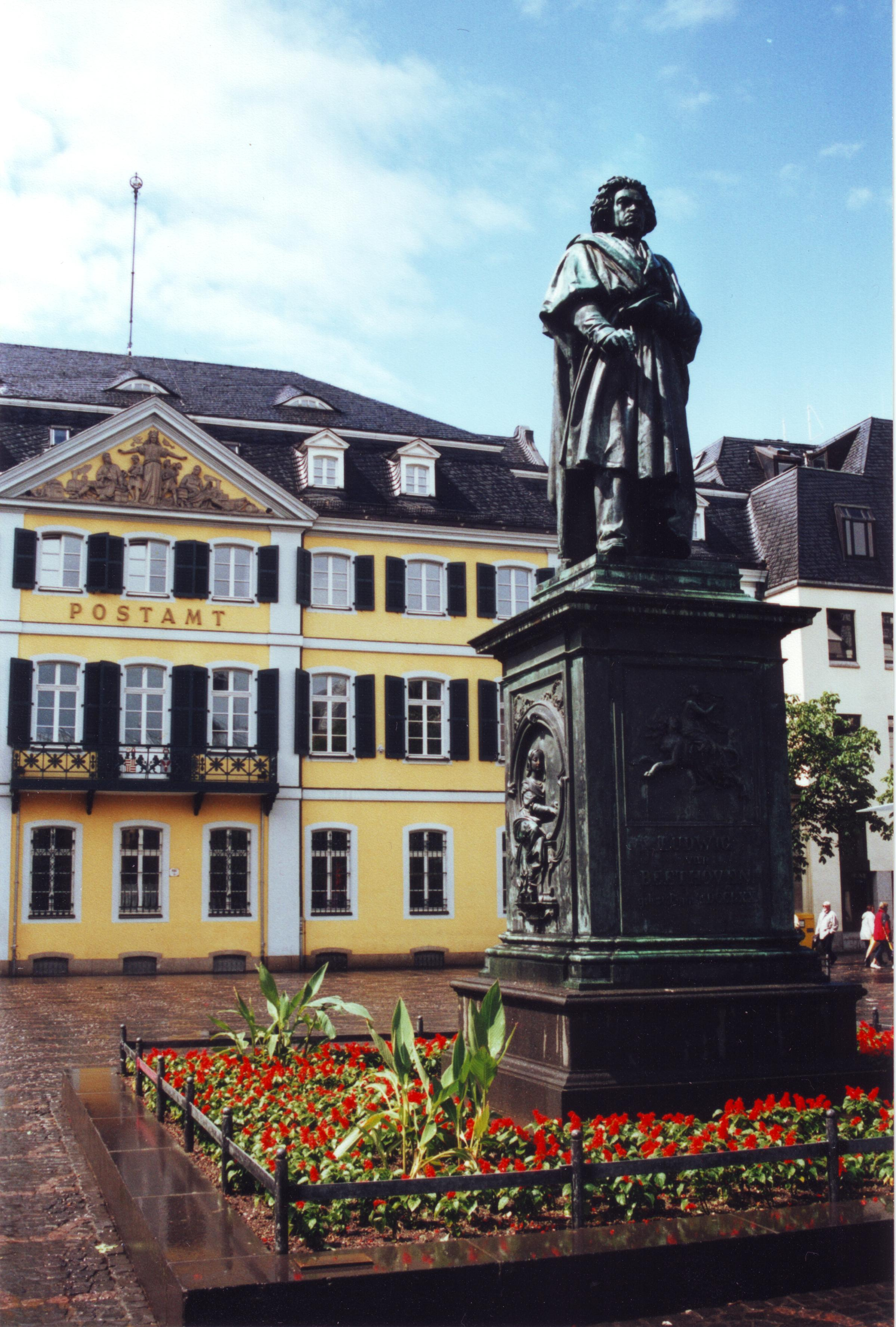
Beethoven Monument

== Hasty building of the Beethoven Hall ==
The official unveiling of the Beethoven Monument was to be the high point of a 3-day Beethoven Festival. A month before the festival was due to commence, there was not a suitable venue to hold the expected 3,000 attendees. At Liszt's urgings, and only after he offered to bear the full cost himself, the committee engaged an architect and builders to construct the Beethoven Hall. By the time they finally started, they had less than two weeks to do this, and had to work around the clock to finish it on time.

Fortunately, a little more attention had been paid to the musicians who were to perform the music. The orchestra was made up of players from provincial orchestras from the area. The double basses included the world famous Domenico Dragonetti, who had known Beethoven and was then 82 years old, but was still an able performer. He died less than a year later.

== Opening celebrations ==
Statue in Bonn by Ernst Julius Hähnel

The Beethovenfest (Beethoven Festival) started on Sunday 10 August 1845. Louis Spohr, who had known Beethoven, conducted the Missa solemnis and the 9th Symphony that evening.

On the morning of the unveiling, Tuesday 12 August, the Mass in C major was performed in the Cathedral. Then the official unveiling was held. It was attended by a large number of prominent figures: King Frederick William IV of Prussia and his consort; Queen Victoria (as part of her first continental visit since acceding to the throne 8 years earlier) and Prince Albert; Archduke Friedrich of Austria; the composers Hector Berlioz, Giacomo Meyerbeer, Ignaz Moscheles and Félicien David; the conductors Charles Hallé and Sir George Smart; the baritones Josef Staudigl and Johann Baptist Pischek (1814-1873); the sopranos Jenny Lind and Pauline Viardot; and Lola Montez. Robert Schumann and Felix Mendelssohn, who had both written major works for the piano to raise funds for the monument, were unable to be present. Frédéric Chopin declined to attend as he detested bombastic public ceremonial. Richard Wagner did not attend, but he was certainly aware of the event, as he wrote to Liszt a week before the opening, proposing the erection of a similar statue to Carl Maria von Weber in Dresden. A parchment signed by all the visiting dignitaries was sealed in a lead casket inside the monument.

This was followed by an afternoon concert: Liszt played the Emperor Concerto and conducted the Fifth Symphony, and Spohr led the Coriolan Overture, an aria from the oratorio Christ on the Mount of Olives, and the quartet and finale from Fidelio. It was originally proposed that Berlioz's Requiem would be played; Berlioz insisted that he, and only he, conduct the work if it were to be played at all, but this did not please the Bonn committee, so the plan was dropped. That evening there was a spectacular fireworks display.

The next day, Wednesday 13 August, there was a concert lasting four hours: it included Liszt's Festival Cantata for the Inauguration of the Beethoven Monument in Bonn (given twice, once without the royal guests, and again after their arrival), Beethoven's Egmont overture, a piano concerto by Weber, Leonora’s aria from Fidelio, a Mendelssohn aria, and the song Adelaide. This was followed by a banquet for 550 guests at the Hotel Der Stern. The banquet was disrupted by the behaviour of Lola Montez, who danced on a table and embarrassed Liszt by insisting she was his guest at the celebrations and demanding a seat appropriate to her claimed status, thus upsetting a pre-organised seating arrangement. This scandalised the Bonn authorities, and it redounded to Liszt himself, so much so that when Beethoven's centenary was celebrated in Bonn in 1870, he was not invited to attend.

== The monument itself ==
Sir George Smart declared the facial features of the statue a good likeness of Beethoven, as did Ignaz Moscheles. But Beethoven's assistant Anton Schindler was contemptuous of it.

== Restoration ==
The statue was removed from its plinth for restoration and cleaning in January 2022. The work took six months.
