= Huihui Cheng =

Chinese composer and pianist

- Born: 1985 (age 40–41); Wuchang, Heilongjiang, China
- Occupation: Composer
- Instrument: Piano

Huihui Cheng (Chinese: 程慧惠, born 1985) is a Chinese composer and pianist.

== Early life and education ==
Cheng was born in Wuchang, a district in the Heilongjiang province, northeastern China. She started playing piano at a young age and eventually composed her first piece at the age of nine. At the age of fourteen, she attended the middle school of Central Conservatory of Music, a college for musically-gifted children, after taking piano and composition lessons from Weiping Xie. She studied composition and completed her bachelor's and master's degree at Central Conservatory of Music. She later studied electronic composition at State University of Music and Performing Arts, in Stuttgart, Germany. In 2015/2016, she attended the IRCAM Composition Cursus in Paris, by Héctor Parra and Grégoire Lorieux.

== Career ==
Cheng's works have been performed at different international music festivals, including the 2005 Beijing Modern Music Festival, the 2008 Munich Biennale, and the 2009 and 2013 Tongyeong International Music Festival in Korea. Some other music festivals are Donaueschinger Musiktage "Next Generation," Wien Modern Festival, ECLAT Festival Stuttgart and Rainy Days Festival Luxemburg.

Cheng uses voice, instruments, electronics and theatrical concepts in her works.
