= Artur Schnabel =

Austrian pianist (1882–1951)

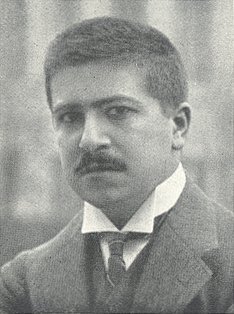
- Schnabel c. 1906
- Born: 17 April 1882; Kunzendorf, Austria-Hungary (now Lipnik, Poland)
- Died: 15 August 1951 (aged 69); Axenstein, Switzerland
- Resting place: Schwyz, Switzerland
- Occupations: Pianist and composer

Artur Schnabel (17 April 1882 – 15 August 1951) was an Austrian-born classical pianist, composer and pedagogue. Schnabel was known for his intellectual seriousness as a musician, avoiding pure technical bravura. Among the 20th century's most respected and important pianists, his playing displayed marked vitality, profundity and spirituality in the Austro-German classics, particularly the works of Beethoven, Schubert and Mozart.

Music critic Harold C. Schonberg described Schnabel as "the man who invented Beethoven". Between 1932 and 1935, he made history by producing the first recordings of the complete Beethoven piano sonatas. In 2018, the Library of Congress selected these recordings to be placed in the National Recording Registry for its historical significance.

== Life and work ==
=== Early years ===
Born Aaron Schnabel in Lipnik (Kunzendorf) near Bielsko-Biała, Austro-Hungarian Empire (today a part of Poland), he was the youngest of three children born to Isidor Schnabel, a textile merchant, and his wife, Ernestine Taube (née Labin). He had two sisters, Clara and Frieda. His family was Jewish.

When the boy was two, Schnabel's parents moved the family to Vienna in 1884 for the benefit of young Schnabel whom his mother recalls as showing a natural gift for music. Schnabel began learning the piano at the age of four, when he took a spontaneous interest in his eldest sister Clara's piano lessons. At the age of six, he began piano lessons under Professor Hans Schmitt of the Vienna Conservatorium (today the University of Music and Performing Arts, Vienna). Three years later he began studying under Theodor Leschetizky. The teacher once said to him, "You will never be a pianist; you are a musician." He allowed Schnabel to leave Liszt's Hungarian Rhapsodies and concentrate instead on Schubert's sonatas, which had been widely neglected up to that point.

=== Leschetizky years ===
Schnabel studied under Leschetizky's tutelage for seven years, between 1891 and 1897. Fellow students of Leschetizky during that period included Ossip Gabrilowitsch, Mark Hambourg, and Ignaz Friedman.

Initially, for his first year under Leschetizky, Schnabel was given rigorous preparatory technical tuition from Anna Yesipova (Leschetizky's second wife and a famous pianist in her own right) and also from Malwine Brée, who was Leschetizky's assistant. From age ten, he participated in all of Leschetizky's classes.

Following a failed initial approach to Anton Bruckner, Schnabel studied music theory and composition under Eusebius Mandyczewski. Mandyczewski was an assistant to Johannes Brahms, and through him Schnabel was introduced to Brahms' circle. He often was in the great composer's presence. The young Schnabel once heard Brahms play in a performance of his first piano quartet; for all the missed notes, said Schnabel, it "was in the true grand manner."

Schnabel made his official concert debut in 1897, at the Bösendorfer-Saal in Vienna. Later that same year, he gave a series of concerts in Budapest, Prague and Brno.

=== Berlin years ===
Schnabel moved to Berlin in 1898, making his debut there with a concert at the Bechstein-Saal. Following World War I, Schnabel also toured widely, visiting the United States, Russia and England.

He gained initial fame thanks to orchestral concerts he gave under the conductor Arthur Nikisch as well as playing in chamber music and accompanying his future wife, the contralto Therese Behr, in Lieder.

In chamber music, he founded the Schnabel Trio with the violinist Alfred Wittenberg and the cellist Anton Hekking; they played together between 1902 and 1904. In 1905, he formed a second Schnabel Trio with Carl Flesch (with whom he also played violin sonatas) and the cellist Jean Gérardy. In 1914, with the outbreak of the First World War, Gérardy (a Belgian) left the trio as he could no longer remain in Germany. He was replaced by Hugo Becker and this became the third Schnabel Trio.

Later, Schnabel also played in a quartet with violinist Bronisław Huberman, composer/violist Paul Hindemith and the cellist Gregor Piatigorsky (with whom he also played and recorded cello sonatas). Schnabel also played with a number of other famous musicians including the violinist Joseph Szigeti and the cellists Pablo Casals and Pierre Fournier.

He was friends of, and played with, the most distinguished conductors of the day, including Wilhelm Furtwängler, Bruno Walter, Otto Klemperer, George Szell, Willem Mengelberg, and Adrian Boult.

From 1925 Schnabel taught at the Berlin State Academy, where his masterclasses brought him great renown. For his piano students, See: List of music students by teacher: R to S#Artur Schnabel.

=== Later years ===
External audio
- You may listen to Artur Schnabel performing Wolfgang Amadeus Mozart's Piano Concerto No. 27 in B♭ major, K. 595 with John Barbirolli conducting the London Symphony Orchestra in 1934 here on archive.org

Schnabel, who was Jewish, left Berlin in 1933 after the Nazi Party took control. He lived in England for a time while giving masterclasses at Tremezzo on Lake Como in Italy, before moving to the United States in 1939. In 1944, he became a naturalized citizen of the United States. There he took a teaching post at the University of Michigan. Among his pupils in Michigan was composer Sam Raphling. At the end of World War II he returned to Europe, settling in Switzerland.

His mother Ernestine Taube remained in Vienna after the Anschluss, and at the age of 83, in August 1942, was deported to Theresienstadt concentration camp, where she died two months later. Artur Schnabel never returned to Germany or Austria after the war. He continued to give concerts on both sides of the Atlantic until the end of his life, as well as composing and continuing to make records, although he was never very fond of the whole studio process. He died of uremia in Axenstein, Switzerland, after developing an ailment of the heart, and was buried in Schwyz, Switzerland. Schnabel was awarded the Order of Prince Danilo I.

=== Family ===
In 1899, when Schnabel was 17, his daughter Elizabeth Rostra was born in the Czech city of Brno. The offspring from a youthful love affair, Elizabeth became a pianist and piano pedagogue, was married to a psychoanalyst and died in Switzerland in 1995.

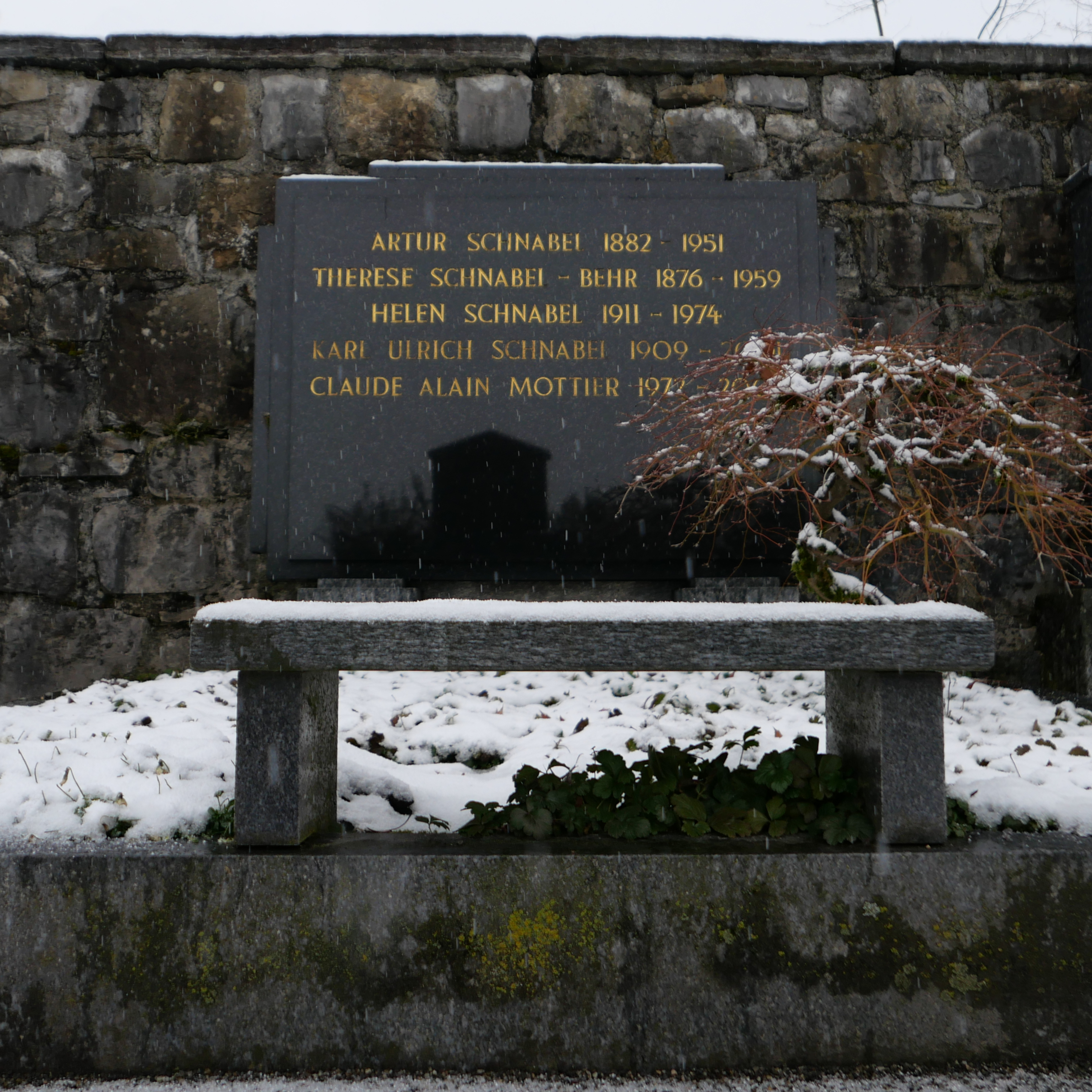
The family-grave in January 2024.

In 1905, Artur Schnabel married the contralto and Lieder singer Therese Behr (1876–1959). They had two sons, Karl Ulrich Schnabel (1909–2001) who also became a classical pianist and renowned piano teacher, and Stefan Schnabel (1912–1999), who became a well regarded actor. The Schnabel family kept a lifelong, close relationship with Artur Schnabel's daughter from his teenage relationship, Elizabeth Rostra.

His wife, son Karl Ulrich and his wife Helen, née Fogel (1911–1974), a pianist from the US, and their grandson Claude Alain Mottier (1972–2002), who was a pianist as well and died as the innocent victim of a traffic accident, were buried in Artur's grave as well. In 2006, the municipality of the town of Schwyz declared the tomb a monument. This exempts the grave site from the regulations that stipulate the removal of the remains after a certain period.

== Repertoire ==
Schnabel was best known for his devotion to the core German composers, especially the Viennese classics of Mozart, Beethoven and Schubert. He was also renowned for his playing of works by Brahms and Schumann, and he played and recorded works by Bach.

However, his repertoire was wider than that. During his young virtuosic years in Berlin, he played works by other composers including Liszt, Chopin and Weber. On his early American tours, he programmed works such as the Chopin Preludes and Schumann's Fantasie in C. Among other works that he played, as recalled by those such as Claudio Arrau and Vladimir Horowitz, who had heard Schnabel in the 1920s, were Chopin's E minor Piano Concerto and the Piano Sonata No. 2 in B♭ minor, and Weber's Konzertstück in F minor, Piano Sonata No. 2, and Invitation to the Dance. Schnabel himself mentioned that he had played the Liszt Sonata in B minor "very often", as well as the Liszt E♭ Piano Concerto.

It is not clear why Schnabel dropped those from his performing repertoire in the 1930s, after his final departure from Germany. He claimed that it was because he decided that he wanted to play only "music which is better than it could be performed". However, it has been suggested by some that "Schnabel, uprooted from his native heritage, may have been clinging to the great German composers in an attempt to keep his cultural origins alive".

Schnabel was known for championing the then-neglected sonatas of Schubert and, even more so, Beethoven, including his more challenging late works. While on a tour of Spain, Schnabel wrote to his wife saying that during a performance of Beethoven's Diabelli Variations he had begun to feel sorry for the audience. "I am the only person here who is enjoying this, and I get the money; they pay and have to suffer," he wrote. Schnabel did much to popularize Beethoven's piano music, making the first complete recordings of the sonatas, completing the set for the British label His Master's Voice in 1935. In March 2018, it was one of 25 recordings that the Library of Congress selected to be placed in the National Recording Registry, for its cultural and historical significance. This set of recordings has never been out of print and is considered by many to be the touchstone of Beethoven sonata interpretations, though shortcomings in finger technique mar many performances of fast movements (Sergei Rachmaninoff is supposed to have referred to him as "the great adagio pianist"). It has been said that he suffered greatly from nerves when recording; in a more private setting, his technique was impeccable. Claudio Arrau has said that Schnabel's live performances during the 1920s were technically "flawless." He also recorded all the Beethoven piano concertos.

== Performance style ==
Schnabel was a pragmatic performer. As an example, Schnabel never played encores, believing they would cheapen the performance. He is quoted saying, "I have always considered applause to be a receipt, not a bill." American composer Milton Babbitt said of Schnabel, "He was the thinking man's pianist, and in spite of that was very popular."

== Compositional style ==
External audio
- You may listen to Artur Schnabel and his son Karl Ulrich Schnabel performing Wolfgang Amadeus Mozart's Concerto for Two Pianos in E♭ major, K. 365 with Adrian Boult conducting the London Symphony Orchestra in 1936 here on archive.org

Despite his performing repertoire being concentrated largely on the works of Beethoven, Schubert, Mozart and Brahms, almost all of his own compositions (none of which are in the active repertoire) are atonal. (It is interesting, in this regard, to note that Schnabel was a close friend of Arnold Schoenberg, his Austrian-American compatriot, who was famous as a pioneering composer of atonal and twelve-tone music.)

They are "difficult" yet fascinating and complex works, and are marked by genuine originality of style. Composers Ernst Krenek and Roger Sessions have commented that they show signs of undoubted genius (see biography of Schnabel by Cesar Saerchinger). Schnabel's list of compositions eventually included three symphonies, a piano concerto, a rhapsody for orchestra, a piano sonata (premiered by Eduard Erdmann at the 1925 Venice ISCM Festival) and five string quartets, amongst various smaller works.

In recent years, a number of his compositions (notably championed by the violinist Paul Zukofsky) have been recorded and made available on CD, including three of his string quartets, the three symphonies, a rhapsody for orchestra, and four solo piano works: his Sonata, Dance Suite, Piece in Seven Movements (1935–37) and Seven Pieces (1947). Pianist Jenny Lin released a recording of Schnabel's complete keyboard music for the Steinway and Sons label in 2019.

== Compositions ==
Artur Schnabel compositions are published by Peermusic Classical and distributed by Hal Leonard Artur Schnabel scores.

=== Chamber works ===
- 3 Fantasiestücke (3 Fantasy Pieces) for violin, viola and piano (1898)
- Piano Quintet (1914)
- Sonata for Solo Violin (1918)
- String Trio (1929)
- Sonata for Solo Cello (1931)
- Sonata for Violin and Piano (1935)
- String Quartet No. 1 (1915/16)
- String Quartet No. 2 (1921)
- String Quartet No. 3 (1922)
- String Quartet No. 4 (1930)
- String Quartet No. 5 (1940)
- Duodecimet, chamber orchestra (1950, René Leibowitz completed composition after Artur Schnabel's death)

=== Orchestral works ===
- Piano Concerto in d-minor (Intermezzo & Rondo) (1901)
- Rhapsody for Orchestra (1946)
- Symphony No. 1 (1938/39)
- Symphony No. 2 (1941/43)
- Symphony No. 3 (1948/49)

=== Choral works ===
- Dance and Secret
- Joy and Peace

=== Songs ===
- Ten Early Songs, Op. 11 (1901) (Frühe Lieder), medium voice and piano
- Seven Early Songs, Op. 14 (1899-1902) (Frühe Lieder), medium voice and piano
- Notturno, Op. 16 (prob. 1910), medium voice

=== Solo piano ===
From: Chronological List of Compositions by Artur Schnabel

- Three Piano Pieces (1898)
- "Three Fantasy Pieces (1898)"
- Dance Suite (1919)
- Sonata for Piano (1923)
- Piece in Seven Movements (1936-1937)
- Seven Piano Pieces (1947)

== Writings ==
- My Life and Music. Mineola, NY: Dover Publications. Reprinted 1988. ISBN 0-486-25571-9. Transcripts of the twelve lectures held by Schnabel at the University of Chicago in 1945.
- Music, Wit, and Wisdom. Ed. Werner Grünzweig and Lynn Matheson. Hofheim: Wolke, 2009. ISBN 978-3-936000-53-5. New edition of My Life and Music, revised according to the sources held at the Music Archive of the Akademie der Künste, Berlin.
- Music and the Line of Most Resistance. Rev. and ed. edition. Ed. Lynn Matheson and Ann Schnabel Mottier. Hofheim: Wolke, 2007. ISBN 978-3-936000-51-1. First published Princeton University Press, 1942. Transcripts of lectures that Schnabel gave at Harvard University and at the University of Chicago.

== 2016 revival and 2018 documentary film ==
On September 11, 2016, a major international revival of Schnabel's compositions began with a concert at the Großer Sendesaal des rbb im Haus des Rundfunks, presented as part of the Musikfest Berlin. The program featured pianist Markus Pawlik (who also curated), the Szymanowski String Quartet, baritone Dietrich Henschel, and film projections by Matthew Mishory. German actor Udo Samel read a selection of Artur Schnabel's letters to Mary Virginia Foreman. The program was repeated Wednesday, 14 September 2016, at the RadioKulturhaus in Vienna and again on Thursday, 30 August 2018, at the Salle des congrès in Megève, France, with further performances planned. The 2016 Berlin concert was broadcast in its entirety on Rundfunk Berlin-Brandenburg radio and filmed for the Arte documentary Artur Schnabel: No Place of Exile, directed by Matthew Mishory. The film premiered on Arte on 4 February 2018. The film was shot in Switzerland, Italy, Vienna, and Berlin, utilizing unexpected textures (super8, drone footage, back-projection) and the actor Udo Samel to chart Schnabel's course through the emotional and physical landscapes of the European 20th century. It also features the performances from the 2016 Haus des Rundfunks concert.

In May 2019, Steinway & Sons label released the first complete piano works with pianist Jenny Lin. In November 2019, an LA premiere of the film was held at the Villa Aurora in Pacific Palisades. The Villa had served as an important venue for German-Jewish intellectuals and artists during and after WWII.

== See also ==
- Artur Schnabel Piano Competition
