= César Saerchinger =

Pioneering radio broadcaster, author, and musicologist

César Saerchinger (October 23, 1884 – October 10, 1971) was a French-born American broadcaster, musicologist, and writer. The New York Times referred to him as a "a pioneer in transatlantic radio broadcasting". His books included The Way Out of War (1940) and a biography of the pianist Artur Schnabel (1958).
