= Heinrich Kaspar Schmid =

German composer (1874–1953)

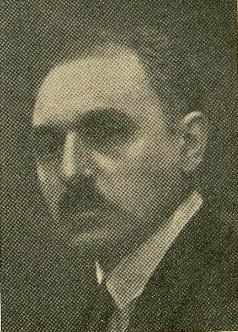
Heinrich Kaspar Schmid (1924)

Heinrich Kaspar Schmid (11 September 1874 – 8 January 1953) was a German composer.

== Biography ==
Schmid was born at Landau an der Isar.

As a boy he studied music with his father who was a school teacher and choral conductor. He also sang in the boys choir at Regensburg Cathedral for several years. He entered the Munich Akademie der Tonkunst where he studied composition with Ludwig Thuille. In 1905 he was appointed to teach at the Munich Academy and in 1919 was promoted to a full professor. After World War I, Schmid entered a highly successful part of his career both as a performer and composer. He toured throughout Austria, Scandinavia, and Russia. In 1921 he became director of the Karlsruhe Conservatory and assumed the directorship of the Augsburg Music School [now Conservatory] in 1924. He retired from academic work in 1932.

He died at Geiselbullach, near Munich, in 1953.

== Work ==
Stylistically, Schmid's compositions were more in keeping with the late-Romantics than with 20th-century innovations. Brahms in particular had a major influence on Schmid's compositional sensibility. This is particularly evident in the sonatas for violin and piano (1920, 1939). His best work is probably his Symphony in D Minor (1947) which was admired for its fresh and accomplished treatment of traditional musical materials. Elements of Bavarian folk music appear in the rural mass settings, choral compositions, lieder, chamber works, and his opera Finden und Meiden.

== Sources ==
- Andrew D. McCredie. The New Grove Dictionary of Opera, edited by Stanley Sadie (1992), ISBN 0-333-73432-7 and ISBN 1-56159-228-5
