= Fantasie in C (Schumann) =

Piano piece by Robert Schumann

Fantasie
- by Robert Schumann
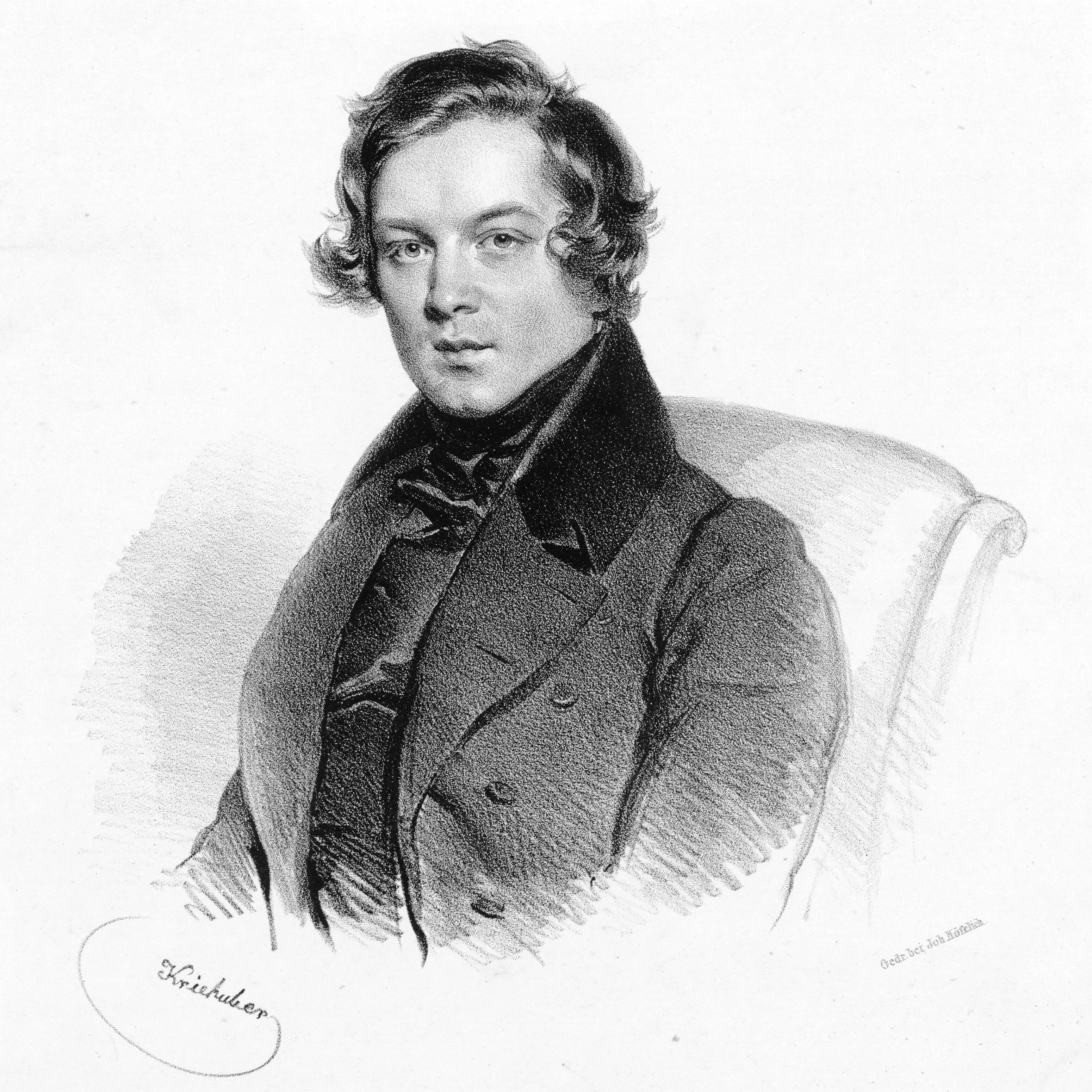
- Schumann in 1839
- Key: C major
- Opus: 17
- Composed: 1836
- Dedication: Franz Liszt
- Published: 1839
- Duration: 30 minutes
- Movements: 3
- Scoring: Solo piano

The Fantasie in C, Op. 17, was written by Robert Schumann in 1836. It was revised prior to publication in 1839, when it was dedicated to Franz Liszt. It is generally described as one of Schumann's greatest works for solo piano, and is one of the central works of the early Romantic period. It is often called by the Italian version, fantasia; the word "Fantasie" is the German spelling.

== Structure ==
I. Durchaus fantastisch und leidenschaftlich vorzutragen; Im Legenden-Ton

II. Mäßig. Durchaus energisch

III. Langsam getragen. Durchweg leise zu halten

The Fantasie is in loose sonata form. Its three movements are headed:

1. Durchaus fantastisch und leidenschaftlich vorzutragen; Im Legenden-Ton - Quite fantastic and passionately delivered; In the tone of a legend.
2. Mäßig. Durchaus energisch - Moderate. Quite energetic. (in E^{♭} major)
3. Langsam getragen. Durchweg leise zu halten. - Taken slowly. Keep quiet throughout.

The first movement is rhapsodic and passionate; the middle movement is a grandiose rondo based on a majestic march, with episodes that recall the emotion of the first movement; and the finale is slow and meditative.

== Genesis ==
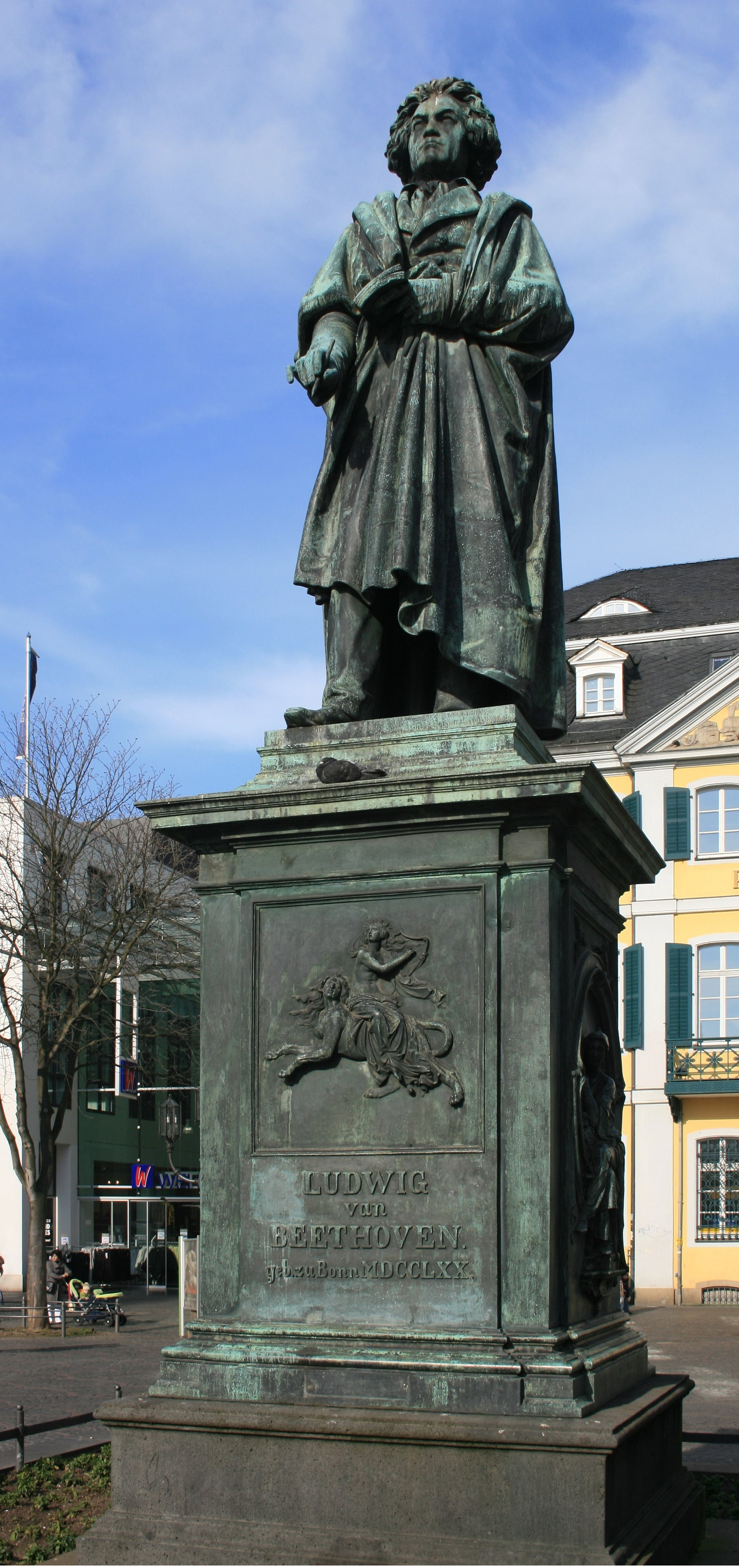
Beethoven Monument

The piece has its origin in early 1836, when Schumann composed a piece entitled Ruines expressing his distress at being parted from his beloved Clara Wieck (later to become his wife). This later became the first movement of the Fantasy. Later that year, he wrote two more movements to create a work intended as a contribution to the appeal for funds to erect a monument to Beethoven in his birthplace, Bonn. Schumann offered the work to the publisher Kistner, suggesting that 100 presentation copies could be sold to raise money for the monument. Other contributions to the Beethoven monument fund included Mendelssohn's Variations sérieuses.

The original title of Schumann's work was "Obolen auf Beethovens Monument: Ruinen, Trophaen, Palmen, Grosse Sonate f.d. Piano f. Für Beethovens Denkmal". Kistner refused, and Schumann tried offering the piece to Haslinger in January 1837. When Haslinger also refused, he offered it to Breitkopf & Härtel in May 1837. The movements' subtitles (Ruins, Trophies, Palms) became Ruins, Triumphal Arch, and Constellation, and were then removed altogether before Breitkopf & Härtel eventually issued the Fantasie in May 1839.

The work was dedicated to Franz Liszt, who replied in a letter dated June 5, 1839: "The Fantaisie dedicated to me is a work of the highest kind – and I am really proud of the honour you have done me in dedicating to me so grand a composition. I mean, therefore, to work at it and penetrate it through and through, so as to make the utmost possible effect with it."

The Beethoven Monument was eventually completed, due mainly to the efforts of Liszt, who paid 2,666 thaler, the largest single contribution. It was unveiled in grand style in 1845, the attendees including Queen Victoria and Prince Albert, and many other dignitaries and composers, but not Schumann, who was ill.

== Allusion and quotation ==
Schumann prefaced the work with a quote from Friedrich Schlegel:

Durch alle Töne tönet
Im bunten Erdentraum
Ein leiser Ton gezogen
Für den, der heimlich lauschet.

("Resounding through all the notes

In the earth's colorful dream

There sounds a faint long-drawn note

For the one who listens in secret.")

The musical quotation of a phrase from Beethoven's song cycle An die ferne Geliebte in the coda of the first movement was not acknowledged by Schumann, and apparently was not spotted until 1910. The text of the passage quoted is: Accept then these songs [beloved, which I sang for you alone]. Both the Schlegel stanza and the Beethoven quotation are appropriate to Schumann's current situation of separation from Clara Wieck. Schumann wrote to Clara: The first movement may well be the most passionate I have ever composed – a deep lament for you. They still had many tribulations to suffer before they finally married four years later.

== Reception and performance ==
Liszt was one of the few pianists capable of meeting the then-unparalleled demands of the Fantasie, particularly the second movement coda's rapid skips in opposite directions simultaneously. He had played the piece to Schumann privately, and later incorporated it into his teaching repertory, but he considered it unsuitable for public performance and never played it in public. However, Liszt returned the honour by dedicating his own Piano Sonata in B minor to Schumann in 1853. Clara Schumann did not start to perform the Fantasie in her concerts until 1866, ten years after the composer died.

The Fantasie has been recorded and played in public many times by great pianists such as Géza Anda, Leif Ove Andsnes, Martha Argerich, Idil Biret, Claudio Arrau, Vladimir Ashkenazy, Jorge Bolet, Clifford Curzon, Annie Fischer, Nelson Freire, Vladimir Horowitz, Wilhelm Kempff, Alicia de Larrocha, Murray Perahia, Maurizio Pollini, Sviatoslav Richter, Mitsuko Uchida, Mikhail Voskresensky, Marc-André Hamelin and Cyprien Katsaris.

== Sources ==
- Leslie Gerber
- Naxos Direct
- Oxford Journals
- Sputnik Music
- ABC Classics
