= Burkard Schliessmann =

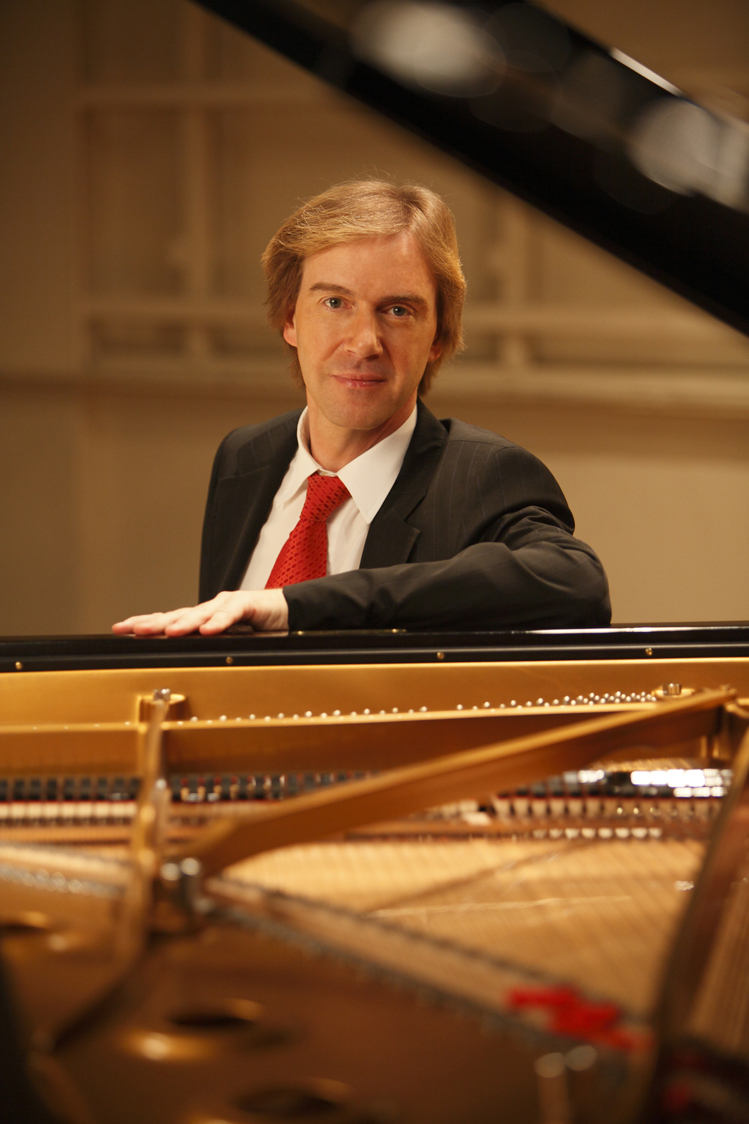
- Burkard Schliessmann in Berlin at the presentation of his Chopin-Schumann Anniversary Edition 2010
- Born: Aschaffenburg, Germany
- Education: Frankfurt University of Music and Performing Arts
- Occupations: Classical pianist; Organist
- Musical career
- Years active: 1984–present
- Labels: Centaur Records; Arthaus Musik; Divine Art; Naxos Records; Bayer Music Group; MSR Classics USA
- Website: schliessmann.com

Burkard Schliessmann is a German classical pianist and concert artist with an active international career.

== Life and career ==
Schliessmann was born in Aschaffenburg. He attended the Frankfurt University of Music and Performing Arts and graduated with a Master's degree. He studied under several internationally recognized musical artists and participated in master classes conducted by Shura Cherkassky and Bruno Leonardo Gelber.

Schliessmann performed at Steinway Hall in New York and is an official artist of Steinway & Sons. He has performed as a recitalist, chamber musician and orchestral soloist throughout the world and has participated in music festivals in Europe, among these the Münchner Klaviersommer, the festival "Frankfurt Feste", the Valldemossa Chopin Festival and the Maurice Ravel Festival in Paris. He received invitations from orchestras like the Munich Philharmonic Orchestra, hr-Sinfonieorchester, WDR Radio Symphony Orchestra Cologne, Symphony Orchestra Wuppertal and the New Philharmonic Westfalia, in addition to other orchestras.

He has received honors and awards for his performances and his musical recordings and has been the subject and guest artist on many radio and television programs. His repertoire comprises Bach, Beethoven, Mozart, Schumann, Chopin, Liszt, Brahms, Scriabin, the Second Viennese School up to the Avantgarde.

=== Pedagogy ===
Besides performing, Schliessmann is an active music pedagogue, and joins as Professor of Piano the faculty of LOML International Piano Summer Academy, London Overseas Musicians' League, in London, United Kingdom. His pedagogical concept is a unit of psyche and physis of each student and his individuality, taking this by a fusion of the art, music and the instrument. His students are coming from the United States, Europe, Russia, Croatia, Poland, China, Japan and New Zealand. Most of them are prize-winners of international piano competitions and are teaching themselves in universities or conservatories.

The LOML is official member of Alink-Argerich Foundation since October 2023.

== Personal life ==
Schliessmann is also a professional scuba diver and serves as an Ambassador for the "Protecting of Our Ocean Planet" program of the Project AWARE Foundation. The inspiration of the variety of colours of the underwater world he converts into differentiated sounds in his artistic interpretations, a phenomenon called synesthesia. In several segments of an interview with Oliver Fraenzke in The New Listener entitled "Interview: Burkard Schliessmann", Schliessmann describes his experiences of these feelings and impressions.

He also is engaged in the study of philosophy and photography.

== Musical style, interpretation and artistry ==
"Schliessmanns' approach to the piano, though guided by a piercing intellect, remains essentially intuitive", so a reviewer in the introduction to an interview in High Performance Review HPR, USA.

Schliessmann himself stated in a conversation about the Goldberg Variations with James Reel in 2008,

Intuition is a level of the highest range. In details, I don't have to think or to worry about the realization of my interpretation; no, it's something that spreads out of my artistic all-compassion. [...] This is my deepest artistic conviction for the rightness of an interpretation – interpretation as a summary of something unique and whole, not of a combining of details. Intuition is a level that includes all levels of emotion, intelligence, structure, and architecture. And I'm also confronted with the question of poetry and poesy, something that is so often neglected – especially in Bach.

— Burkard Schliessmann, Fanfare

According to Phil Muse, "Schliessmann is essentially a romantic, and as such he is the last sort of pianist you would expect to just play the notes as written, without comment."

James Harrington argued in American Record Guide in 2010 that "Schliessmann arrives at his own unique interpretations, with reverence for the past (Cortot, Michelangeli, Rubinstein, and Horszowski especially). While each phrase is impeccably shaped, there is an overall thrust to each work that holds everything together. He uses rubato sparingly, and while he embraces the virtuosity in the music, it never overrides other musical content. After a half century of listening to a number of these works, I must say that Schliessmann shed new light on most of them."

Peter J. Rabinowitz described in Fanfare in 2011 Schliessmann "as a fiercely intellectual pianist." He added:

He's intellectual in two senses. First, he approaches this music with a tremendous store of background knowledge – knowledge about the composers and their works, about their early receptions, about their critical writings, about their literary inspirations, and about the cultural milieu in which they found themselves. Second, he performs the music with a rigorous sense of the ways its details contribute to its form, both in terms of its overall architecture and in terms of its vertical structure. Not that he sounds anything like Pollini, much less Rosen (to mention just two other pianists often tagged as intellectuals); his playing is far lusher and less severe than Pollini's (listen to the gorgeous shifts in color in the Barcarolle), far more flexible than Rosen's. Still, if you're looking for playing with splashy virtuosity, heightened emotionality, and an extroverted interpretive style, you won't find it here.

=== On playing Bach, Schumann and Chopin ===
In 2008, Schliessmann said that he played Bach more than any other composer and that he had played the complete organ works at the age of 21 – and this by memory.

As a child and youngster I had been taught by one of the last master-students of the legendary Helmut Walcha, and I completely had been affected by this style of insight into Bach and the internal structures. This method of regarding the independent coherence of all the voices gave me a special comprehension of Bach and his philosophy. Lastly one can say that I have been growing up with Bach, even to this day.

— Burkard Schliessmann, Fanfare

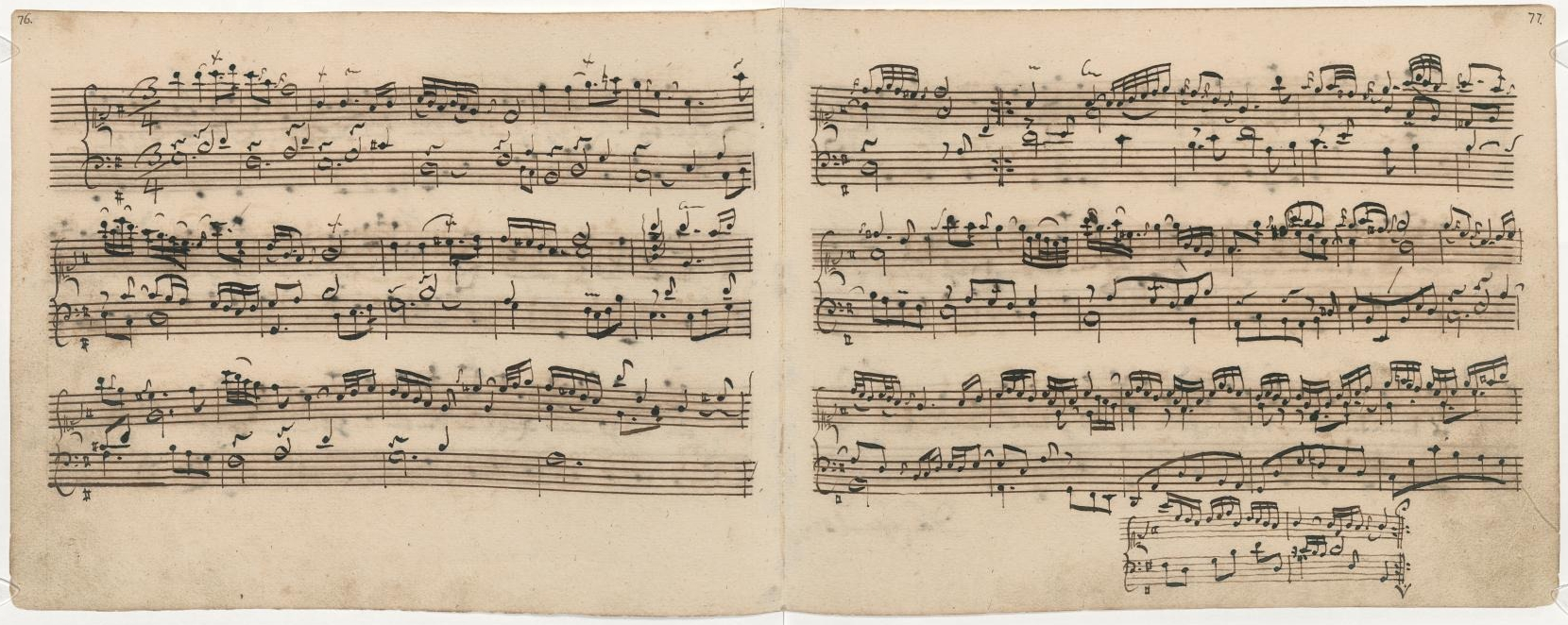
Goldberg Variations, BWV 988, Aria Autograph

The Goldberg Variations have always enjoyed a special status, with pianists regarding them as a touchstone of their technical and interpretative powers. At stake are the ability to light up the work from within, a tightrope walk that at the same time describes a vast circle, starting out and returning to a state of apotheotic stillness, the ability to find one's bearings within a particular concentration of inner and outer complexity, an inner and outer coherence and homogeneity that are all-embracing, the ability, finally, to produce an explosion of inner cells by reduced means and, hence, a particular sensitivity, sinewy tension, and color. The performer must play a game with particular devices, finding solutions to the problems posed by the work not in octave doublings and other playful expedients but in a tightly structured inner rigor and order. What is demanded is a particular form of internalization, of inner and outer lyricism. It is this that makes the Goldberg Variations so unique – and so demanding.

In a segment of an interview with James Reel in Fanfare entitled "Burkard Schliessmann Articulates His Approach to Bach", Schliessmann speaks about the surreal and metaphysical experience of playing the Bach Goldberg Variations. According to Schliessmann, "Bach really cannot be seen, understood, and interpreted from an isolated point. Bach has to be explored as part of something complete, unique, of a universe – an aspect of human realism." This Schliessmann also stated in broadcastings on SWR, WDR and HR.

According to Schliessmann, "Chopin is the crowning and climax of piano-playing. It's something so unique, all-affecting in emotionalism, musical architecture, and structure, that all past giants are present in it: Bach and Mozart. Chopin's elegance is so singular, that again you need much experience to convey his music in the real and original style. The question of rubato is very sensitive: It's nothing arbitrary, but much more something well calculated and well proportioned, something that is integrated in the classical strength of form, which is constructed on the profound knowledge of the polyphonic and contrapuntal structures of Bach and Mozart."

In another interview with Peter J. Rabinowitz in Fanfare entitled "Cannons Camouflaged by Flowers: Burkard Schliessmann Talks about Chopin", Schliessmann stated, "To approach Chopin, you have to separate him stylistically completely from Schumann. Schumann admired Chopin very much and saw him as friend, but Chopin himself had much less interest in and esteem for Schumann. Whereas the young Schumann's creative path led in the opposite direction, from classical forms – however deeply revered, to the freedom of subjective self-expression – this is an absolute deep contrast to Chopin, who found himself favoring a classical form of musical essence. He needs to bring nothing in from outside, the music is nearly absolute."

=== Instruments ===
In a segment of an interview in Fanfare entitled "A Philosophy, Not a Profession: The Art of Burkard Schliessmann", Peter J. Rabinowitz wrote that Schliessmann is a connoisseur of the mechanics of the piano and he insists that his concert instruments be in perfect condition. He described that according to Schliessmann the quality of the sound has its source, as well, in the quality of his piano technician, Georges Ammann.

"I don't want to be conceited," Schliessmann said, "absolutely not, but it's a fact that piano and player have to blend into one."

Peter J. Rabinowitz added that for Schliessmann "the interaction between piano and concert hall is also extremely important. He often travels with his own favored instruments (especially if there is a recording or broadcast involved), and he carefully adjusts to any hall in which he plays."

Schliessmann stated: "I need a day to hear the hall and to place the piano at the right position. This maximizes the impact on the audience."

James Inverne wrote in Steinway International Pianos Magazine that "Schliessmann owns two treasured Steinways. They were carefully selected after years of searching." One, Schliessmann said, is a "very orchestral" instrument and is used for large scale works. The other "is very sensitive and sensible, great for chamber music." He added: "The search for the ideal instruments was entirely worth it: My pianos are alive to me and a mirror of me. It was vital to get it right."

=== About live concerts and studio recordings ===
Chopin's biography remains obscure. He withheld himself all his life, in diametrical contrast to the openness and accessibility of his contemporary Franz Liszt. Chopin always conveyed the impression of a suffering soul, not to say a martyr, almost as if this were to nourish or even underpin his inspiration. Striving for crystalline perfection, he never ventured outside his own domain. You know, the Danish philosopher Søren Kierkegaard is said to have given, as a child, "martyr" as his chosen career. Chopin must have shared this cult of the Pater dolorosus.

According to Peter J. Rabinowitz, the artistic fulfilment of Schliessmann's performances is the communication with his audience. Phil Muse commented: "There is a strong personality behind his performances, one that always has a decided opinion about the music" and the FAZ described his concert appearances as a "mystic fusion".

It's quite an obsession to me to communicate at this moment, at this time, with my audience. I don't only play for them, it's something I want to give back to them. I feel how each listener in the audience is listening to me, and I feel its warmness, for example, and I give it back to the complete audience. I feel the intensity of hearing, of listening. This is like electricity, and this I give back to the audience. It's very stimulating.

— Burkard Schliessmann, Fanfare

Peter J. Rabinowitz explained, "this give and take is so important that, when recording in a studio, he likes to bring a few friends along to serve as an audience."

Schliessmann himself said: "Sometimes, I ask one, two, or more people just to sit in the audience and to listen to me with concentration as I play. It's stimulating for me, and I try to build up a situation like that in a recital with a live audience. This helps me to play in a way that electrifies people."

The interview in Fanfare entitled "Cannons Camouflaged by Flowers: Burkard Schliessmann Talks about Chopin" concluded with a statement of Schliessmann:

The things that are most important to me [...] are perfectionism and truth. Truth of interpretation, truth of sound, truth of the instrument, truth of the hall, truth lastly of all. This means Artistic Integrity to me. Coming back to my artistic aims in my Chopin: It's a special combination of lyricism, poetry, virtuosity, noblesse, classical strength but also romantic enthusiasm and passion, in bringing out this obscure man Chopin ...

— Burkard Schliessmann, Fanfare

=== Definition of success and talent ===
Related to this, one could ask ″what is talent?″, to which I would immediately answer: ″To have the strength, power, endurance, courage and stamina to start new after each setback.″ These characters blend into one: Virtue.

In a segment of an interview in The Cross-Eyed Pianist entitled ″Meet the Artist – Burkard Schliessmann, pianist″ Schliessmann answered the question: As a musician, what is your definition of success?

True success is connected and bounded to the truth of interpretation. There begins and starts a long lasting experience: the chance that the artistry of a true artist will live on for generations, and will influence other epochs. This is the meaning of artistic integrity – and the definition of success.

— Burkard Schliessmann, The Cross-Eyed Pianist

== Honours and awards ==
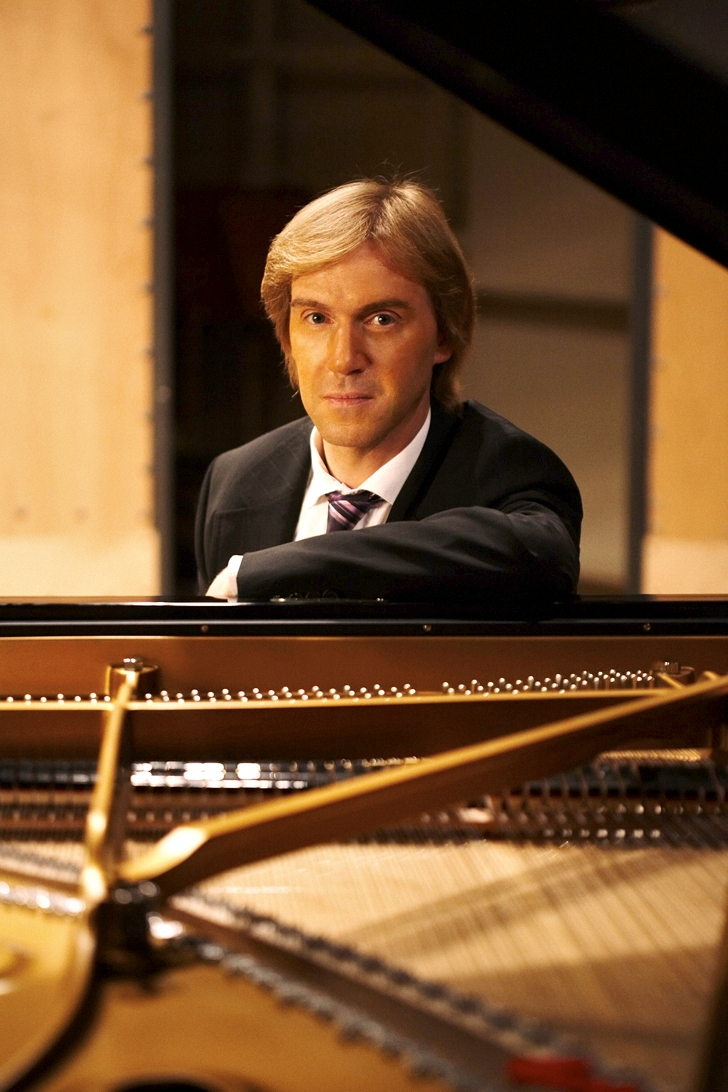
Burkard Schliessmann in Teldex Studio, Berlin

- 2024: KUCI Classical Impacts: ′Album of the Month′ in Classical Impacts with Isabella Cao. May 2024. Robert Schumann—Fantasies: Kreisleriana, Op. 16, Fantasie in C major, Op. 17, Arabeske, Op. 18, Fantasiestücke, Op. 12, Nachtstücke, Op. 23, Fantasiestücke Op. 111, Gesänge der Frühe, Op. 133)
- 2024: Radio România Muzical: ′Album of the Year 2024′ in CDs of the Year 2024. March 20th, 2024. LIVE & ENCORES. Bach, Chopin, Mendelssohn, Schumann. Released on Divine Art in November 2023, ddc 25755
- 2024: RTÉ lyric fm: ′Lorcan's Pick of the Week′ in Lorcan Murray's Classic Drive, 12–19 February. LIVE & ENCORES. Bach, Chopin, Mendelssohn, Schumann. Released on Divine Art in November 2023, ddc 25755
- 2022: BBC Radio Scotland: ′Album of the Week′ in Classics Unwrapped, 17–24 July. Bach: Goldberg Variations, BWV 988; released on Divine Art in July 2022, ddc 25754. Presented by Jamie MacDougall
- 2019/20: Goethe Plaque of the City of Frankfurt
- 2019: International Acoustic Music Awards IAMA, USA: »Top-Finalist« Instrumental, Chopin: Scherzo No. 1 in B minor, Op. 20
- 2018: Global Music Awards 2018, Gold Medal Winner, 2 Gold Medals Awards of Excellence, Schumann: Kreisleriana – Symphonic Etudes (incl. Variations Posthumes); categories: classical, Instrumental Performance – Album – Germany
- 2018: Global Music Awards 2018, 3 Silver Medals for Outstanding Achievement: Bach: Keyboard Works; categories: classical, instrumental solo and album
- 2017: Global Music Awards 2017, 3 Silver Medals for Outstanding Achievement: Chronological Chopin – Burkard Schliessmann; categories: classical, instrumental/instrumentalist and album
- 2010: Critics' Choice, American Record Guide (Chopin-Schumann Anniversary Edition 2010; released on MSR-Classics in 2010, MS 1361)
- 2008: Critics' Choice, American Record Guide (Bach: Goldberg Variations, BWV 988; released on Bayer in 2007, BR CD 100 326)
- 2008: Recording of the Year, MusicWeb International (Bach: Goldberg Variations, BWV 988; released on Bayer in 2007, BR CD 100 326)
- 2004: Recording of the Year, MusicWeb International (Burkard Schliessmann: Chopin; released on Bayer in 2003, BR CD 100 348)
- Melvin Jones Fellowship Award, in recognition of his international achievements in the Arts and Culture, USA, April 2013
- President's Citation, Bastyr-University, Seattle, Washington, February 2012
- Medal of Merit in Gold, from his hometown in Bavaria, Germany, January 2012
- Lions Clubs International Appreciation Award, USA, June 2010

== Discography (selected) ==
Schliessmann records for Arthaus Musik, MSR-Classics and Bayer. In June 2014 Schliessmann signed a further recording contract with the British label Divine Art for the worldwide releasing of selected piano works and cycles from Johann Sebastian Bach and Frédéric Chopin.

=== Studio albums ===
- Robert Schumann — Fantasies (Disc 1: Kreisleriana, Op. 16, Fantasie in C major, Op. 17, Arabeske, Op. 18; Disc 2: Fantasiestücke, Op. 12, Arabeske, Op. 18 (2nd version), Des Abends (from: Fantasiestücke Op. 12, 2nd version); Disc 3: Nachtstücke, Op. 23, Fantasiestücke Op. 111, Gesänge der Frühe, Op. 133); Divine Art, ddc 25753 (3 SACD; also available on Dolby Atmos)
- Joh. Seb. Bach: Goldberg Variations, BWV 988; Divine Art, ddc 25754 (2 SACD; also available on Dolby Atmos)
- Busoni, Schumann, Liszt, Scriabin, Berg: At the Heart of the Piano (Disc 1: Bach/Busoni — Chaconne in D minor, Schumann — Symphonic Etudes, Op. 13; Disc 2: Schumann — Fantasie in C major, Op. 17, Liszt — Piano Sonata in B minor; Disc 3: Scriabin — Sonata in F sharp minor, Op. 23, Études and Preludes Opp. 2 – 74, Berg — Piano Sonata, Op. 1); Divine Art, dda 21373 (3 CD)
- Frédéric Chopin: Chronological Chopin — Ballades – Preludes – Scherzi and other works (Disc A: Scherzo No. 1 in B minor, Op. 20, Ballade No. 1 in G minor, Op. 23, 24 Préludes, Op. 28; Disc B: Scherzo No. 2 in B-flat minor, Op. 31, Ballade No. 2 in F major, Op. 38, Scherzo No. 3 in C-sharp minor, Op. 39, Prélude in C-sharp minor, Op. 45, Ballade No. 3 in A-flat major, Op. 47, Fantaisie in F minor, Op. 49; Disc C: Ballade No. 4 in F minor, Op. 52, Scherzo No. 4 in E major, Op. 54, Berceuse in D-flat major, Op. 57, Barcarolle in F-sharp major, Op. 60, Polonaise-Fantaisie in A-flat major, Op. 61); Divine Art, ddc 25752 (3 SACD)
- Joh. Seb. Bach: Keyboard Works (Partita No. 2 in C minor, BWV 826, Italian Concerto, BWV 971, Fantasia and Fugue in A minor, BWV 904, Fantasia, Adagio (BWV 968) and Fugue in C minor, BWV 906, Chromatic Fantasia and Fugue in D minor, BWV 903); Divine Art, ddc 25751 (SACD)
- Chopin – Schumann Anniversary Edition 2010, MSR-Classics, MS 1361 (2 SACD)
- Bach: Goldberg Variations, BWV 988; Bayer BR 100 326 (2 SACD)
- Burkard Schliessmann: Chopin (4 Ballades Opp. 23, 38, 47, 52, Fantaisie Op. 49, Barcarolle Op. 60, Polonaise-Fantaisie Op. 61); Bayer BR 100 348 (SACD)
- Schumann: Kreisleriana Op. 16, Symphonic Etudes Op. 13 (incl. Variations posthumes); Bayer BR 100 311
- Schumann – Liszt: Fantasie in C major Op. 17, Sonata in B minor; Bayer BR 100 293
- Scriabin: Piano Works, Opp. 2 – 74; Bayer BR 100 161

=== Live Recordings ===
- LIVE & ENCORES — Disc 1: Joh. Seb. Bach: Partita No. 2 in C minor, BWV 826, Italian Concerto, BWV 971, Chromatic Fantasia and Fugue in D minor, BWV 903); Felix Mendelssohn Bartholdy: Variations sérieuses, Op. 54. Disc 2: Robert Schumann: Fantasie in C major, Op. 17, Frédéric Chopin: Waltz in C-sharp minor, Op. 64, No. 2 (Chopin). Two Encores: Robert Schumann: Chopin (from: Carnaval Op. 9), Warum ? (from: Fantasiestücke, Op. 12). Recorded live in the Concert Hall of FAZIOLI, April 3–5, 2023. Divine Art, ddc 25755 (2 SACD; also available on Dolby Atmos)

=== Vinyl ===
- Robert Schumann — Fantasies: Kreisleriana, Op. 16, Fantasie in C major, Op. 17, Fantasiestücke, Op. 12, Nachtstücke, Op. 23, Fantasiestücke Op. 111, Gesänge der Frühe, Op. 133); Divine Art, ddl 12404 (3 Vinyls)
- Chopin: piano works — Ballades – Preludes – Scherzi and other works (Vinyl A – Side 1: Ballade No. 1 in G minor, Op. 23, Fantaisie in F minor, Op. 49; Side 2: Scherzo No. 2 in B-flat minor, Op. 31, Scherzo No. 4 in E major, Op. 54; Vinyl B – Side 1: Ballade No. 3 in A-flat major, Op. 47, Prélude in C-sharp minor, Op. 45, Ballade No. 4 in F minor, Op. 52; Side 2: Barcarolle in F-sharp major, Op. 60, Polonaise-Fantaisie in A-flat major, Op. 61), Divine Art, ddl 12401 (2 LP)

=== DVDs ===
- Liszt: Piano Transcriptions of Schubert Songs and Godowsky Symphonic Metamorphoses on Waltzes and Themes of Johann Strauss, Arthaus 100 455
- Arthaus DVD Sampler III (Featuring artists including Roberto Alagna, Angela Gheorghiu, Cecilia Bartoli, Bryn Terfel, Claudio Abbado, Montserrat Caballé, Burkard Schliessmann, Philip Langridge, Vesselina Kasarova, Willard White), Arthaus DVD 100 773

== Television and radio productions ==
Schliessmann has appeared in a number of television and radio productions on the European television stations ARD, ZDF, WDR, Bayerischer Rundfunk, Hessischer Rundfunk, ARTE, 3-SAT, EinsFestival, Unitel-Classica, Classical TV and the US channels Classic Arts Showcase, WSMC, WWFM, WUOT, WDPR, KING-FM, KZSU, WQED-FM, WGTE, KGPR, the UK-channel Harmonious World and Canadian channels such as Winnipegs's Classic 107. These include:

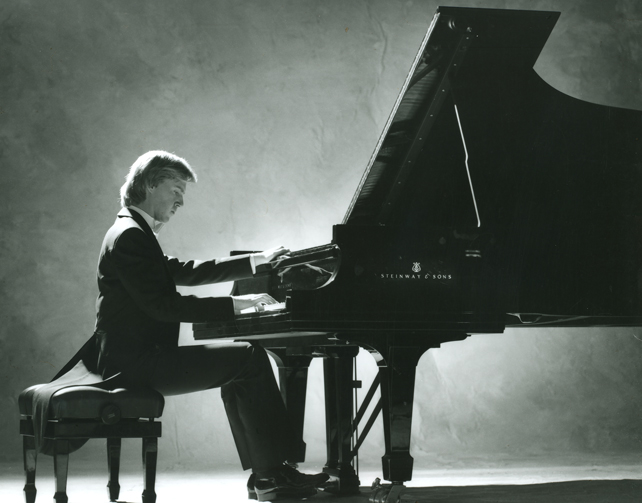
Burkard Schliessmann at the Steinway Grand

- KUCI: A December 14 2025 Interview with Burkard Schliessmann on KUCI’s Classical Impacts with Isabella Cao. March 23, 2026
- KGPR: KGPR Great Falls Public Radio - Montana Public Radio. Classical Journey Interview with Burkard Schliessmann. Matt Donnelly interviews pianist Burkard Schliessmann and a preview of his latest album Fantasies featuring music by Robert Schumann. 15 November 2025
- WQED-FM: Burkard Schliessmann in Voice of the Arts: German born pianist Burkard Schliessmann has concertized around the world. He spoke with Jim Cunningham about the solo piano works of Robert Schumann, Fantasies for the Divine Art label. 28 October 2025
- KZSU: Burkard Schliessmann at Stanford University, USA: The Music Treasury celebrates Burkard Schliessmann. Presented by Gary Lemco and Lorrin M. Koran. 14 July 2024, 7–9 pm. Works from Joh. Seb. Bach, Robert Schumann, Felix Mendelssohn Bartholdy and Frédéric Chopin.
- WINNIPEG'S CLASSIC 107, Arts & Culture, Canada: Encore Encore!! – Pianist Burkard Schliessmann releases fabulous new recording. With Chris Wolf; 15 April 2024
- KUCI: An Interview with Burkard Schliessmann on KUCI’s Classical Impacts with Isabella Cao. April 10, 2024
- WWFM: Cadenza with David Osenberg, USA: Burkard Schliessmann, piano. In conversation with David Osenberg. Works from Joh. Seb. Bach, Robert Schumann, Felix Mendelssohn Bartholdy, Frédéric Chopin. March 15, 2024.
- Harmonious World: A conversation with classical pianist Burkard Schliessmann. Episode 196. By Hilary Seabrook. February 18, 2024
- WGTE: Pianist Burkard Schliessmann speaks with Mary Claire Murphy about his live recording of works by Bach, Mendelssohn, Chopin, and Schumann. His "Live and Encores" album captures all the sensitivity and expressivity of a beautiful Fazioli piano and exhibits Schliessmann's stylistic versatility. February 7, 2024
- KZSU: Burkard Schliessmann at Stanford University, USA: The Music Treasury celebrates Burkard Schliessmann. Presented by Gary Lemco and Lorrin M. Koran. 6 February 2022, 7–9 pm. Works from Joh. Seb. Bach, Robert Schumann, Frédéric Chopin and Alexander Scriabin.
- KING-FM: Burkard Schliessmann plays Chopin; 27 July 2020
- WDPR: Discover Classical: New at Noon, USA: Burkard Schliessmann plays Chopin; 6 September 2016
- WWFM: The Piano Matters with David Dubal, USA: Burkard Schliessmann plays Bach; 16 March 2016
- Hessian Radio in Frankfurt/Main, Germany, hr2 Doppelkopf; February 2012
- WSMC: Burkard Schliessmann "Live in University of Tennessee", Knoxville, Cleveland, USA; January 2012
- SWR-Radio in Baden-Baden, Germany, Treffpunkt Klassik extra; 2008 and 2010
- WDR-Cologne, Germany, TonArt; 2008 and 2010
- ZDF: aspekte: TV-portrait of Burkard Schliessmann, 1994
- WDR: Russian salon music: Scriabin and Rachmaninoff, 1995; Production: José Montes-Baquer, Direction: Enrique Sánchez Lansch
- WDR: Liszt: Piano Transcriptions of Schubert Songs – Godowsky: Symphonic Metamorphoses on Waltzes and Themes of Johann Strauss, 1997. Production: José Montes-Baquer, Lothar Mattner, Direction: Claus Viller, Agnes Meth
- Bayerischer Rundfunk: Munich Piano Summer Festival 1993, Philharmony in Gasteig (Live recording: Bach-Busoni, Scriabin, Chopin); A Loft Production (Manfred Frei) in co-production with the BR (Korbinian Meyer). Direction: Dieter Hens
- ZDF: ZDF-Morgenmagazin: TV-portrait of Burkard Schliessmann; December 1992
- ZDF: Erstklassisch! CD presentation (Scriabin: Piano Works, Opp. 2–74, Bayer BR 100 161); December 1990

== Memberships ==
Schliessmann is a member (Master Instructor) of the Professional Association of Diving Instructors (PADI) and of the Canon Professional Network. He is also a long-term member of the Frankfurter Gesellschaft für Handel, Industrie, Wissenschaft und Kultur, Lions Clubs International and American Guild of Organists.
