= WUTC =

Public radio station in Chattanooga, Tennessee

Coordinates: 35.207°N 85.281°W

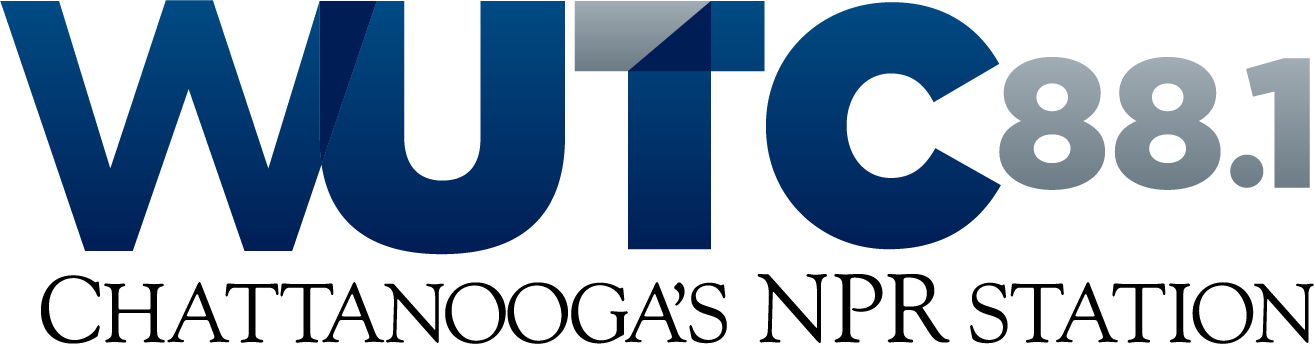
- Chattanooga, Tennessee; United States
- Broadcast area: Chattanooga metropolitan area; Tennessee Valley
- Frequency: 88.1 MHz (HD Radio)
- Branding: WUTC

Programming
- Format: Public Radio, AAA and talk
- Affiliations: NPR; PRX; APM

Ownership
- Owner: University of Tennessee at Chattanooga

History
- First air date: March 1980
- Call sign meaning: University of Tennessee at Chattanooga

Technical information
- Licensing authority: FCC
- Facility ID: 69325
- Class: C1
- ERP: 30,000 watts
- HAAT: 271 meters (889 ft)

Links
- Public license information: Public file; LMS
- Webcast: Listen live
- Website: wutc.org

WUTC (88.1 FM) is a non-commercial radio station licensed to Chattanooga, Tennessee, United States, serving both the Chattanooga metropolitan area and the Tennessee Valley. It is owned by the University of Tennessee at Chattanooga and broadcasts from inside room number 115 on the first floor of the Administrative Services Building on the campus of UTC on Palmetto Street. It is an NPR member station and broadcasts news programs plus a variety of music, including adult album alternative and related genres.

WUTC's transmitter is sited on Sawyer Cemetery Road in Walden. The signal can be heard in parts of Tennessee, Georgia, Alabama and North Carolina.

== History ==
=== Early years ===
WUTC signed on the air in March 1980. In its early years, it aired a classical music radio format, with news and educational shows. Another Chattanooga non-commercial station, WSMC-FM, also airs classical music. WUTC's studios were in Race Hall on the UTC campus.

Until 1988, WUTC rebroadcast the morning programming of WUOT-FM in Knoxville. At that point, WUTC obtained its own satellite downlink and was able to obtain nationally syndicated programming from public radio networks on its own.

=== NPR affiliation ===
In October 1995, WUTC became the exclusive home in the Chattanooga market for several NPR programs, including Morning Edition, All Things Considered, Car Talk and Weekend Edition. That's when 90.5 WSMC-FM dropped most NPR programming due to conflicts with religious programming on its schedule. WSMC-FM is owned by Southern Adventist University and it devotes some hours on Fridays and Saturdays to Adventist programming.

Today, WUTC maintains a mix of syndicated programming and local music shows in its weekday schedule, with a focus on syndicated shows almost exclusively on weekends. In July 2002, WUTC began streaming its broadcast online. In May 2006, it became the first Chattanooga radio station (public or commercial) to simulcast its broadcast in HD Radio format. In 2022, WUTC moved its studios and offices from its longtime location in Cadek Hall to the 7th floor of the State Office Building at 540 McCallie Ave., relocating in 2024 to the UTC Administrative Services Building on Palmetto Street during the renovation of 540 McCallie.

=== Controversy ===
In March 2017, the University of Tennessee at Chattanooga fired WUTC reporter Jacqui Helbert, who had interviewed state politicians about a transgender bathroom bill. The political figures alleged they did not know she was a journalist even though she was reportedly wearing headphones and a microphone with the WUTC logo.

The dismissal came after state legislators complained to university officials. Station and university officials said that Helbert breached journalistic ethics by not identifying herself as a journalist or giving the legislators a chance to comment before the story aired. However, critics claimed station and university officials overreacted out of fear that the legislature would reduce the station's funding.

== Programming ==
WUTC airs a mix of news and talk programs and adult album alternative (AAA) music shows on weekdays with other genres heard on weekends. Popular weekday shows from NPR include Morning Edition, All Things Considered and Fresh Air. Once-a-week specialty shows include On The Media, The Moth Radio Hour, Latino USA, Travel with Rick Steves, The New Yorker Radio Hour, Radiolab, The TED Radio Hour, Freakonomics Radio, Left, Right and Center and Wait, Wait, Don't Tell Me.

Weekday music shows are hosted by Richard Windham (late mornings) and Haley Solomon (early evenings). Specialty music shows, heard nights and weekends, include programs on acoustic, bluegrass, jazz, folk, blues and Celtic music.
