= Tyler Rand =

Musician

- Born: Holden, Massachusetts
- Education: Southern Adventist University (B.S.); Harvard University
- Occupation: Executive Director of the Ann Arbor Symphony Orchestra
- Known for: Arts management

Tyler Rand (born 1991) is an American arts executive and the current executive director of the Ann Arbor Symphony Orchestra.

== Education ==
He graduated from Southern Adventist University with a BS in music theory and literature. Rand also attended Harvard University, where he was active as a vocal soloist with the Harvard–Radcliffe Collegium Musicum.

== Early life and career ==
Tyler Rand was raised in Holden, Massachusetts. He pursued an acting career at an early age and appeared in musical theater productions and independent films, including productions of Big (musical) and The Music Man in Worcester, Massachusetts.

Rand began his career at WSMC-FM in Chattanooga, Tennessee, where he served in programming, fundraising, marketing, and community engagement roles. During this time, he was selected to attend the Holmberg Arts Leadership Institute in Chattanooga. In January 2018, Rand commissioned a new work for violinist Holly Mulcahy, concertmaster of the Chattanooga Symphony and Opera, to be written by composer Wang Jie. Rand also performed as an oboist with the Chattanooga Symphony and Opera and the Contemporary Symphony of Berklee College of Music. He was a first place winner in the 2011 Andrews University International Music Competition and a winner of the 2014 Southern Adventist University Concerto Competition.

In October 2019, Rand was named executive director of the Ann Arbor Symphony Orchestra after serving in marketing roles with the organization. During his time as marketing director of the symphony, he created a monthly concert subscription program for students. In 2020, Rand led the orchestra through a series of concert cancellations due to the COVID-19 pandemic and created a series of virtual concerts filmed without audience featuring the organization's musicians. In November 2020, Rand announced the creation of the Ann Arbor Symphony Orchestra's online educational platform designed to support music teachers in virtual classrooms.
