= Southern College =

Southern College may refer to:

- Southern College of Seventh-day Adventists (1982–1996), later Southern Adventist University, in Collegedale, Tennessee, U.S.
- Florida Southern College, in Lakeland, Florida, U.S.
