= Nachtstücke =

Set of four character pieces for piano by Robert Schumann

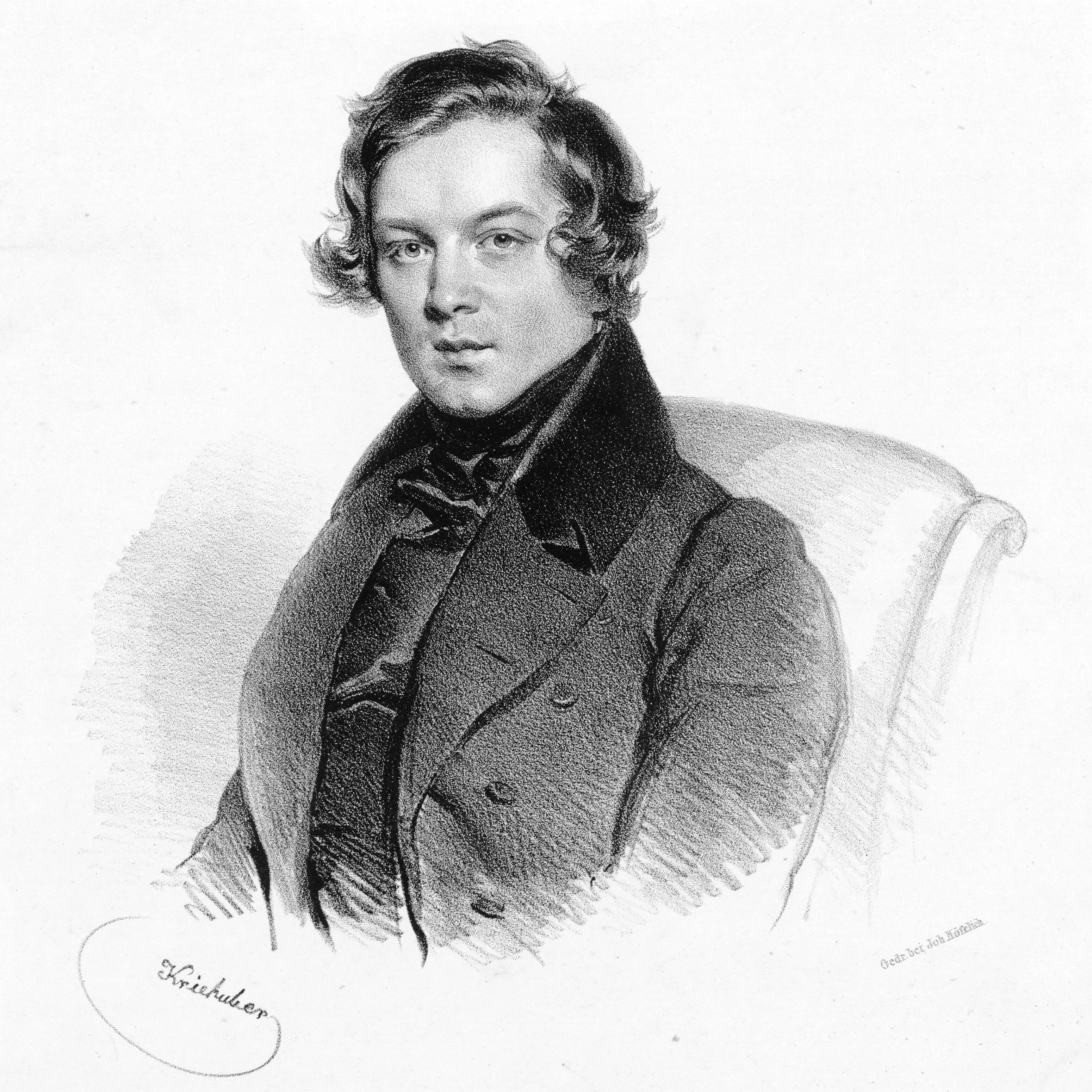
Robert Schumann in 1839

The Nachtstücke (Night Pieces), Op. 23 are a set of four character pieces for piano by the German composer and pianist Robert Schumann.

== Historical background ==
The Nachtstücke were composed in 1839 together with Faschingsschwank aus Wien and published one year later. The Intermezzo from Faschingsschwank was originally published as a supplement to the Neue Zeitschrift and identified as a 'fragment from the Nachtstücke which are to appear shortly'. Schumann envisaged the following titles for the four pieces:

1. Trauerzug ("Funeral procession")
2. Kuriose Gesellschaft ("Strange company")
3. Nächtliches Gelage ("Nocturnal revelries")
4. Rundgesang mit Solostimmen ("Roundelay with solo voices")

These titles were not included in the original edition.

=== Death of brother ===
Schumann wrote the Nachtstücke under extremely stressful circumstances. He was spending the winter in Vienna. On March 30, 1839, he received a letter concerning the imminent death of his older brother Eduard (1799–1839), which could have meant economic disaster to the family's publishing business. In a letter to his fiancée Clara Wieck he wrote, "Wouldn’t you leave me if I were now to become a very poor man and told you to leave me because I would bring you nothing but sorrow?".

Because he had premonitions of his brother's death, he wanted to call his new composition Corpse Fantasia.

"I always saw funeral processions, coffins, unhappy and despairing people. [...] Often I was so distraught that tears flowed and I didn’t know why—then [Eduard's wife] Therese's letter arrived and I knew why".

While working on his Corpse Fantasia Schumann always got stuck "at a place where it seemed as if someone was sobbing 'O God' from a heavy heart".

Schumann left Vienna for Zwickau, Germany on April 5, 1839, one day before his brother would die there. (He actually missed the funeral.) He wrote to Clara:

"Half past three on Saturday morning, while traveling, I heard a chorale of trombones—it was the moment Eduard died. [...] I still feel stunned by all the exertion. [...] Without you I long ago would have been where he is now".

Schumann eventually heeded the advice of Clara concerning the title of the work: "The public won’t understand what you mean and it will bother them. I think you should settle for the general title Nightpieces".

=== Schiller's Funeral Phantasy ===
18th century poets apparently were less scrupulous. Friedrich von Schiller did write a Leichenphantasie which may have inspired Schumann. The opening fits the mood of Schumann's Funeral Procession:

Mit erstorbnem Scheinen
Steht der Mond auf todtenstillen Hainen,
Seufzend streicht der Nachtgeist durch die Luft –
Nebelwolken schauern,
Sterne trauern
Bleich herab, wie Lampen in der Gruft.
Gleich Gespenstern, stumm und hohl und hager,
Zieht in schwarzem Todtenpompe dort
Ein Gewimmel nach dem Leichenlager
Unterm Schauerflor der Grabnacht fort. [...]

Lo! on high the moon, her lustre dead,
O'er the death-like grove uplifts her head,
Sighing flits the spectre through the gloom--
Misty clouds are shivering,
Pallid stars are quivering,
Looking down, like lamps within a tomb.
Spirit-like, all silent, pale, and wan,
Marshall'd in procession dark and sad,
To the sepulchre a crowd moves on,
In the grave-night's dismal emblems clad. [...]

(Trans. Edgar A. Bowring. New York: Hurst & Company, 1872)

=== Romantic traits ===
There is no obvious programmatic relationship between Schumann's Night Pieces and E.T.A. Hoffmann’s narrations collected under the same title, but the fantastic, gloomy and macabre mood is similar.

== The pieces ==
=== Nachtstück 1 ===
Funeral procession
C Major

The Trauerzug has the indication 'Mehr langsam, oft zurückhaltend' ('More slow, often holding back' [the tempo]). The image of ghostly groping is evoked by the short eighth note chords in piano, the harmonic uncertainty—only after eight bars do we reach a secure C major and last not least the rhythmic displacement of the strong beat. In the militaristically solemn funeral marches of Beethoven and Chopin, the dotted rhythm naturally emphasizes the downbeat. In Schumann we still have some rudiments of this militaristic march rhythm, but ironically it is placed on the 'wrong' beat emphasizing the fourth beat and creating a feeling of mocking hesitance. The characteristic repeated motif of descending seconds (b flat-a-g-f-e, f-e-d-c-b) followed by a modified ascending inversion (c-d-e-e-e), and with a dotted rhythmic figure at the third and fourth notes is clearly reminiscent of the characteristic ostinato phrase of the fourth movement of Hector Berlioz's Symphonie Fantastique, which is entitled "The procession to the stake" ("Marche au supplice") (see sections 50–52, bars 17ff). Schumann had written a critique of Berlioz's symphony in "Neue Zeitschrift für Musik " four years earlier, in 1835 , which was by far the longest of his articles. Theo Hirsbrunner has pointed out other signs of influence of Berlioz on Schumann. The same idea is used as opening for the next movement of Nachtstücke in varied form (stepwise descending and ascending seconds, with a characteristic accentuation of the upbeat quarter, again reminding the upbeat half note of the ostinato theme in the fourth movement of Symphonie Fantastique). The theme is recapitulated in heroic fashion before collapsing into nothingness. The omissions of chords and the subsequent 'melodic holes' in the last four bars foreshadow 20th century techniques.

=== Nachtstück 2 ===
Curious gathering
F Major

Kuriose Versammlung – (Markiert und lebhaft "Marked and lively") abounds with frequent digressions. The constant mood shifts—from frolicsome derisiveness to clownish, coquettish mirth—result in a lack of cohesiveness. The programmatic title indicates that this effect was probably intended by Schumann.

The mechanical quality of the middle part suggests an ‘automaton'. (The mechanism winds down at the ritardando, B♭. 93–94). The idea of an artificial ‘person’ haunted Romantic imagination and 'automatons' appear frequently in writers such as E.T.A. Hoffmann or Edgar Allan Poe (1809–49). Carl Reinecke included ‘Godfather Drosselmeyer’s Automatons’ from Hoffmann's fairy tale The Nutcracker and the Mouse King in his piano four-hand setting of the tale. Hoffmann's narration The Sandmann from Night Pieces introduces the famous Olimpia automaton. Nathanael, who is the main character in this narration, falls in love with Olimpia, forgetting his true love, Clara.

=== Nachtstück 3 ===
Night binge
D♭ Major

Nächtliches Gelage – (Mit großer Lebhaftigkeit "With great vivacity") maybe described as a ‘nocturnal Faschingsschwank’ or 'noctural "Carnival Scene"' and there are unmistakable similarities between these two pieces written at Vienna. But the passion is less healthy in the Nachtstücke. An intoxicated yearning explodes in impulsive outbursts of energy followed by ecstatic reveling. These indulgences are interrupted by two 'intermezzos', the first one a sinister murmuring of repressed agitation, the second one a ghostly 'Wilde Jagd' (Wild Hunt). Apparently unrelated fragments, these episodes do have a close motivic relationship: The first ‘intermezzo’ is fashioned from the closing section of the main theme and the second ‘intermezzo’ imitates the climax of the main theme's A♭ major section.

=== Nachtstück 4 ===
Roundelay with solo voices
F Major

Schumann is often criticized for using structure merely as a framework on which to spread the themes. The resultant ‘incoherency’ is often attributed to the composer's declining mental health. The fact though remains that Schumann's predilection for allusions has rendered many relationships too subtle for the (non artistic) analyst's senses.

Rundgesang mit Solostimmen – (Ad libitum. Einfach "Freely. Simple"), for example, certainly remembers the march rhythm of the Funeral Procession but has been changed to a simple folk melody, lute-like arpeggios have been added and the displacement of the dotted rhythm has been 'corrected', evoking a feeling of consolation.

The extremely laconic introduction is a blissfully superfluous exclamation of ‘Eusebius’ announcing a conclusive epilogue.
