= WUOT =

Public radio station in Knoxville, Tennessee

- Knoxville, Tennessee; United States
- Broadcast area: Knoxville metropolitan area; Eastern Tennessee
- Frequency: 91.9 MHz (HD Radio)
- Branding: UT Public Radio

Programming
- Format: Public radio, classical, talk and jazz
- Subchannels: HD2: Public radio
- Affiliations: APM; NPR; PRX

Ownership
- Owner: University of Tennessee

History
- First air date: October 27, 1949
- Call sign meaning: University of Tennessee

Technical information
- Licensing authority: FCC
- Facility ID: 69161
- Class: C
- ERP: 80,000 watts
- HAAT: 482 meters (1,581 ft)
- Transmitter coordinates: 36°0′19″N 83°56′23″W

Links
- Public license information: Public file; LMS
- Webcast: Listen live
- Website: www.wuot.org

WUOT (91.9 FM, "UT Public Radio") is a noncommercial educational radio station licensed in Knoxville, Tennessee, United States. WUOT is the NPR station for the Knoxville metropolitan area and much of Eastern Tennessee. Owned by the University of Tennessee, the station airs a mix of news, classical music and jazz, along with programming from NPR, American Public Media and Public Radio Exchange. WUOT's studios are located on the University of Tennessee campus in the 209 Communications Building located on Circle Park Drive, in Knoxville, Tennessee.

The transmitter is in Sharp's Ridge Memorial Park, off of Interstate 640 in Knoxville, Tennessee.

== History ==
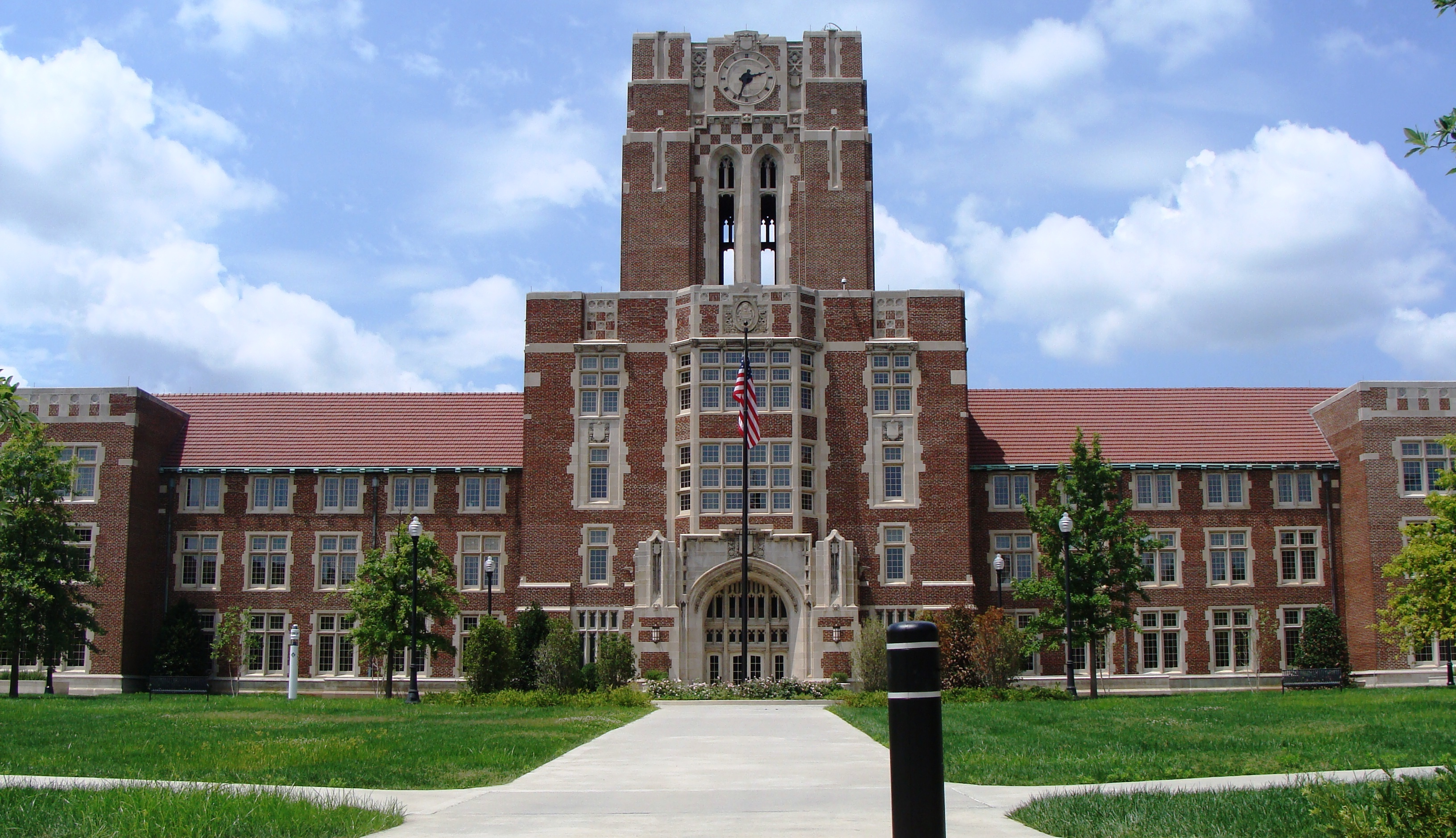
Ayres Hall was the original home of WUOT, including its first transmitter site

On June 2, 1949, the University of Tennessee filed with the Federal Communications Commission for a construction permit to build a new noncommercial FM radio station in Knoxville. The idea to bring the university a radio station had been part of future U.S. senator Howard Baker's campaign platform for student body president while he was attending school at the University of Tennessee. The FCC approved the application a month later, at which time the university announced that it was building studios on the ground floor of Ayres Hall and had bought equipment from defunct radio station WKPB. WKPB had been a commercial station on 93.3 FM owned by The Knoxville Journal that broadcast from October 15, 1947 to April 15, 1949; the Journal, citing the uncertainty created by the advent of television, shuttered the station. It sold its phonograph records to the general public, and sold its equipment to the university. The university then used this equipment to set up its own radio station.

WUOT signed on, and aired its first broadcast, on October 27, 1949. The station's first regular programming schedule included broadcasts for five and a half hours a day, and it had two full-time staff. WUOT broadcast informational programs, classical music, and reports of student activities, and was entirely operated by students. The radio station's facilities also provided a home for the university's offering of 25 radio programs, which were heard in 1950 on 17 commercial radio stations in Tennessee. By 1956, the circulation of the university's productions had increased to 65 stations.

Originally broadcasting with 3,500 watts, the station was approved to increase power to 70,500 watts in 1955, with the station resuming operations from its new facilities on November 29. This was made possible when station WROL gave the university a higher-power antenna and a 10 kW transmitter worth $50,000; WUOT's transmitter facility was relocated to a parcel of university-owned land near the John Tarleton Institute. WROL had operated an FM station until 1951. A large crane was necessary to extend the tower a further 75 feet (23 m). The increase brought WUOT to listeners in Bristol, Chattanooga, and as far away as Asheville, North Carolina, and Blue Ridge, Georgia. The WUOT transmitter was relocated to Sharp's Ridge in 1961. In 1968, the station boosted its power to the maximum 100,000 watts and began stereo broadcasts. In 1971, the station added additional hours of jazz music to its schedule in response to requests from inmates at the Brushy Mountain State Penitentiary.

Discussions began to build a dedicated communications building in the mid-1960s, and the station moved into its new Circle Park home in 1969; the facility offered WUOT more room, and newer equipment, than it had in Ayres Hall. WUOT was a charter member of National Public Radio and carried the first broadcast of All Things Considered in 1971; the new network program replaced its light classical "dinner hour" music, which prompted the ire of some listeners. The station also began adding local news and public affairs programming in the mid-1970s, though the development of this area of the station came in fits and starts until the mid-1990s, when the station significantly expanded its news operation.

WUOT remained a fine arts-oriented station, though students desired a station for rock music that catered more to their tastes; they would get one when WUTK-FM went on the air in the early 1980s. In one case, the presence of a classical music outlet in Knoxville was reassuring. When future interim UT president Jan Simek moved from California to take a faculty position in Knoxville in 1984, his mother worried that he might not be able to listen to "real" music; when she visited him in Knoxville and learned of WUOT, her fears were assuaged, and she ended up moving to Knoxville herself. WUOT's reach expanded when the University of Tennessee at Chattanooga signed on its WUTC in 1980. In order to get on air quickly, the new Chattanooga station simulcast WUOT's output. The UTC station later severed its ties with WUOT in order to broadcast its own programming.

Former logo

In 2017, the station partnered with an independent producer to create "TruckBeat", a truck that traveled around east Tennessee to areas not typically covered by public radio and reported the impacts of the opioid epidemic on rural communities. The truck itself was a former WBIR-TV live truck that the station had purchased to cover the 1982 World's Fair. TruckBeat was honored by the Online News Association for topical reporting among small newsrooms.

== Programming ==
WUOT airs news and information programming weekday mornings and afternoons, including NPR programs Morning Edition, Fresh Air and All Things Considered. Classical music is featured on middays and weeknights, jazz is played on Friday evenings, and Mountain Stage and The Thistle and Shamrock air Saturday evenings. Sunday evenings feature Pipedreams and Hearts of Space. Specialty shows air throughout the weekend.

== HD Radio ==
WUOT broadcasts in the HD Radio digital standard and carries a second subchannel of programming, known as WUOT-2. WUOT-2 was launched in 2009 with additional public radio talk programs that the main channel did not carry, like Marketplace, as well as several specialty music shows.
