= Southern Adventist University =

Private university in Collegedale Tennessee, US

Coordinates: 35.04813°N 85.05100°W

- Former names: Graysville Academy (1892–1897); Southern Industrial School (1897–1901); Southern Training School (1901–1916); Southern Junior College (1916–1944); Southern Missionary College (1944–1982); Southern College (1982–1996)
- Motto: Power for Mind and Soul
- Type: Private university
- Established: 1892; 134 years ago
- Affiliations: NAICU; CIC
- Religious affiliation: Seventh-day Adventist
- Endowment: $66.7 million (2025)
- President: Ken Shaw
- Faculty: 254
- Administrative staff: 324
- Students: 3,360 (2025–2026)
- Undergraduates: 3,008
- Postgraduates: 352
- Location: Collegedale, Tennessee, United States
- Campus: Rural, 1,000 acres (4.0 km^{2})
- Website: www.southern.edu

Southern Adventist University is a private Seventh-day Adventist university in Collegedale, Tennessee. It is owned and operated by the Southern Union Conference of Seventh-day Adventists. It was founded in 1892 in Graysville, Tennessee, as Graysville Academy and was the first Adventist school in the southern U.S. Due to the need for additional space for expansion the school relocated in 1916 and was renamed Southern Junior College. In 1944, Southern began awarding baccalaureate degrees and was renamed Southern Missionary College. In 1996 the institution started conferring master's degrees and adopted its current name.

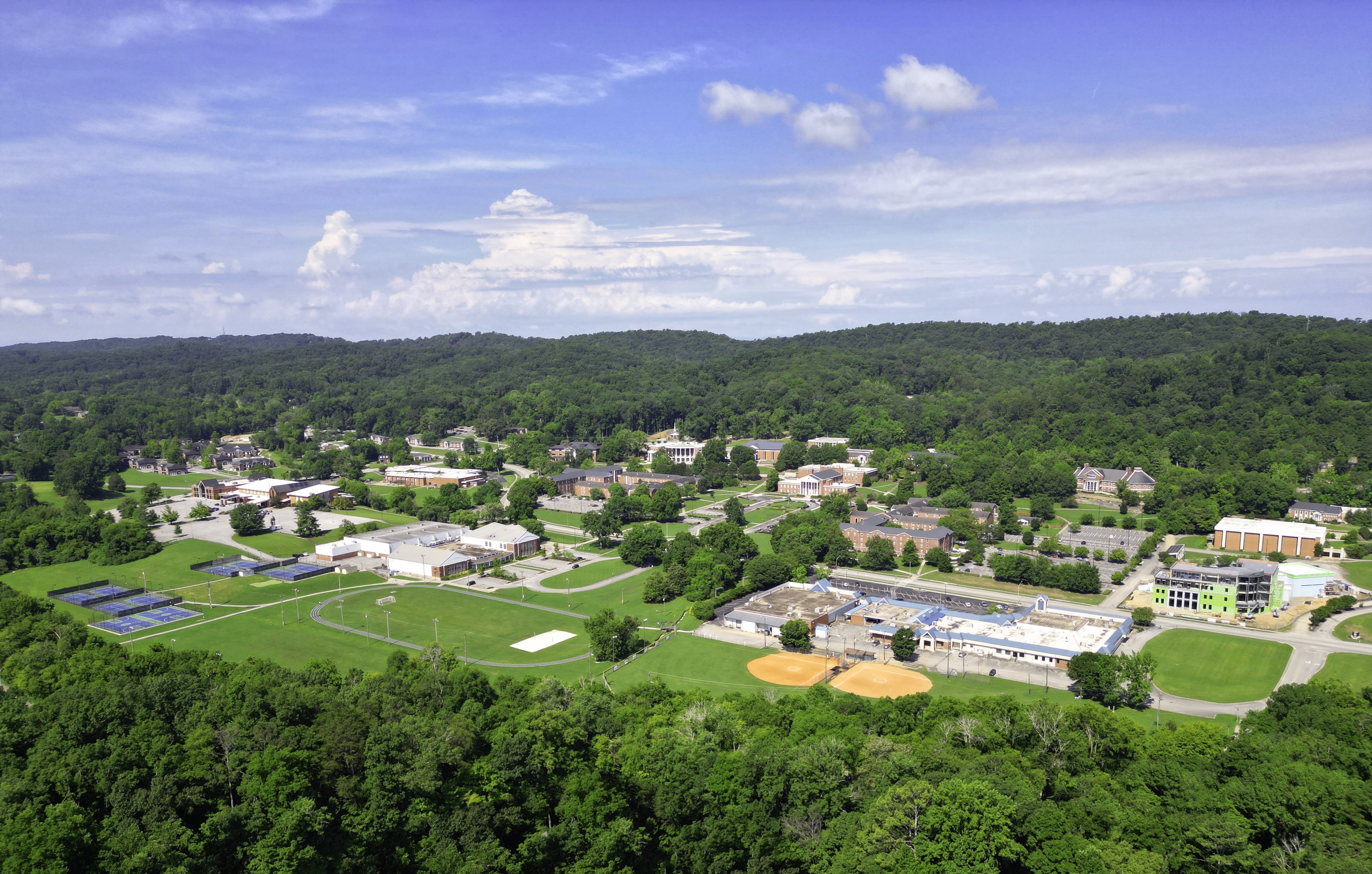
Southern Adventist University campus in 2025

Southern offers associate, baccalaureate, master's, and doctoral degrees. The university and its programs are accredited by multiple organizations including the Commission on Colleges of the Southern Association of Colleges and Schools. Its Institute of Archaeology offers an undergraduate degree in biblical archaeology; Southern is one of only two schools which offer the degree. It is known for its emphasis on Adventist beliefs and conservative religious and social practices, and is considered the most conservative of the Seventh-day Adventist schools in North America. The college operates a radio station (WSMC-FM), a health food store and a wellness center. Enrollment was 3,053 students in 2010, its highest level to date.

== History ==
Southern's roots stem from the establishment of Graysville Academy in Graysville, Tennessee, in 1892, in a part of the South much affected by the American Civil War. The area saw the battle of Chickamauga and the Chattanooga campaign, and was the staging ground for Sherman's Atlanta campaign. The academy was privately funded at first, with no financial support from the Adventist church. In 1897 it was renamed the Southern Industrial School and then Southern Training School in 1901. The school moved to the community of Thatcher's Switch in 1916, renaming it Collegedale. In 1943, Kenneth A. Wright became president of the school. During Wright's administration, Southern Junior College became accredited as a four-year college. A new name, Southern Missionary College, was adopted in 1944, and Southern granted its first baccalaureate degrees two years later. When the school became a university in 1996, the trustees voted on a new name: Southern Adventist University.

=== Graysville Academy, 1892–1897 ===
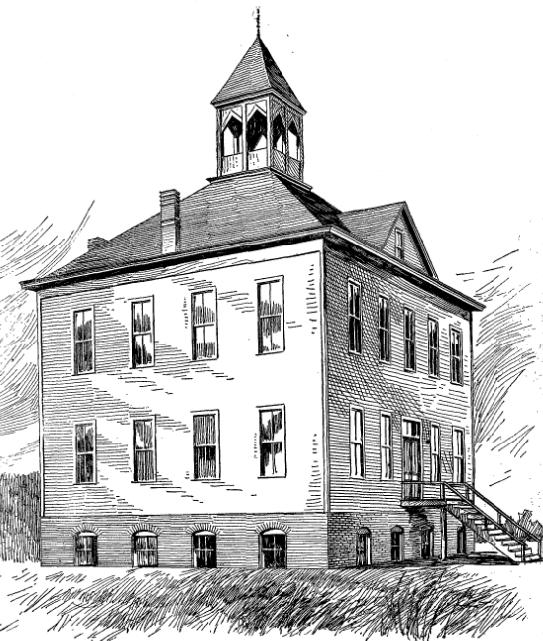
Graysville Academy, 1895

The Graysville Seventh-day Adventist Church was organized on September 8, 1888, and by the fall of 1890, the members had dedicated a church building. R.M. Kilgore, former president of the Illinois Conference had been asked to supervise the church's work in the Southern United States. He had just moved to Graysville and was present for the church dedication. As the superintendent for the church's work in the South, Kilgore repeatedly advocated the establishment of a school.

Kilgore invited George W. Colcord (1843–1902), to come to Graysville and establish a school. Colcord was the founder of Milton Academy, which is the forerunner of Walla Walla University. The General Conference Education Secretary, W. W. Prescott, along with Kilgore and Colcord worked together to establish the school at Graysville. Colcord and his wife Ada began the school. The first term began in February, 1892, with 23 students. The second term began in September of that year. By January 1893 Colcord reported that 62 students were in attendance. By 1893 there were three full-time teachers and three part-time teachers. Prescott considered the positive attitude of the school's faculty, students and supporters to be indicators of the school's future success and good reason to start other such schools in the South.

During 1892, Colcord operated the school privately. At the session of the Seventh-day Adventist General Conference held at Battle Creek, Michigan from February 17 to March 6, 1893, the church officially took over the school. This first school in the South inspired the session to recommend that other schools also be established.

In the fall of 1894, Graysville Academy faced a crisis. Fourteen of the members of the Graysville Church were indicted for having violated the Tennessee Sunday law. This included Colcord, his nephew, I. C. Colcord, and M. C. Sturdevant, manager of the boys' dormitory.

The church members found guilty refused to pay the fines, choosing to go to prison instead. The imprisonment of the school's leaders resulted in its immediate closing for the rest of the year. The students, some of whom were ready to graduate, returned to their homes.

=== Southern Industrial School, 1897–1901 ===
In November 1897, the district conference voted to change the school's name to Southern Industrial School. The name change reflected a change in the school's emphasis. Industries were established including a wagon and blacksmith shop, a broom shop, a printshop and a school farm. The farm grew peaches, pears and many types of berries and vegetables.

=== Southern Training School, 1901–1916 ===
The Southern Union Conference was organized in April 1901. Kilgore, the superintendent of the Southern District, known as District 2, was elected the first president of the Southern Union Conference. The headquarters was in Graysville. The General Conference arranged for the Southern Union to take over the operation of the Southern Industrial School. The property was transferred to the Southern Union. They renamed the school the Southern Training School. It offered 14 grades of instruction.

=== Southern Junior College, 1916–1945 ===
==== Relocation ====
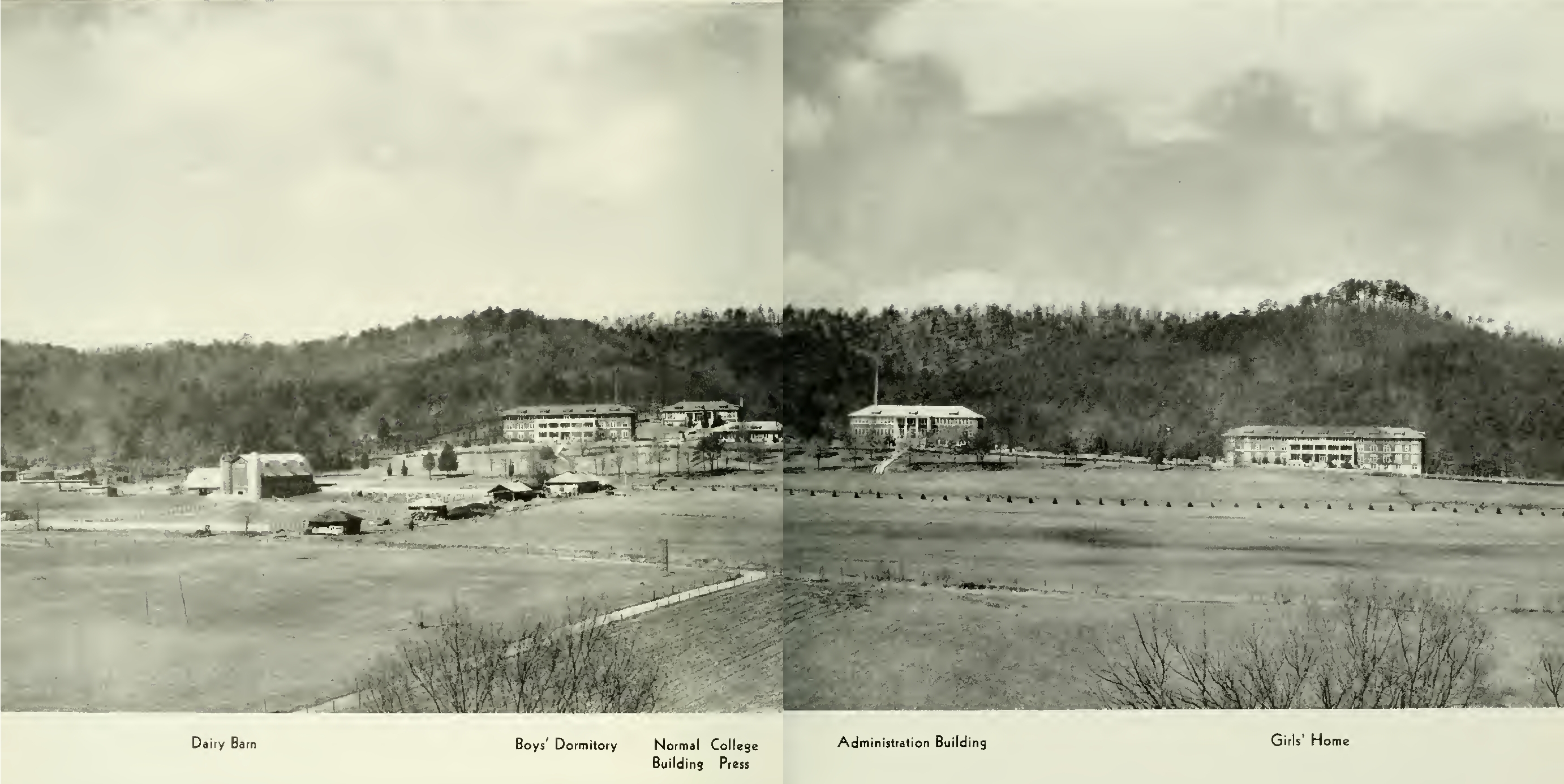
Southern Junior College in 1942 on its site at Collegedale in the Tennessee River Valley

Eventually the Graysville school outgrew its 7-acre (2.8 ha) site. Church leaders looked for a larger plot of land. They believed "that the only education worth while in these strenuous days is that practical kind which teaches the student to actually do with his hand the things he learns about in books." To provide for this practical concern, they found a larger property. Plans were made to relocate the college program to a 285-acre (115 ha) farm at Thatcher's Switch east of Chattanooga. The move from Graysville to Thatcher's Switch involved moving most of the school's equipment, livestock, and implements to the new site fifty miles away. The school moved and opened in its new location by October, 1916. The community was soon renamed Collegedale and the school as Southern Junior College. The term training school had become associated with reform schools while at the same time the junior college designation had become a popular one.

Graysville Academy continued on at the original site as a church and conference-sponsored secondary boarding academy until 1938.

==== Pioneer years ====
In 1916, the school's property holdings totaled $32,000. Two years later, due mainly to the construction of additional buildings on campus, the school's holdings increased to $113,000. Many students earned their tuition by helping to construct these buildings. Southern was financially supported by two union conferences of the Church's North American administration. The school organized construction bees. Interested church members came from across the South to help in these bees.

At first, the school taught only students in grades 1–12 with a total enrollment of 59 students. In 1918, three students were taking post-high school level classes. The total student enrollment at this time was 175.

Southern Junior College served two union conferences of Seventh-day Adventists, the Southern and the Southeastern. Later these two would be reorganized into one, the Southern Union Conference. In 1920, Lynn H. Wood, the president of the college, presented a major report to meetings for both union conferences. He reviewed the events of the first four years at the Ooltewah location.

According to Wood, enrollment grew quickly because of a tuition work program. Students of limited means realized they could get an education and improve themselves. This put a strain on housing. But the desire for an education motivated the students to cope with those early inadequate facilities, "Students have been willing to live in shacks and tents, to put up with all kinds of inconvenience, in order that they might receive the character development that the school had for them." Wood referred to these first few years as the "pioneer years." He wrote that the positive spiritual attitude of the students made these years the most enjoyable that one could wish for.

The college built the girls' dormitory first. The girls moved in before it was finished, even before there was any heating, doors or chairs. They used "curtains for doors, sat upon their trunks for chairs — any way to get along."

==== Faith community support ====
The building of the boys' dormitory began in the summer of 1918. The students helped build it, and, in doing so, many earned their way through school. Shortly after the beginning of the school year in 1918, a "Workers' Bee" took place. Church workers from all across the South and from church headquarters in Washington, D.C. came to the college to build the boys' dormitory. For two and a half weeks they worked and associated with the students. They succeeded in putting up most of the framework.

Other help from the Adventist faith community included a $6,000 donation by the Southern Publishing Association for a water supply system and another "Working Bee" to build a large dairy barn, a blacksmith shop, and a corn crib. People interested in the college's success bought surrounding properties and donated them to the institution, more than doubling the school's area to close to 600 acres (2.4 km^{2}). This allowed the school to protect itself from families moving so close that they hindered their young people attending from learning some independence, President Wood wrote. He encouraged families to send their young people to the school, and if the cost was too high for some of them, he advised that church leaders make sure they got the help they needed for their young people to attend and live in the dormitory.

=== Southern Missionary College, 1944–1982 ===
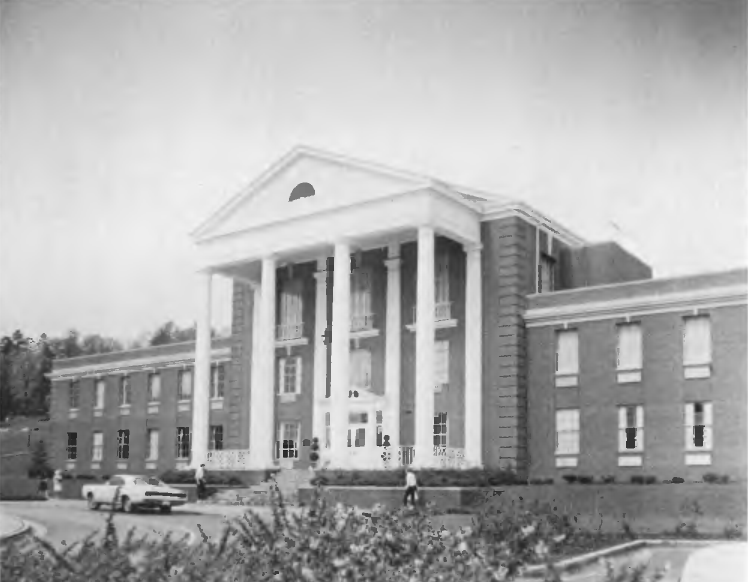
Wright Hall, the administrative building of Southern Missionary College, was completed in 1967.

In 1944, the Seventh Day Adventist General Conference Spring Council voted for Southern to become a four-year college. The enrollment that first year was the highest ever to date, 436 students. The theology, teaching and pre-nursing departments had the highest enrollments. Industries that helped students earn their tuition included a wood shop, a broom factory, a printing press, and a farm. The name Southern Missionary College was chosen at a combined meeting of the members of the college board, the union educational board, and the college faculty.

=== Southern College of Seventh-day Adventists, 1982–1996 ===
On July 1, 1982, the word "Missionary" was dropped from the school's name. The reported reasons for the change were that the general population reacted negatively to the term; foreign countries resisted accepting church workers who were from a "missionary" college; the name incorrectly identified the school as only a Bible college, rather than a fully accredited, four-year liberal arts institution; and, graduates found the name "missionary" made it more difficult for them to get a job. Southern was the last Adventist college in North America to retain "missionary" in its title. The others changed their names many years earlier.

In their official announcement of the name change, the Board of Trustees of Southern Missionary College explained that a shorter name would help popularize it. They also stated that, "The word 'Southern' has been associated with the College since its beginning—Southern Industrial School, Southern Training School, Southern Junior College, Southern Missionary College, and now Southern College."

=== Early 1980s controversy ===
Southern College found itself drawn into a wider church controversies involving Desmond Ford who was dismissed from ministry in the Adventist church in 1980, and Walter Rae, and Ronald Numbers' book, The Prophetess of Health. It began after a visit to the campus by a leading Bible scholar and theologian of the Seventh-day Adventist Church, Edward Heppenstall, on his understanding of the church's "investigative judgment" teaching, and who was also mentor to Desmond Ford. The controversy grew after a teacher from the theology department made a comment that seemed to disagree with statements made by church pioneer Ellen G. White. The incident along with other concerns led to accusations that faculty at the school did not believe in White as a prophet and led to calls for their dismissal. Southern President Frank Knittel and Board of Trustees member Tom Zwemer resigned, and Jerry Gladson, a professor of Old Testament Studies at Southern, also left the school. His credentials as a minister of the church were not renewed.

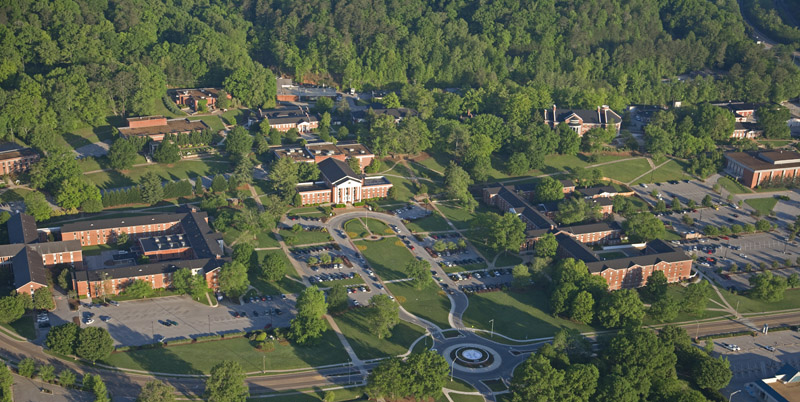
Southern Adventist University, 2011

=== Southern Adventist University, 1996–present ===
In May 1996, the Southern Association of Colleges and Schools granted approval for Southern to become an accredited Level III institution, allowing the school to confer master's degrees. By September of that year, the college's constituency approved the name change to Southern Adventist University. In 1996, attendance was 1600. Since 1996, Southern has continued to grow and build, reaching a peak enrollment of 3,053 in 2010 (compared with 2,079 in 1980).

== Academics ==
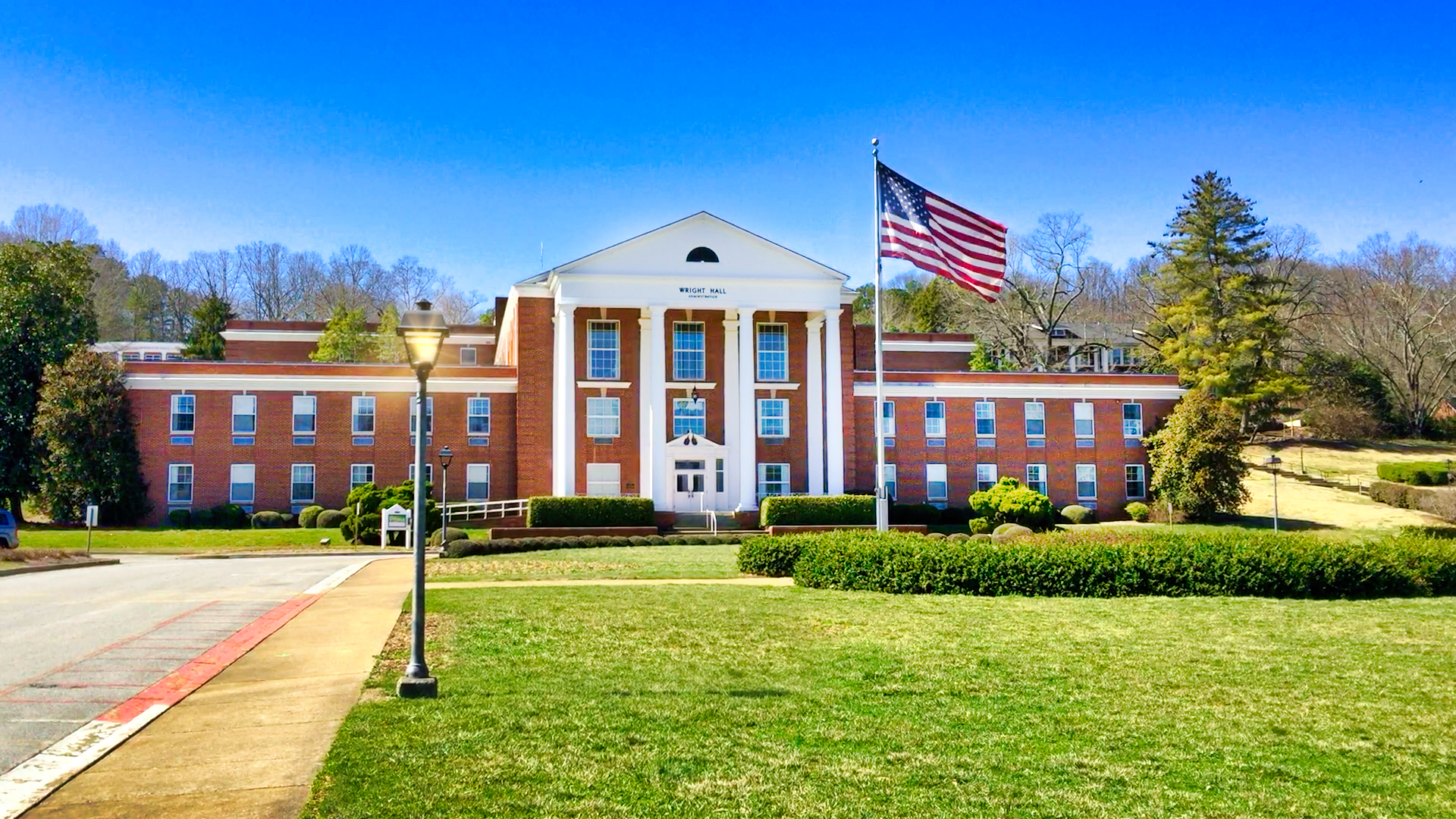
Wright Hall at Southern Adventist University in 2015

The student-faculty ratio at Southern Adventist University was 16:1 and has now improved to 13:1. Its most selected majors are biological and biomedical sciences; business, management, marketing, and related support services; education; and health professions and related clinical sciences. Southern offers 81 undergraduate degrees, with sixty majors, thirty-eight minors and two one-year certificate programs. It also offers master's degrees in business, computer science, education, psychology, nursing, religion and social work. The university is accredited by the Commission on Colleges of the Southern Association of Colleges and Schools and the Accrediting Association of Seventh-day Adventist Schools, Colleges, and Universities. In 2009, the Princeton Review, an education services company, selected Southern as one of 141 institutions it listed in its "Best in the Southeast" section.

=== School of Nursing ===
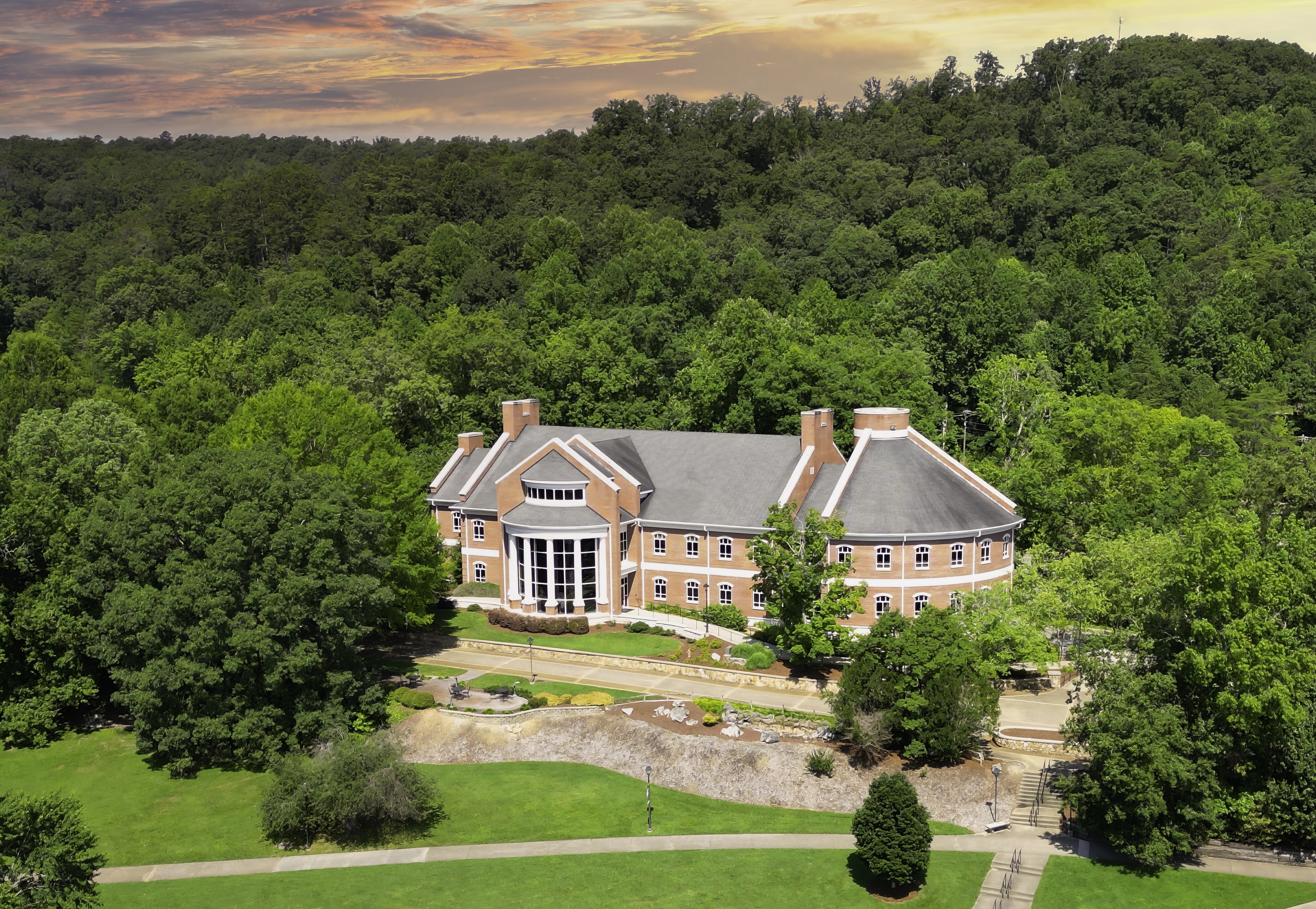
Florida Hospital Hall houses the School of Nursing

The nursing program was instituted in 1934. Upon completion of the program students were able to transfer to Florida Sanitarium and Hospital, where they could earn a diploma in nursing. In 1963, Southern's President Rees announced that the school's nursing program had received its Bachelor of Science National League of Nursing accreditation. In 2002, the master's program also received official accreditation. Southern's School of Nursing has existed on the Collegedale campus since 1956.

In 2003, the school announced an accelerated program allowing registered nurses with an associate's degree to receive a Master of Science in Nursing. At this date approximately half of Southern's nursing graduate program were non-Adventist.

In December 2010, the college temporarily suspended a home health nursing program after two of its nursing students were accosted at gunpoint in Chattanooga. The school is considering a safer, more controlled environment for the program.

In 2011, the university opened Florida Hospital Hall, a new building with twice the space of the former nursing building, to accommodate an expanding student base.

Southern Adventist University is rated in the top 15% of the country for nursing at the bachelor’s level, and top 5 Nursing Schools in Tennessee.

=== Institute of Archaeology ===
The Institute of Archaeology is part of the School of Religion. It coordinates the archaeological programs at Southern through an undergraduate degree, an archeological museum, the William G. Dever Research Library and its archaeological excavations and publications. Southern is one of two schools in the U.S. where students can pursue an undergraduate degree in biblical archaeology. The Lynn H. Wood Archaeological Museum has a collection of nearly 600 artifacts, many of which were unearthed in Palestine between 1967 and 1975.

The current Institute Director, Professor of Near Eastern Studies and Archaeology Michael Hasel, studied for his doctorate under William G. Dever at the University of Arizona. In 2000, Dever gave his artifact collection in loan to Hasel and Southern. This made the development of Southern's program possible. The artifacts, valued at $250,000, date from 3200 BC to 450 AD. The collection has an almost complete set of the many strains of pottery from this period which students can study. In 2008, Dever placed his personal library at Southern, along with 15,000 photographic slides of archaeological excavations.

=== School of Visual Art and Design ===
Wayne and Maria Hazen founded the School of Visual Art and Design in 1998. The film department produced Angel in Chains in 2003, a film "based on a true story about acceptance and forgiveness." In 2007, Southern released Secret of the Cave, a feature film which was awarded a Crystal Heart Award at the Heartland Film Festival in Indiana. The family-oriented feature was filmed in Ireland and was the first feature-length film produced at the university.

The school offers degrees in graphic design, animation, film production and fine art.

=== McKee Library ===
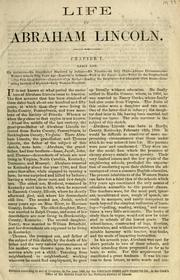
Page from Life of Abraham Lincoln by J. L. Scripps

The McKee Library is located on the campus and opened in 1970. Its collection of books and media comprises approximately 165,000 volumes on the shelves, 25,000 electronic books, subscriptions to more than 880 print and electronic periodicals and access to more than 19,000 electronic journals. The library is defined by the Thomas Memorial Collection, a major Civil War collection with more than 3,600 volumes concerning Lincoln and the Civil War, and authentic photos and newspapers. The collection has two original copies of the only Lincoln biography ever read and approved by him, the Life of Abraham Lincoln by J. L. Scripps, and a section of his original marble sarcophagus.

== Ideology ==
Southern is known for its religious and social conservatism, and it is widely regarded as the most conservative of denominationally owned Adventist colleges in North America. In 2001, Adventist noted theologian and scholar Raymond Cottrell, a "progressive Adventist", wrote that Southern operated "an agency of Southern Bible belt obscurantism."

In explaining why he placed his collection of artifacts and his personal library at Southern Adventist University, archaeologist William Dever said, "The major support for archaeology work in Israel and Jordan comes from conservative and evangelical circles where the Bible is still taken seriously and no one is more serious and committed about archaeological study in the Middle East than Adventists."

== Student life ==
The Princeton Review describes Southern as a "religiously loving environment." Most forms of jewelry are not allowed on campus, other than engagement rings, and students may be fined for not complying with this policy. Southern is a dry campus, as the Adventist Church opposes the use of alcohol. The university observes the Sabbath from sundown Friday to sundown Saturday and students are expected to refrain from secular activities during these hours.

Although Southern does not have fraternities or sororities, there are 40 clubs on campus, one of which is a chapter of the Adventist Forum, publisher of Spectrum Magazine. The Southern Accent is a weekly student-run newspaper that has been the voice of Southern students since 1926 and gives information on events and outings and "hot issues that are being talked about on campus". There are 21 student-led ministries on campus and in the community and a Student Missions program.

Southern has more than 10 miles (16 km) of hiking/mountain biking trails used by students and local community members alike.

There is a campus-wide internet network with all classrooms accessing the wireless network and a computer lab in each building with access to printing. Wireless printing is also accessible in the dormitories.

=== Dormitories ===
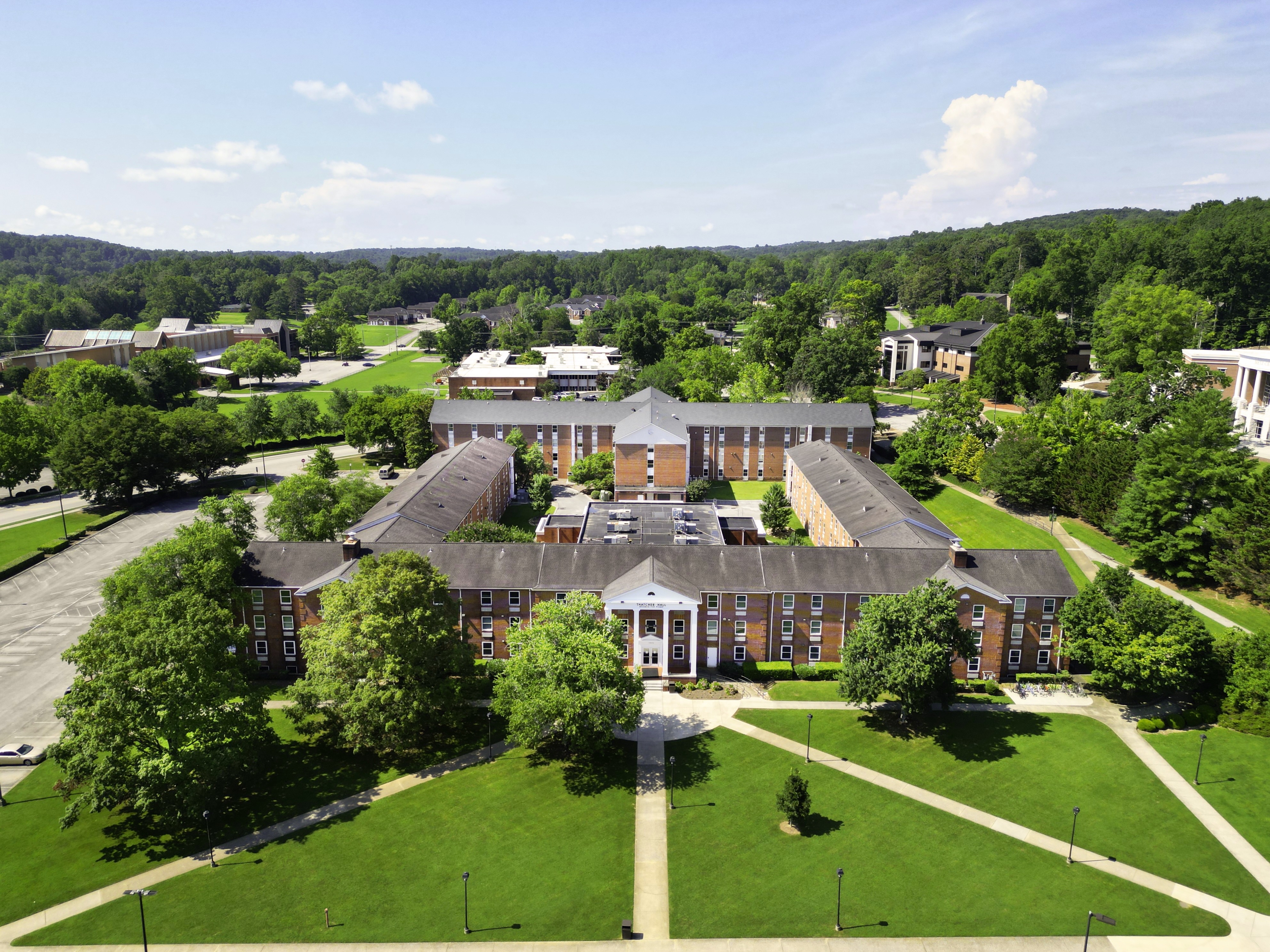
Thatcher Hall

Southern's dormitories are single gender although students can opt out of the dormitories during summer sessions or with permission from a dean. Upperclass and married students can receive exemptions from this policy. The men's dormitory is Talge Hall and the women's dormitory is Thatcher Hall. An accidental fire in Thatcher Hall in April 2005 killed one student and injured two others. The dormitories have also been used to shelter storm victims who needed short-term housing, such as after tornadoes in early 2011.

=== WSMC-FM radio station ===
Southern owns and operates FM radio station WSMC which is almost completely staffed by students and the only classical music station in the Chattanooga area. In 2003, following technical problems that caused the station to keep dropping off the air, WSMC upgraded equipment to improve its reliability. It has been in operation since 1961 and is located on campus.

== McKee Foods ==
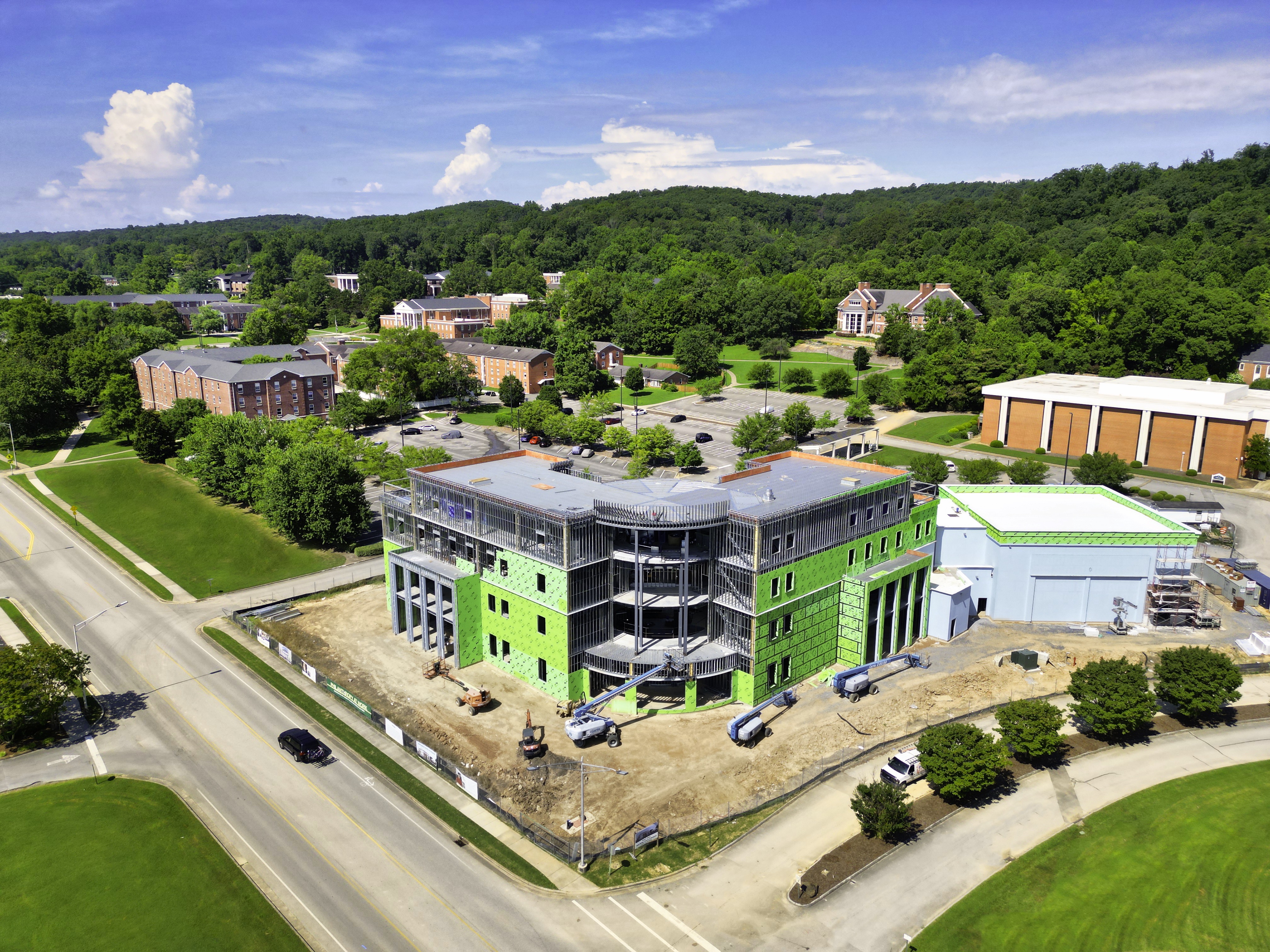
Ruth McKee School of Business under construction

McKee Foods has its headquarters beside the campus and has been an important part of school history as one of the companies which have provided jobs within walking distance for students to fund their education. It was founded by a Southern alumnus and is the headquarters for Little Debbie, Sovex and Sunbelt products. McKee Foods is one of the largest employers in Hamilton County. In 2023, Southern began construction on the $20 million Ruth McKee School of Business at the main entrance to campus. The complex is named after McKee Foods' co-founder.

== People ==
=== Principals, presidents ===
Graysville Academy, 1892–1897

- G. W. Colcord (1892–1895)
- W. T. Bland (1896–1898)

Southern Industrial School, 1897–1901

- Charles W. Irwin (1899–1900)
- N. W. Lawrence (1901)

Southern Training School, 1901–1916

- J. Ellis Tenney (1902–1905)
- M. B. Van Kirk (1906–1911)
- C. L. Stone (1912–1913)
- Lynn H. Wood (1914)
- A. N. Atteberry (1915)

Southern Junior College, 1917–1945

- Leo F. Thiel (1916–1917)
- Lynn H. Wood (1918–1921)
- Leo F. Thiel (1922–1924)
- H. H. Hamilton (1925)
- Marion E. Cady (1926)
- Henry J. Klooster (1927–1936)
- John C. Thompson (1937–1941)
- Denton E. Rebok (1942)

Southern Missionary College, 1946–1982

- Kenneth A. Wright (1943–1954)
- Thomas W. Walters (1955–1957)
- Conard N. Rees (1958–1966)
- Wilbert Schneider (1967–1970)
- Frank A. Knittel (1971–1982)

Southern College of Seventh-day Adventists, 1983–1996

- John Wagner (1983–1985)

Southern Adventist University, 1997–present

- Donald R. Sahly (1986–1997)
- Gordon Bietz (1998–2016)
- David Smith (2016–2021)
- Ken Shaw (2021–present)

=== Notable alumni ===
- Jim Davis, Class of 1965, member of North Carolina General Assembly, Senate
- Clifford Goldstein, author and editor
- Dwight Nelson, Class of 1973, author, senior pastor, Pioneer Memorial Church, Andrews University
- Ron Numbers, Class of 1963, PhD UC Berkeley, awarded the 2008 George Sarton Medal by the History of Science Society
- Cherie Priest, Class of 1998, novelist and blogger
- Tyler Rand, Class of 2016, musician and arts administrator
- Mathew Staver, founder and chairman of Liberty Counsel, former dean of Liberty University School of Law, 2006–2014

== See also ==
- List of Seventh-day Adventist colleges and universities
- List of Seventh-day Adventist medical schools
- List of Seventh-day Adventist secondary schools
- Seventh-day Adventist education
- Seventh-day Adventist Church
- Seventh-day Adventist theology
- History of the Seventh-day Adventist Church
- Adventist Colleges and Universities
- Christian school

== Sources ==
- Jones, Alonzo T.; Bollman, Calvin P., eds. (March 21, 1895). "More Religious Persecution in Tennessee: Seventh-day Adventist Academy at Graysville Closed by Religious Intolerance" (PDF). American Sentinel. 10 (12). New York, New York: Pacific Press Publishing Association: 1–2.
- Pettibone, Dennis (1992). A Century of Challenge: The Story of Southern College 1892–1992. Collegedale, Tennessee: The Board of Trustees, Southern College of Seventh-day Adventists. ISBN 0-9634258-0-3.
- Reiber, Milton T. (1989). Graysville: 1888-1988, Battle Creek of the South. Collegedale, Tennessee: The College Press.
- Reiber, Milton T. (April 13, 1995). "The Battle Creek of the South" (PDF). Adventist Review. 172 (15). Hagerstown, Maryland: Review and Herald Publishing Association: 17–19. ISSN 0161-1119.
- Seventh-day Adventist Yearbook for 1893 (PDF). Battle Creek, Michigan: General Conference of Seventh-day Adventists. 1893. p. 66. Archived from the original (PDF) on 2012-04-05.
- "SMC to change name" (PDF). Adventist Review. 159 (21). Takoma Park, Washington, D.C.: Review and Herald Publishing Association: 23. May 27, 1982. ISSN 0161-1119.
- Spalding, Arthur Whitefield (1949). Captains of the Host (PDF). Washington, D.C.: Review and Herald Publishing Association. Archived from the original (PDF) on 2012-01-19.
- Wilcox, Francis M. (November 25, 1902). "Obituaries: Colcord" (PDF). Review and Herald. 79 (47). Battle Creek, Michigan: Seventh-day Adventist Publishing Association: 23.
- Wood, Lynn H. (January 26, 1920). "President's Report of the Southern Junior College: Given at the Southern and Southeastern Union Conference Meetings, January 30 to Feb. 3, 1920" (PDF). Southern Union Worker. XIV (10). Ooltewah, Tennessee: Southern Union Conference of Seventh-day Adventists: 1–5.
