= WSMC-FM =

Classical music radio station in Collegedale–Chattanooga, Tennessee

- Collegedale, Tennessee; United States
- Broadcast area: Chattanooga metropolitan area
- Frequency: 90.5 MHz
- Branding: Classical 90.5 WSMC

Programming
- Format: Classical music
- Affiliations: NPR; PRX; APM; Classical 24

Ownership
- Owner: Southern Adventist University

History
- First air date: November 1961
- Call sign meaning: Southern Missionary College (former name of SAU)

Technical information
- Licensing authority: FCC
- Facility ID: 61269
- Class: C
- ERP: 100,000 watts
- HAAT: 314 meters (1,030 ft)
- Transmitter coordinates: 35°15′20″N 85°13′34″W

Links
- Public license information: Public file; LMS
- Webcast: Listen Live
- Website: wsmc.org

WSMC-FM (90.5 FM) is a non-commercial radio station licensed to Collegedale, Tennessee, United States, and serving the Chattanooga metropolitan area. Owned by Southern Adventist University (SAU), it features a classical music format that is student-run, with Christian radio programming airing Friday evening through Saturday afternoon (in accord with the Adventist Sabbath).

WSMC-FM's studios are located on the right side of the Academic Technology building on the campus of Southern Adventist University on Colcord Drive in Collegedale, and its transmitter is located on Mowbray Mountain, off Montlake Road in Soddy-Daisy. The signal can be heard in parts of Tennessee, Georgia, Alabama and North Carolina. Programming can also be heard on low-power FM translator W217AW at 91.3 MHz in Dalton, Georgia.

== History ==
=== Early years ===
WSMC-FM first signed on the air in November 1961. Originally on 88.1 FM, it moved to 90.7 in 1967 and to 90.3 in 1990. For years, its signal was spotty at best in downtown Chattanooga. However, in 1990, it moved from its original tower on White Oak Mountain to a new tower on Mowbray Mountain in Soddy-Daisy, allowing it better coverage of the Chattanooga radio market.

The call sign stands for Southern Missionary College, SAU's name at the time the station began operations. From its earliest days, the station has broadcast a mix of classical music and Adventist religious music and teachings.

=== Adventist restrictions ===
In 1971, WSMC became one of the charter members of NPR. However, because of the religious doctrine of the licensee's church body, the General Conference of Seventh-day Adventists, WSMC cannot air live news programming from sunset on Friday evening until sunset on Saturday evening. This frequently resulted in NPR's afternoon drive time program, All Things Considered, being interrupted while in progress. This situation did not sit well with NPR during the 1990s.

Coinciding with this dispute, a citizens' group called "Chattanoogans for Better Public Radio" took exception to what group organizer Bob Steverson described as the "awkward marriage of convenience" between WSMC and NPR. Most of NPR's funding comes from the Corporation for Public Broadcasting, partially subsidized by Federal appropriations. From sunset on Friday evening to sunset on Saturday evening, WSMC aired a variety of local and national religious programs.

The groups complained that it was inappropriate for WSMC to receive federal funding, since it aired more religious programming each week than could be considered a public service. Some individuals also alleged that the religious programming, mandated by the administration of what was then Southern College of Seventh-day Adventists, amounted to catering to a religious minority at the expense of the larger public in the Tennessee Valley. In March 1995, WSMC formed a community advisory board to address these concerns.

However, as Steverson's group saw it, Southern College had three options: stop preempting NPR programming, move NPR programming to WUTC 88.1 FM, the area's other NPR member station, or give up WSMC's license to another owner. In June 1995, NPR officials began the process of terminating WSMC's membership on the grounds that the station preempted NPR programming too often and aired too much religious programming. In response, college officials and station management decided to take action themselves, discontinuing most NPR programming, news included, taking effect on September 30, 1995. Most moved to WUTC, which replaced WSMC as the Chattanooga market's primary NPR station. (WUTC is owned by the University of Tennessee at Chattanooga.) Replacing ATC were Public Radio International's The World and American Public Media's Marketplace, which could air on a delayed basis or be preempted on Fridays.

By the mid-2000s, all long-form spoken word programming had disappeared from the schedule. A few NPR music programs and news briefs remain on WSMC's schedule (purchased separately without a network discount).

== Programming ==
WSMC's programming consists entirely of classical music and derived genres. The playlist is less diverse than a typical classical public radio station, targeting an older, more conservative listenership. By contrast, 88.1 WUTC carries mostly news and talk programs furnished by NPR and other public radio suppliers with jazz heard nights and weekends.

On weekends, some national classical shows from NPR and other public radio sources include Performance Today, From the Top, With Heart and Voice, Pipedreams and Sunday Baroque. Weeknights and Sundays, programming is supplied by "Classical 24," a national classical network for public radio stations.

Inspirational classical music and Christian radio shows are heard on Friday evenings and nights, as well as in the daytime on Saturdays (the 24-hour period of observance for Seventh-day Adventists).

== See also ==
- Media ministries of the Seventh-day Adventist Church

== Notes ==
- 1995 report on listener dissatisfaction over religious programming on WSMC
- Report on WSMC's discontinuing full membership in NPR
