= Shimian Maifu =

Shimian Maifu (Chinese: 十面埋伏) may refer to:

- Ambush from Ten Sides, a traditional Chinese music piece written for the pipa
- The Hegemon-King Bids His Concubine Farewell, a traditional Chinese opera, known as Shimian Maifu in some regional opera forms
- House of Flying Daggers, a 2004 Chinese film by Zhang Yimou

== See also ==
- Battle of Gaixia fought between Liu Bang (Han) and Xiang Yu (Chu) in 202 BC, from which this term derives
