= Djang San =

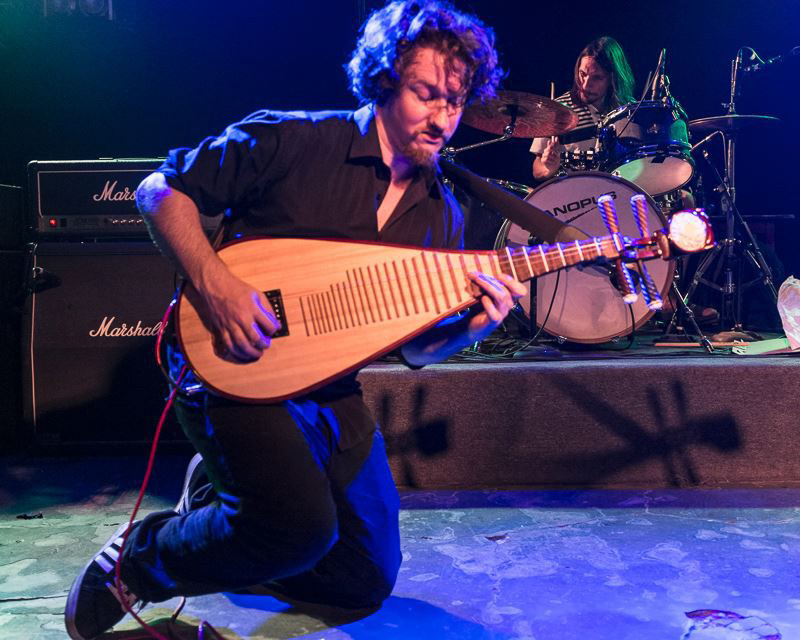

Background information
- Also known as: Djang San; Zhang Si'an
- Born: Jean-Sébastien Héry; 1980 (age 45–46); Bordeaux, France
- Genres: Folk; Rock; Alternative electronic; French electro; World music
- Occupations: Singer; Songwriter; Musician; Composer
- Instruments: Vocals; Electric guitare; Folk guitare; Electric zhongruan; Electric pipa; keyboards; Piano
- Years active: 2001–present
- Label: Self-released
- Website: djangsan.bandcamp.com

Djang San (born Jean-Sébastien Héry in 1980 in Bordeaux, France; also known as Zhang Si'an) is a French musician, singer, songwriter, and composer. He has spent most of his creative life in Asia and has released more than 60 albums. In search for new sounds, he was one of the first to use the Zhonguran, guzheng and Pipa, ancient Chinese instruments, in electro and rock composition and on stage. He was the first foreigner to write songs in Chinese and to sing those songs to a Chinese audience in China. He sings in English, French, and Chinese. He has also created the first electric versions of Chinese instruments Pipa, Guzheng and Zhongruan, which he uses on stage.

His extended use of these three electrified classical Chinese instruments in modern music has inspired artists such as Nini (Hsiao Yi Ting) (Taiwan), Xiao He (Beijing), and Martin Feng (Beijing). He is seen as a pioneering act for these instruments.

== Biography ==
=== Early Times ===
Born in 1980 in Bordeaux, France, Djang San spent his early childhood in South America (1980–1986, Lima, Peru). In 1987 he went back to Bordeaux and started learning violin. Inspired by the eclectic music records available at his home, he started playing guitar and writing songs with friends in a music band called Soda, which will later become Blue Karma, during high-school.

=== Encounter with China ===
Djang San went to Beijing for the first time in year 2000. It is around that time that Djang San met with most of Beijing's underground music bands and artists of the time and got influenced by their music: Wild Children, Second Hand Roses, Buyi, Cold Blooded Animal, Wang Juan, Wan Xiaoli, Brain Failure, Dou Wei, Song Yuzhe etc.

In 2001, he decided to stay in Beijing for a year and was playing every Wednesday night at the "River bar", at the time, one of the center of the Beijing underground music and art. The bar closed in 2003.

Travelling frequently in China (Beijing, Shanghai, Lanzhou, Xinjiang....) and Taiwan from 2000 to 2004, he experimented with all kinds of music including folk, rock, electro.

=== First albums ===
Back to France in 2003, he recorded his first album in Chinese, "Lotus". This album is inspired by a trip with the members of the band Wild Children and Mutuigua band leader Song Yuzhe to Lanzhou city. Together, they climbed the Lotus mountain (Lianhuashan), located in the south of Gansu province in order to listen to the songs of a local ethnic minority. The album includes a remix of the Lianhuashan songs, as well as a tune that Djang San composed with a Xinjiang instrument called Rivapu.

In his next albums, "Is it China" and "Naixin", Djang San used ancient Chinese poetry and mixed it with music coming from his own imagination. For example, the songs "Tianjing Sha Qiu Si" (Naixin) and "Jianlou house" (Is it China) are based on ancient Chinese poems."Tianjing Sha Qiu Si" was written during the Yuan dynasty by poet Ma Zhiyuan, "Jianlou House" corresponds to the poem "Lou Shi Ming", written during the Tang dynasty by poet Liu Yuxi. Djang San was also one of the first musicians to use ancient Chinese poems in music, the idea being to re-give a life to some poems originally written for music but for which the musical parts have been lost.

The idea of the album "Is it China" was to create a mix between ancient Chinese music and culture and modern Western music by using Chinese music instruments such as Zhongruan or Hulusi (葫芦丝) as well as traditional rock instruments such as guitar, bass, and drums. On that album (and for most songs he wrote), Djang San has recorded all the instruments himself. On some of the songs, singer Liu Hong joined him. Djang San was probably the first foreigner in China to write songs using a Zhongruan

The next album, "Naixin", more acoustic, was mainly a series of songs composed on guitar and zhongruan. The album followed the same idea as "Is it China", with stronger influence from Blues and Electro music.

In 2006, artist Chen Zhuo asked him to write music for her sculptures exhibition "Born in the 80's" which took place in Tianjin the same year. These music recordings will lead to the release of the EP "Rêves d'enfance".

=== Back to China ===
In 2006, as he came back to live in Beijing, Djang San met with Ghanaian percussionist Sunny Dee and Benny Oyama, young American guitar player from New York. Together they created "The Incredible JSB!", in order to create a mix of musical styles ranging from Jazz to Rock, Bossa Nova, Reggae, and Chinese Folk.

Between 2006 and 2010, the band released one studio album "Mad in China" and two live albums.

Under the influence of Benny Oyama, Djang San started studying jazz standards and music theory in harmony. In 2009, Benny Oyama went back to New York and "The Incredible JSB!" adventure ended.

In search of new ways to go back to his rock and roll music roots, Djang San formed a new band, "The Amazing Insurance Salesmen" (AIS) and started playing some of his old rock songs with the band.

In 2010, "The Amazing Insurance Salesmen" won the "Global Battle of the Bands (GBOB)" in Beijing and Hong Kong against 84 other bands. The band participated in 2011 to the world final of the GBOB where 18 countries competed, but didn't win.

Still in 2010, while writing songs and developing the sound of The AIS, Djang San recorded a new album "Mandarin(e) Jazz". The album is a mix of jazz, world music, rock and experimental music. In this album, Djang San recorded two jazz standards, "Summertime" and "Take the A Train" using the Zhongruan, a Chinese folk instrument used in Chinese opera. It is the first time that instrument is ever used in that way, using the technique of the walking bass onto it.

A live album would follow, "Live in Jiangsu", recorded with his old friend Mathieu Wahiche on solo guitar.

The same year, Djang San released an EP, "Uranus", which gathered a few songs recorded between 2006 and 2011.

=== Djang San ===
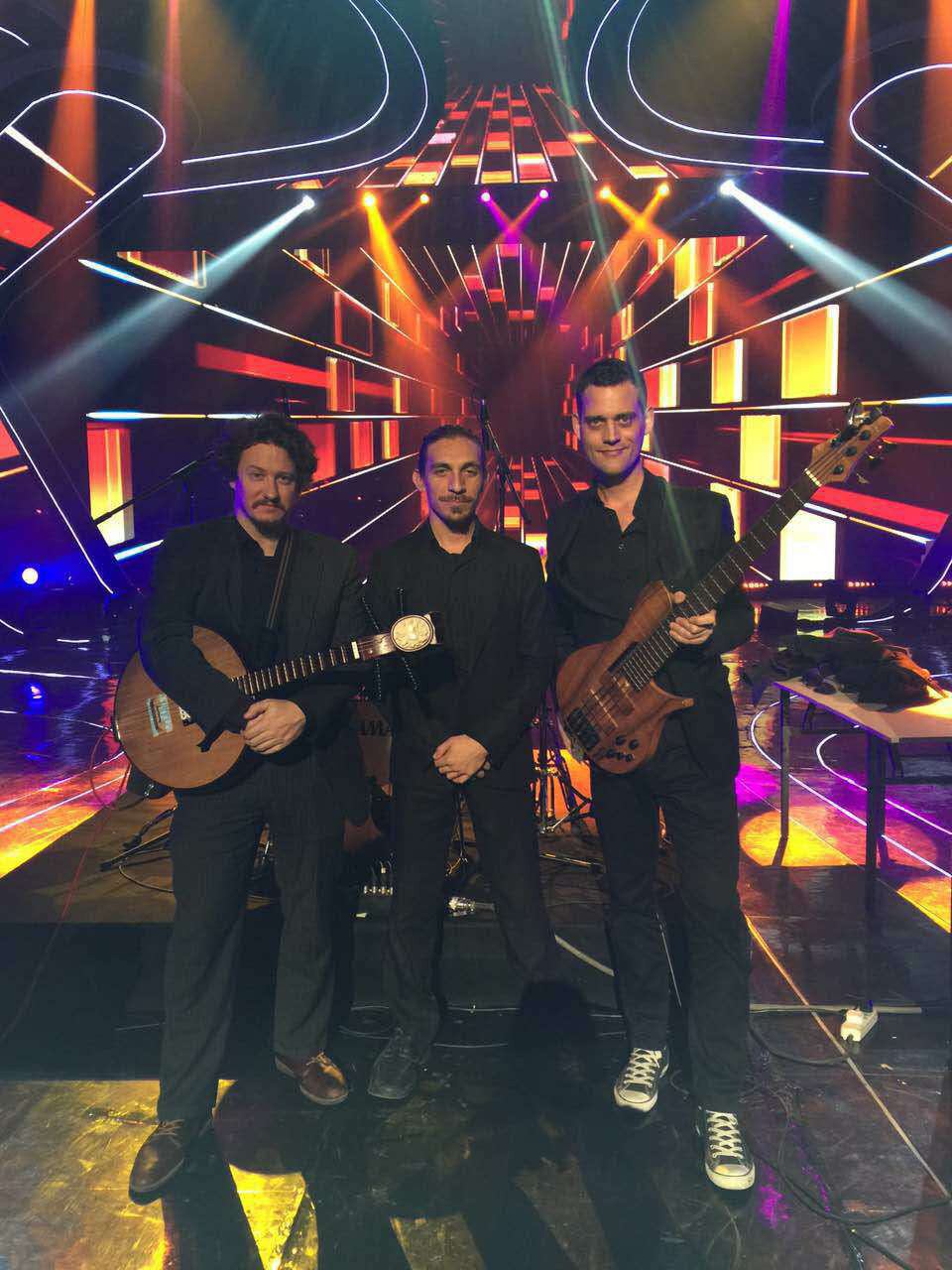
Djang San and Band on air CCTV3 2015.jpg

In 2011, after touring with The AIS, Djang San decided to change his name to Djang San (he was using Zhang Si'an before), and started experimenting with electronic equipment, samplers and keyboards.

Between July 2011 and January 2012, Djang San recorded three live performances in Beijing and released them under the name "One man live orchestra Volume 1 to 3". This was a new path for Djang San at the time, who now can play three different sets of music, one experimental, one folk, one electronic, sometimes mixing the different ideas all at once

Dang San, as solo performer is playing several instruments including guitar, zhongruan, hulusi (flute), keyboard, drum machine during his sets.

In 2013, Djang San created "Djang San + Band" around Djang San's own electrified version of the Zhongruan. By doing so, Djang San created a new present and future for this forgotten instrument and gave it a new sound and a new direction with albums such as "Tofu électrique" and "Bridges".

In 2014, Djang San creates the electric pipa and starts recording albums with it, the first to be recorded is "Experimental Electric Pipa", most of his albums since this one all include one or more electric pipa tracks.

From 2015 the band becomes more international with tours in Korea, Japan, Taiwan, and across mainland China. The band also starts participating in more and more festivals such as the Strawberry, Zandari Festa, Seoul Music Week, Hokkaido WMDF, Tiger Ramble Outdoors Music Festival in Taiwan, the Zhujiajiao World Music Festival, the Shanghai WMF, etc.

He continues recording as a band and solo with albums such as "What You Want', "The fog in our hearts", "Eye" and many more, releasing an average of 4 albums a year

In 2018, Djang San releases "Tofu Electrique" in Japanon CD to Tower Record stores and tours the country to promote the CD.

In 2019, Djang San creates a sequel to "The Amazing Insurance Salesmen" under the name "Bob Dupont & The Outstanding Vegan Bankers" as a sarcastic reminder of the original band name and releases "Dolphin Sandwich".

In 2019 Djang San is invited to tour Taïwan and creates music with kids of minorities living in the poverty stricken areas around Hualien.

Djang San also composed and recorded music for films and has, so far, recorded more than 50 albums. He plays in numerous concerts and festivals around China and Asia.

He has been interviewed countless times and had documentaries done about him on Chinese TV and Radio stations. He is regularly interviewed about the Chinese music scene by Western Newspapers and magazines ("Liberation" "L'Express" etc.).

=== A Theory of Intelligence and other projects ===
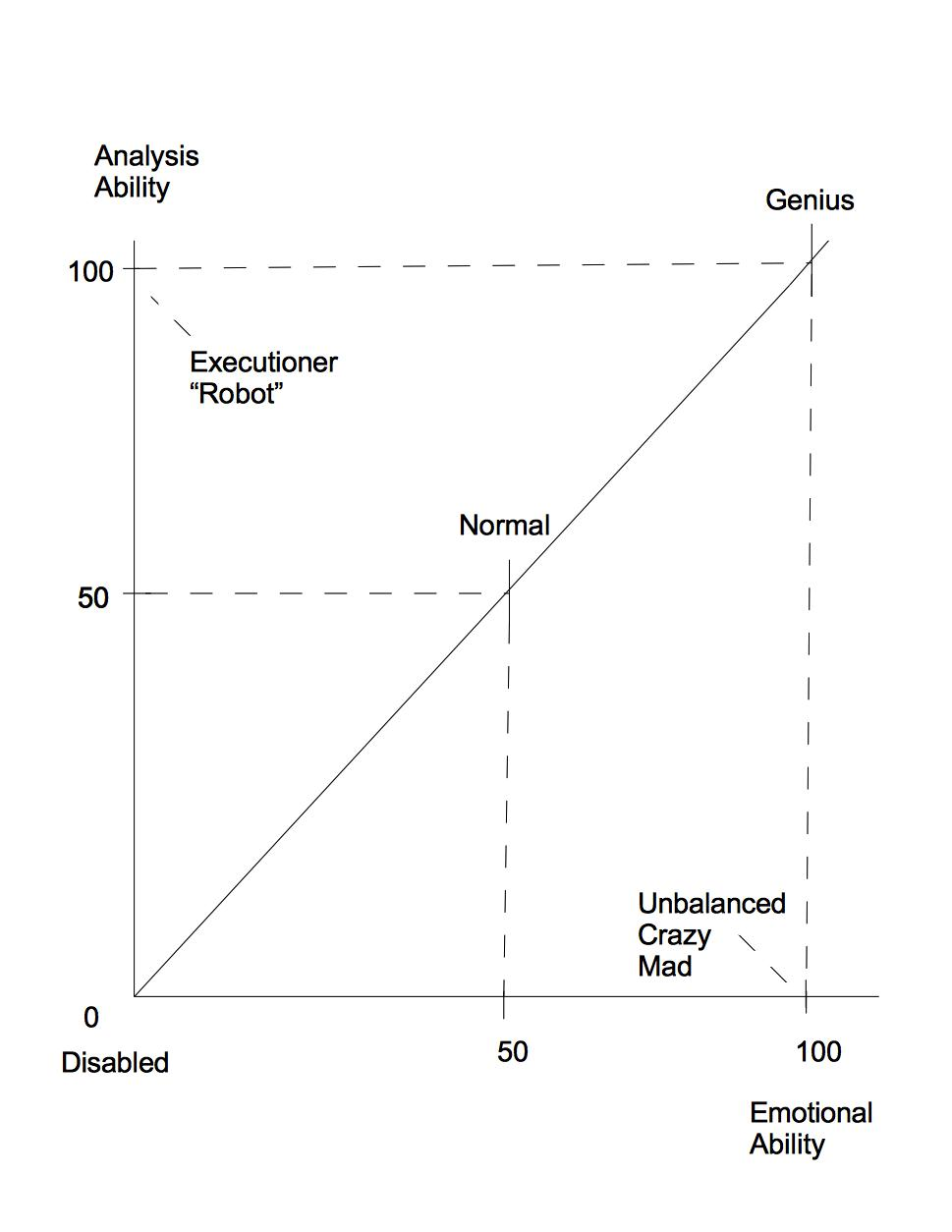
A theory of intelligence Djang San theory graphic

In 2014 Djang San released an album called "A theory of intelligence" in an effort to express an idea he drew on his phone while on a night train from Beijing to Kunming. The album is based on a graphic describing Djang San's theory, the music is made to accompany the theory.

As a musical experimenter Djang San doesn't stop developing ideas and experimenting with music styles and musical concepts. His ability to experiment is clearly seen in albums such as "8 Bit Boy", an album trying to recreate an 80's NES game that never existed, "Elevator Music for Shampoo Commercials", an album using 1950's commercials as a background for a critic of consumption society, "Mini Symphony in Smog Major", a reflection on Beijing smog through classical music, "Beijing Frogs of the Night", a collaboration with bassist Clancy Lethbridge using field recordings, "Cigarettes, Bricks, Dust, Alcohol", an album about loneliness in Beijing during the destruction and bricking of the city's popular hutong areas, "The Goat who Fell from Earth", the story of a goat drifting through space and fighting interstellar injustice, a story created by Djang San, 2400 Meters High Improvised Music Session - 2400 米高即兴音乐录音, an album improvised in one afternoon in a studio in Lijiang, Yunnan with Djang San playing all instruments except for keyboard played by David Bond.

As a multi-instrumentalist, Djang San plays most instruments on his albums as he can play guitar, zhongruan, pipa, hulusi, bass, drums, a little bit of keyboard, and a variety of other instruments.

=== The Beijing Underground ===
In 2013 Djang San creates the Beijing Underground group on Facebook in order to give more exposure to the Chinese underground music scene. The group quickly becomes the biggest group on Facebook for underground music in China with more than 20 000 members. With the success of the Facebook group Djang San quickly creates a website dedicated to interviews of the Chinese and Asian underground artists and to concerts, showcases and festivals he organizes in Beijing under the Beijing Underground Banner.

== Discography ==
=== Djang San + Band albums ===
- About a dream - 梦梦中 (2019)
- Suputa Masala - 一起跳舞 (2019)
- Straight Lines and Circles - 直线和圆圈 (2019)
- What You Want 你想要的 (2017)
- Eye.爱.Ai.I (2) (2016)
- Eye.爱.Ai.I (1) (2016)
- Bridges (part 2) 桥 (第二部分) (2015）
- Bridges (part 1) 桥 (第一部分) (2015）
- (A)live in Korea (2015)
- Tofu Electrique 电豆腐 (2014)
- Djang San + Band (Live in Beijing) (2013)

=== Djang San albums ===
- Supermarket Music for Chinese Factories - 为中国工厂谱曲的超市音乐 (2019)
- Natural Music · Jue Shi Music 19/1/16: No1 - 自然音乐·觉士乐19/1/16 : No1 (2019)
- Mask Music - 面具音乐 (2018)
- 2400 Meters High Improvised Music Session - 2400 米高即兴音乐录音 (2018)
- Walk - 步行 (2018)
- Upside Down Music - 上下颠倒音乐 (2018)
- Red Lips 紅唇 (2017)
- Cigarettes 烟, Dust 灰, Bricks 砖, Alcohol 酒 (2017)
- The Fog in Our Hearts (2017)
- Mini Symphony in Smog Major (2016)
- I love cigars (2016)
- Beijing Frogs of the night (2016)
- 8 Bit Boy (2015)
- Experimental Electric Pipa 试验电琵琶 (2015）
- Dreams of Blue Ocean (2015)
- Music Dumplings 音乐饺子 (2014)
- Love is a detention center for lonely people (2014)
- Zhongruan Vol.2 中阮第二集 (2014)
- A Theory of Intelligence (2014)
- Elevator music for shampoo commercials (2014)
- Folk songs no one will listen to (2014)
- Robot 机器人 (2013)
- Electronic Music For Chinese Restaurants (2013)
- Just a little bit of Jazz (2013)
- Zhong Ruan – 中阮 (2013)
- This is Nonsense (2013)
- One Man Live Orchestra Vol4 (2013)
- One Man Live Orchestra Vol3 (2012)
- One Man Live Orchestra Vol2 (2011)
- One Man Live Orchestra Vol1 (2011)
- Live in Jianghu (江湖酒吧演唱会) (2010)
- Mandarin(e) Jazz (普通话爵士) (2010)
- Uranus (天王星) (2010)
- Naixin (耐心) (Patience) (2007)
- Rêves d'enfance (童年的梦想) (2006)
- Is it China ? (这是瓷器吗) (2004)
- Lotus (莲花) (2003)

=== Djang San + Octavio ===
- The Goat Who Fell From Earth (2015)

=== The Amazing Insurance Salesmen 保险超人 albums ===
- Escape 逃走 (2011)

=== The Incredible JSB ! ===
- Mad in China (2008)
- Live in Beijing 2 (2008)
- Live in Beijing 1 (2007)

=== Bob Dupont & The Outstanding Vegan Bankers ===
- Dancing to the voice of a dead man (2019)
- Dolphin Sandwich (2019)

=== Bob Dupont ===
- The Man With No Face (2015)
- Camembert Politique (2014)

=== Sardine is Back and the Wheel is Broken (as a drummer) ===
- If I Only Saw It There (2018)
- Cheese Please ! (2017)
- Chickens are Screaming Cardboard Recordings from the Belly of a Mall (2016)

== Band members ==
=== Djang San + Band ===
- Djang San – vocals, electric guitar, electric pipa
- Stefano Latorre – bass
- Carlo V. Fuentes – drums
- Clancy Lethbridge – bass
- Nicolas Mège – drums
- Philippe Mège – bass
- Hugo Radyn - drums

=== Dang San + Octavio ===
- Djang San – vocals, electric guitar
- Christopher O'Young (Octavio) – bass, arrangements, voice, keyboard

=== The Amazing Insurance Salesmen ===
- Djang San – vocals, electric guitar
- Maikel Liem – bass
- Mao Mao (Zhang Qiang) – drums

=== The Incredible JSB ! ===
- Djang San – vocals, electric guitar
- Sunny Dee – percussions
- Benny Oyama – guitar

=== Bob Dupont & The Outstanding Vegan Bankers ===
- Djang San (Bob Dupont) - guitar and vocals
- Maikel Liem - bass
- Hugo Radyn - drums
- Nicolas Mège - drums

=== Bob Dupont ===
- Djang San (Bob Dupont) - everything

=== Sardine is Back and the Wheel is Broken (as a drummer) ===
- Nathan Broflofka - guitar/voice
- Djang San (Dr Bob) - drums
- Jukka Ahonnen - bass
- Christopher O'Young - bass
- Clancy Lethbridge - bass
