= Yang Jing (composer) =

Chinese-born Swiss musical artist

Yang Jing 楊靜
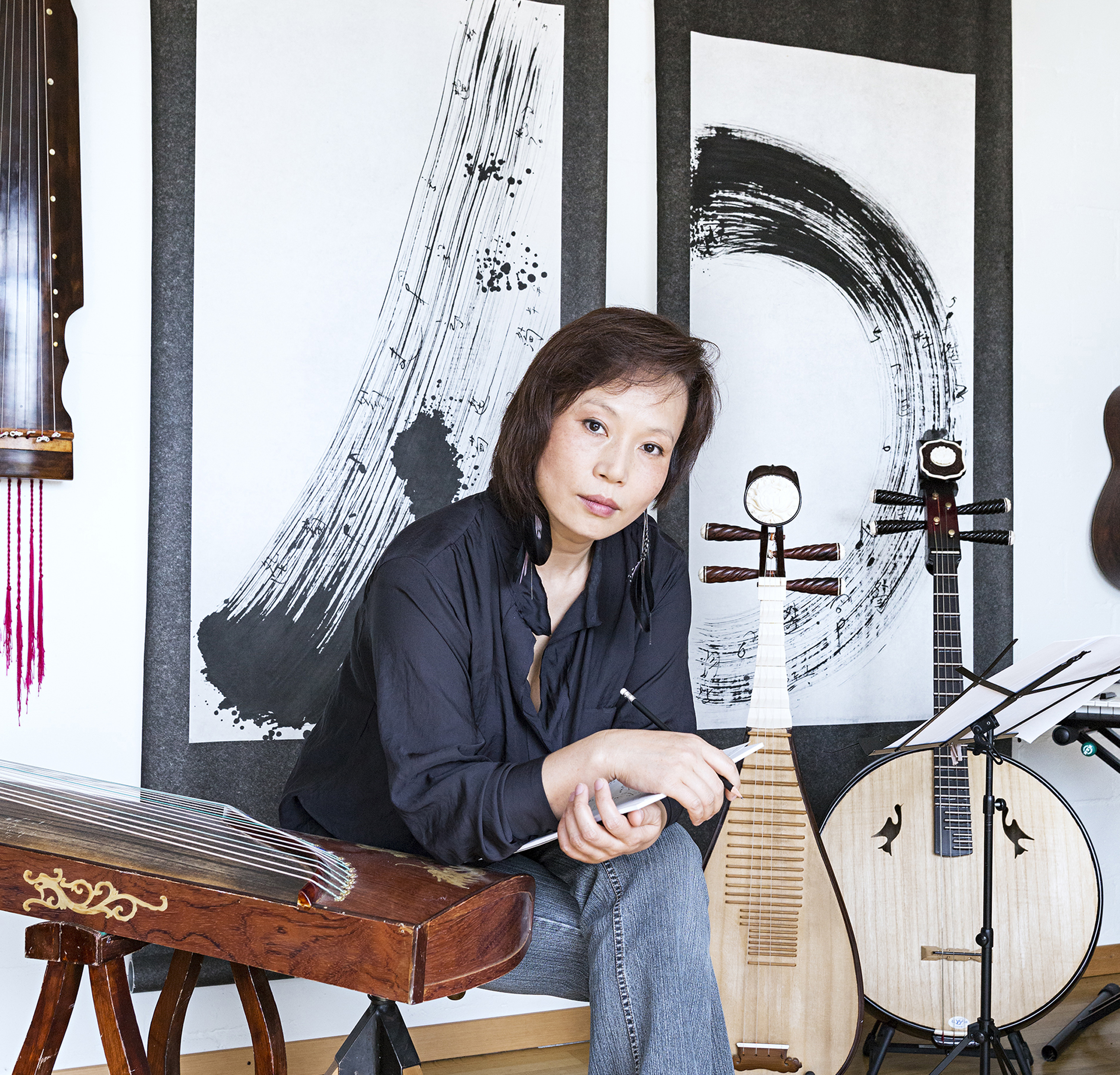
- Yang Jing

Background information
- Occupations: Composer, concert Pipa soloist & Bandleader

Yang Jing (Chinese: 楊靜; pinyin: Yáng Jìng; born Dec.1963) is a composer based in central Switzerland, a legendary concert pipa soloist and Bandleader.

== Early life and education ==
Yang was born in Anyang in Henan province, China. According to Yang, she came from an educated family that was regarded with suspicion during the Cultural Revolution. Her mother worked in a hospital, and her father was an army officer. Her grandfather died in prison after being accused of counterrevolution.

She started playing the pipa, the Chinese plucked lute, at the age of six. From 1976, at the age of 12, she started performing in an ensemble at the Henan Opera music Theater.

From the age of 18, Yang studied at the Shanghai Conservatory of Music, and graduated in 1986. In 1997, she went to Japan to study with composer Minoru Miki, as she started to explore contemporary music, and later performed and recorded pipa concertos by Miki with Japanese orchestras. She worked with Japanese traditional instrumental soloists. In 2003, she moved with her family to Switzerland and completed a Master's degree in Contemporary music Composition and Theory, as well as Jazz music at the Hochschule der Künste Bern 10 years later.

== Career ==
Yang worked in the Henan Opera Theater in 1977. After graduating from Shanghai Conservatory became a pipa soloist with the China National Traditional Orchestra in 1986.

In 1986 her works for solo Pipa «Nine Jade Chains» Jiǔ lián yù (composed in 1983) and «Disclosure» (composed in 1984) both won the composition prize at the Shanghai Spring Festival. Yang, herself won the prize for the best solo performance on the pipa. In the same year, her works became part of the teaching program for Concert Pipa Solo performance Majors at Shanghai Music Conservatory and Central Music Conservatory of China.

From 1986 to 1998, during performing as pipa soloist with the Orchestra in Beijing, Yang Jing devoted herself increasingly to composition and initiated commissioned works for the first all-female Chinese traditional instrumental quartet, QMJY. In the late 1990s, the ensemble was invited to perform at festivals in Germany and Hong Kong, marking its emergence on the international stage.

In 1996, Yang Jing became the first artist invited by the Beijing Concert Hall to present a pipa solo concert featuring her own compositions. Within the context of a newly market-oriented management system, this innovative concert format was recorded and broadcast live by China Central Television (CCTV).

In 1997, she began touring internationally with her own works for solo concert pipa. In the same year, she premiered Minoru Miki's Pipa Concerto with Orchestra Asia, and subsequently performed it with the Tokyo Metropolitan Symphony Orchestra in Japan and Seoul, Korea. She also gave the premieres of Mo Fan's Pipa Concerto "Ballad of the Eternal Sorrow" in Japan and the United States. She invited the Norway Musician Steinar Ofsdal's group for concerts in Beijing.

In 1998 Yang began her collaboration with Pierre Favre, a Swiss percussionist. Since 2000, they started a seven years intensive concert activities co-operations, toured in China and Europe, with live CD & DVD recording: Moments. In 1998, together with the Swiss pianist Arthur Mattli, Yang released the charity album Village in the Floods, music for pipa and piano in collaboration with Red-cross association. Her Pipa solo concert in London, United Kingdom, received praise for its "Heifetz-like quality." (Sunday Telegraph)

In 1999, she was invited to reopen a local cultural centre in Shropshire, United Kingdom, named after her: YANG JING. On this occasion, she also presented her solo recital Eastern Spirit.

Between 1998 and 2010, extensive tours across Japan, the United States, and Europe formed the core of her international artistic activity. Such as: 2000 Pipa and Guqin joined Opera Miki Minoru «The Tale of Genji» product and premiere at Stifel Theatre St. Louis, MO, USA; Tour with jazz legends Arnie Lawrence Saxophone and Max Roach Drum in China and Israel; In 2002, the 'Yang Jing & Yui Ensemble' won the prize at the International Chamber Music Competition in Osaka, Japan.

From 2005 she started the annual Music Festival «Hokuto International Music Festival» in Japan, as the international artists' director. From 1998 she started Annual Japan Tour with Minoru Miki's «Asia Silk Road Ensemble», as part of the regular «Asia Ensemble» activities. She also served as a guest professor at music academies across Europe, Asia and United States. In Switzerland, she did music for Pipa & Organ Project with Organist Wolfgang Sieber, CD & DVD «Yang Jing and Wolfgang Sieber: Pipa & Pipes CD «Dance on a Bridge» She concert toured with the 'Chamber soloists Lucerne' in Europe, China, India, and Japan and together with the composer Daniel Schnyder himself, did the US premiere of Pipa Concerto 'Mozart In China' .

In 2006 in Opera «To Die for Love» premiere, New National Theater Tokyo, Japan, which featured Yang's pipa solo, not only as the musical character, but the Role played on the centre of stage. With the «Swiss Jazz Quintet» appeared her at Shanghai Jazz Festival; She started tours with Swiss Jazz Group 4tett Different Song in China and Switzerland.

In 2007, Premiere concerts of her East & West Ensemble In 2009–2010 in Opera Production «To Die for Love», Heidelberger Opernzelt, Deutschland.

In 2010, Her 'Ensemble New Elements' toured with the innovative new composition programs In 2012, her music in Jazz formations, CD 'No. 9' & CD 'Steps into the Future' with 4tett Different Song. In 2014, she directed an eleven-piece jazz ensemble in concert featuring her own Jazz compositions (including 'A letter to Mingus'), with the premiere taking place at the Kultur und Kongresshaus Aarau (KKA), Switzerland

Since settling in the central Swiss Alps, Yang Jing has entered a particularly fertile creative period, developing new concert season projects, each carefully tailored to the specific artistic concept of individual performances. She work integrates Asian and European instruments, multiple spoken languages, and a wide range of musical styles, including classical, Jazz, contemporary music, multimedia forms, and Improvisation, performed in various chamber formations, as well as in choir, solo, and cross disciplinary settings. Rather than focusing on single compositions alone, she often designs entire concert programs as unified artistic narratives. For example, works for Modern Ensemble: «Erzählungen vom Fluss»; chamber music concert program: «Singing Strings – Identity»; Quintet «Der Grosse Wagen» in Fünf Sätzen; Concert: «Unter einem hellen Sternenhimmel», music for Choirs, Electro- Multimedia and live acoustic concert «Klingende Zeit»; chamber opera: «Mein Kind soll frei atmen».

== Y-Pipa ==
Together with Swiss guitar instrument repair master, she developed in 2024 a new type of pipa - the Y-pipa —that not only maintains the traditional style of the pipa but also provides more possibilities for its composers, performers, and concert organisers.

== Publications (Sheet Music Books) ==
2009 Yang Jing Music For Pipa: Sheet Music For Pipa With Explanations Of The Playing Technique Marks Switzerland /2023 Second edition, Germany

2023 YANG Jing Music for Pipa and String Quartet, a series of sheet music score books: 'Singing Strings - Identity' / Y Music Switzerland Edition

2024 Yang Jing works for concert Pipa - and Score and Sound' People's Music Publishing House, Digital Edition

2025 'Sheet Music for Chamber Ensembles'

1994 Composition «Qiu Ci Wu Qu» People's publishing House, Beijing

2025 'Yang Jing works for orchestra, sheet music Books'

== Notable compositions ==
Yang Jing's oeuvre spans solo, chamber, choral, symphonic, multimedia, and cross-genre formats. Works include:

=== Orchestra work and concertos ===
- Pipa Concerto Three Dance Movements (Pipa mit Symphonieorchester)
- Totentanz - Cello Concerto
- Lumina (orgel, Kammerensemble und Chor)
- Verborgenes Gesicht des Mondes (Pipa und Chor)
- Echoes of the Earth (Orchester)
- Feuer - Erde(Pipa und Orchester)

=== Music for duo and solo ===
Music for Piano/Organ and Pipa

- Alpentagebuch: Sieben Szenen
- Memory in Moon Shadow
- Weihnachtsbaumschmuck
- A Flowing Spring, A Roman Fountain
- Pipa and Pipes - Konzert für Pipa und Pfeifenorgel mit verschiedenen Stücken
- Feuerreiter

=== Music featuring flute ===
- Einst im Pavilion- in three moments
- Flying flowers on Meadow
- Jade Flute in Spring Night

=== Music for Solo Pipa ===
- Severed Dream of Dunhuang
- Blessing Sparks
- Geysers
- Dance along the old Silk Road
- Die bewegte Stille
- Disclosures
- Peter's Easter Flowers
- Sacred Water
- Pipa Suite: Four Movements: Fā → Chéng → Huí → Hé (Rising- Flowing- Circling und Blending)
- Berg und Fluss

=== Chamber music featuring string quartet and trio ===
- Ein neuer Anfang
- Identity
- Morning Song & Evening Poem
- Singing Strings – Heart Swing
- The Silk Pipa Dance
- Jade in Strings
- String Trio 0-1-2-3
- Black Horse
- Silk Bamboo Strings
- A Shanxiner im Muotathal
- Sunset Over Northern Heights

=== Vocal and chamber music ===
- Erzählungen vom Fluss - ein Konzert für Sextett und das Nichts in neun Sätzen
- Unter einem hellen Sternenhimmel – ein Konzert für gemischtes Ensemble mit verschiedenen Stücken
- Himmlischer Fluss - Vokal- und Kammerensemble
- Im Blütengarten – ein Konzert für Stimme, Pipa & Cello mit verschiedenen Stücken
- Lied der Aare
- Sozusagen grundlos vergnügt
- One Tone• Two Lands – Instrumental Trio Konzert
- Der Grosse Wagen - Kammermusik mit Gesang
- A Night in Liangzhou - Kammermusik mit Gesang

=== Opera and theater ===
- Mein Kind soll frei atmen – Musiktheater für Solostimme
- Henzi-Verschwörung – Musiktheater für drei Sängerinnen
- Drache und Ameise - Musik und Theate

=== Multimedia concerts ===
- Klingende Zeit – Pipa-Konzert mit Multimedia (in neun Sätzen, ca. 75')
- Symphonie auf vier Saiten – Pipa-Konzert mit Multimedia (in sieben Sätzen)
- Tales of Pipa, Zeit und Raum der Pipa (Multimedia-Konzerte)

=== Jazz and crossover ===
- A Letter to Mingus (Jazz-Ensemble)
- Yellow in Green (Jazz-Ensemble)
- Farewell to an old Friend (Jazz-Quartett)
- Step into the Future (Jazz-Quartett)

== Discography ==
- «Singing Strings – Identity» 2023 Yang Jing Music for String Quartet and Pipa Played by Yang Jing & Festival Strings Lucerne Chamber Players Neos CD
- «Peter's Easter Flower» 2023 Yang Jing Music for Pipa Y Music CD
- «Pipa Concerto – Mozart In China» 2023 Music for Pipa with orchestras written by Daniel Schnyder, Minoru Miki, Mo Fan Y Music CD
- «Jade Flute In Spring Night» 2023 Music for Trio Concert Y Music CD
- «Pipa Moment» 2023 YANG Jing Music for Pipa and classical Guitar Trio Y Music CD
- «Severed Dream of Dunhuang» Mèng duàn dūnhuáng 2023 Classical Pipa Music of Yang Jing Y Music CD
- «Moments II» 2023 Pierre Favre & Yang Jing 'Erzählungen 1 – 7' Y Music CD
- «A Traveller's Chant at Mount Lu» 2017, Yang Jing music for Choir and Ensembles with Calmus Ensemble; European Chinese Ensemble Klanglogo Deutschland; Naxos Records (CD)
- «Dancing on a Bridge» 2014, Yang Jing and Wolfgang Sieber; music for pipa and organ; Klanglogo Deutschland; NAXOS (CD)
- «No. 9» 2012 Yang Jing and Christy Doran; music for pipa, guqin and e-guitar; Leo Records (CD).
- «Elements» 2012, music for pipa by American composers, Albany Records (CD.
- «Transitions» 2012, Thüring Bräm music for pipa, chamber orchestra and choir, Ars Braemia (CD).
- «Step into the Future»- 4tett Different Song» 2012, Jazz 4tett: Yang Jing, Pipa/Guqin; Michel Wintsch, Piano; Baenz Oester, Bass; Norbert Pfammatter, Drums/Percussion; Leo Records(CD).
- «Live in Moscow» 2006, Yang Jing, Daniel Schnyder, Minoru Miki, Eskender Bekmambetov; music for pipa and string Orchestra(CD).
- «Two in One» 2006, Yang Jing and Pierre Favre music for pipa and percussion. InTakt Records (CD)
- «Yang Jing & the Chamber Soloists Lucerne» 2005, Tan Dun, Minoru Miki, Daniel Schnyder; music for pipa and chamber ensemble (CD and DVD)
- «Pipa and Pipes» 2005, Yang Jing and Wolfgang Sieber; music for pipa and organ. (DVD)
- «Severed Dream of Dunhuang» 2004, Yang Jing pipa music. AMC Records (CD)
- «Magic Moments» 2004, Yang Jing and Pierre Favre; music for pipa and percussion; Dingo Products (DVD)
- «Asia Ensemble» 2004, Music from Asia; Traditional Musical instruments; Tokyo, (CD)
- «Pipa Concerto» 2004, Minoru Miki; music for Pipa with Tokyo Metropolitan Symphony Orchestra; Camerata Tokyo (CD)
- «Dance along the Old Silk Road» 2003 Yang Jing; pipa music, Dragon Music HK(CD)
- «Moments» 2001, Yang Jing and Pierre Favre; music for pipa and percussion; (CD)
- «Disclosure» 1999, Yang Jing; pipa music, China Records (CD)
- «Evening Poem» 1999, Yang Jing, Yu Hongmei, Liu Yuening, and Fan Weiqing; Music for Chinese traditional instrumental quartet. China Records (CD)
- «Village in the Floods» 1998, Yang Jing and Arthur Mattli; music for pipa and piano; China Records (CD)
- «Send my passions in Red Beans» 1995, Yang Jing and Others; Music for Pipa with China National Orchestra and China Radio Orchestra (CD)
- «Butterfly Dream» 1986, Yang Jing; pipa music collection HK cassette
