= He Qiuxia =

Chinese pipa player

He Qiuxia (Chinese: 何秋霞; pinyin: Hé Qiūxiá) is a Chinese pipa player.

He Qiuxia was born in Baoji, Shaanxi, China and she studied at the Xi'an Academy of Music. After graduating, she taught at the academy and toured with the Shaanxi Music and Dance Troupe. In 1989, she went to Canada, and settled in Vancouver, British Columbia. He Qiuxia was a founding member of the cross-cultural ensemble ASZA, which she left in 2001. As well, she founded the Vancouver-based world music group, Silk Road Music. Her first recording with that group, entitled Endless, was nominated for a Juno Award. Her CD Autumn Cloud was nominated for two Canadian Folk Music Awards. The group has performed on CBC Radio 2.

He Qiuxia is married to the Montreal-born guitarist Andre Thibault. Now living in Vancouver, Thibault founded the group Jou Tou, in which He Qiuxia plays pipa and other instruments. Thibault also plays in Silk Road Music with Qiuxia. Qiuxia and Thibault often tour as a smaller version of Silk Road called the Silk Road Duo.

He Qiuxia also performs from time to time with the Brazilian guitarist Celso Machado.

In addition to the pipa, she also plays the ruan, sings, and plays percussion.

== Discography ==
- 1995 - ASZA (Asza Music)
- 1998 - Jongo Lê (with Celso Machado) (Daquí)
- 2000 - Endless (Jericho Beach)
- 2001 - Village Tales (Silk Road)
- 2002 - Jou Tou (Festival Distribution)
- 2006 - Autumn Cloud (Silk Road)

== See also ==
- Pipa
