= Ambush from Ten Sides =

Classic pipa song

"Ambush from Ten Sides" (Chinese: 十面埋伏; pinyin: shí miàn mái fú) is a classical piece written for the pipa. "Ambush" is written in the "Wu" or martial style, and is about the Battle of Gaixia in 202 B.C.E. during which General Xiang Yu was defeated by Liu Bang. This is the same subject matter as "The King Doffs His Armor" (霸王卸甲), but is written from a different perspective.

"Ambush from Ten Sides" is considered a masterpiece in Chinese classical music. The difficulty of the piece ensures that it is normally played by virtuosos.

== Theme ==
"Ambush from Ten Sides" is a Chinese classical pipa music and its subject is the decisive battle in 202 B.C.E. at Gaixia (southeast of today's Linbi County, Anhui Province) between the two armies of Chu and Han. This piece gives an overall view of the battle, while "The King Doffs His Armor" focused on Xiang Yu and his defeat. Ambush from Ten Sides provides a vivid depiction, in the form of musical narrative, of the fierce and stirring scenes of the battle and the desolate and solemn scenes of the defeated Xiang Yu, and ends with the triumph of the victor. A wide variety of performance techniques of pipa are brought into full play in this piece that produce a majestic and passionate narrative which is sharp in artistic image, exalting in melody, and ultimately thrilling.

== Origin ==
An early treatment of this theme was a piece called "Chu Han" (楚漢) from the late Ming/early Qing period, described in Sizhao Tangji (四照堂集) by Wang Youding (王猷定, 1598-1662). It was noted as a particularly outstanding virtuoso performance by Tang Yingzeng (湯應曾). This piece has identical plot and theme to "Ambush from Ten Sides", it is therefore possible that this is an early version of the work.

The actual piece of music with the title "Ambush from Ten Sides" first appeared in 1818 in the collection of lute music scores Nanbei Erpai Miben Pipapu Zhenzhuan (南北二派祕本琵琶譜真傳) compiled by Hua Qiuping from Wuxi. A number of different versions appeared later; these may vary in the number of sections but they are consistent in their musical content.

== Structure ==
"Ambush from All Sides" is in the form of multi-sectional da (large) category of traditional pipa composition. The currently popular music piece consists of a number of short sections, each with a generalized title. Different versions exist, and they may not all share the same sections.

The beginning sections of the music focus on the description of the assembled army of the Han. The music in these sections is forceful and lively, with percussive sounds on pipa imitating drums and horns. The beat of drums gets gradually faster to depict the increasingly tense atmosphere before the onset of the battle. The main part of the music is played in a rapid manner, utilising a variety of pipa techniques to describe the furious battle between the armies of Chu and Han, such as flipping, sweeping, circular fingering, wringing, rolling, and halting. The last few sections of the music depict Xiang Yu's defeat, then his suicide beside the Wujiang River. The melody is mournful and tragic to reflect the desolation and sadness of Xiang Yu. Finally, the climax of the piece depicts the triumph of the victor Liu Bang.

Today "Ambush from All Sides" still remains one of the most popular pipa music pieces in China.
