= Guoyue =

Music genre

- Traditional Chinese: 國樂
- Simplified Chinese: 国乐
- Literal meaning: "national music"
Transcriptions
Standard Mandarin
- Hanyu Pinyin: guóyuè

Guoyue (Chinese: 國樂; lit. 'national music'; also minyue (民乐), huayue (華樂) or zhongyue (中樂)), refers to the music composed for Chinese musical instruments, which is an extension of Chinese traditional music. It is often written for some form of grand presentation through a large Chinese orchestra, as well as performances with solo instruments. It is frequently broadcast on radio and television in the People's Republic of China, and it is also the primary form of Chinese music taught in conservatories in China, as well as in Taiwan and Singapore.

== Terms and definitions ==
=== Names ===
The term guoyue appeared in various ancient texts and had various different meanings before the 20th century. It was used as early as the Sui-Tang period to refer to court music or yayue. In the Music Record section of History of Liao, it was used to distinguish the music of the Khitan rulers from that of the Han Chinese. During the Qing dynasty it was used to refer to the kind of ceremonial court repertoire that was seen as a representation of China.

In the early 20th century, guoyue became a popular term used loosely to include all music written for Chinese instruments in response to a particular nationalistic consciousness. Later, after Communist victory in 1949, a new term minyue, short for minzu yinyue (民族音乐) meaning national or people's music, was used in mainland China to encompass all compositions and genres for traditional instruments including music of ethnic minorities. In Taiwan it continues to be known as guoyue, but in other Chinese communities, it may also be referred to as huayue (for example in Singapore and Malaysia) or zhongyue (in Hong Kong).

=== Usage of term ===
In the early 20th century, the term guoyue was widely used to distinguish between imported Western music and traditional Chinese music. It therefore included all Han Chinese music but excluded anything written for Western instruments. In its broadest sense it includes all Chinese instrumental music, opera, regional folk genres, and solo pieces.

Not everyone however agreed on its modern definition, and what constituted guoyue changed with time and locations. Originally it only referred to the music of Han Chinese, later it also included the music of various ethnic minorities in China. Some argued that it should only refer to music of Confucian rituals (yayue) and the literati, while to others it included all Chinese forms of music as long as it is not European. In the new Republic of China in Taiwan, guoyue emphasized the traditional music of mainland China over the Taiwanese local traditions.

The guoyue that was envisioned in the early 20th century was not entirely traditional. To many, part of the idea was to reshape Chinese folk and art music fit for the modern age. To composer Xian Xinghai, "traditional music should be improved by adding harmony and counterpoint", while to musician Zhao Feng the national music culture would be the combination of Chinese melodies and Western professional techniques. Some also made a distinction between the regional music as performed by untrained folk musicians, i.e. the raw material from which guoyue is drawn, and the more polished national music. In this view guoyue is therefore a polished, modernized form of traditional Chinese music.

Some forms of traditional music were also excluded at various times. In mainland China after 1949, folk music was promoted but classical Chinese music was also condemned as decadent and reactionary and became sidelined. During the Cultural Revolution classical Chinese music virtually disappeared, and some only survived by being reworked in a "light" style. Much of what was taught and performed as classical music consisted of arrangement and recompositions of older repertory; however, there have been more interest in the original classical repertory since the 1990s.

== History ==
=== Origin ===
In the early part of the 20th century after the fall of the Qing dynasty, Chinese intellectuals were interested in modernizing and revitalizing traditional Chinese music. Cai Yuanpei, the president of Peking University and an important figure in the May Fourth Movement, proposed using certain aspects of Western music to compensate for the perceived weakness in Chinese music. As part of the New Culture Movement of the period, the guoyue music genre emerged to promote greater patriotism In the 1920s. Many groups in Shanghai associated themselves as "National Music Clubs" such as the Great Unity National Music Club (大同國樂會) founded by Zheng Jinwen (鄭覲文). Chinese regional music become incorporated into modern education institution, for example by Liu Tianhua at the Peking University, where the Institute for the Improvement of National Music (國樂改進社; Guóyuè Gǎijìnshè) was founded in 1927. A periodical, the Music Magazine (音樂雜誌; Yīnyuè Zázhì), were also established. Liu Tianhua promoted what was then regional folk instruments such as erhu, adopted Western music techniques and methods of teaching for such instruments. He composed music pieces for erhu and adopted violin playing techniques to the instrument. National identity and pride also became important during the Second Sino-Japanese War and the Chinese Civil War throughout the 1930s.

=== Development of modern Chinese orchestra (1930s-1960s) ===
The Chinese orchestra represents a significant force in the development of guoyue. Although there were orchestras in ancient times, the Chinese orchestra that is now commonly found in China and overseas Chinese communities is a modern creation that gradually developed through a series of experimentation starting in the 1920s. It is modeled on Western symphony orchestra but drawn initially from traditional sizhu ensemble (絲竹; sizhu; 'silk and bamboo', are two traditional classifications for string and wind instruments). In Beijing, Liu Tianhua formed a sizhu ensemble and wrote for the ensemble, expanding on traditional musical notation so it may be used for an orchestra, specifying ornamentation details and tempo and the use of particular instruments in specific sections. Another major contributors to its development was Zheng Jinwen, who first experimented by increasing the number of player in a Jiangnan sizhu ensemble to 35, and separated the instruments into different sections. He also started the process of standardization of the instruments, for example inventing method to resolve the problem of traditional instruments such as dizi where the fundamental tuning for various instruments may be different. In the past each player may also embellish the parts at will, but in this new orchestra, Zheng wrote specific music for each instruments or sections.

In 1935, a music ensemble was formed at the Broadcasting Corporation of China (BCC) in Nanjing for the broadcasting of traditional Chinese music. Due to the Sino-Japanese war, the ensemble later moved to Chongqing, where it held its first public performance in 1942. The ensemble also held classes, and it quickly expanded with extra instruments added. It became known as the BCC Chinese Orchestra, often considered the first Chinese orchestra formed. The orchestra was organized along the line of a Western orchestra in a form that is recognizable today, with a conductor, full scores for musicians, and four different sections - wind, plucked strings, bowed strings, and percussion. The plucked strings section is unique to Chinese orchestra due to the large number of traditional Chinese lute-type instruments.

In 1953, the PRC government established its first Chinese orchestra, the Central Broadcasting Station Orchestra in Beijing, based on the early models. The tuning of the instruments was shifted to the equal-tempered tuning system. Further instruments were also added to enhance the sound and range of the orchestra. The Vanguard Chinese Folk Orchestra also added a variety of musical instruments to the orchestra. New pieces based on regional music and other traditional Chinese music were composed for the orchestra.

By the 1960s, a largely standardized form of Chinese orchestra had emerged. The modern Chinese orchestra has since become a cultural institution in China as well as Chinese communities outside of mainland China. Amateur Chinese orchestras are commonly found in Taiwan, Hong Kong, Singapore, Malaysia organized by clan associations, community centres and schools. Professional Chinese orchestras include Shanghai Chinese Orchestra, China Central Chinese Orchestra, Hong Kong Chinese Orchestra, Singapore Chinese Orchestra and Taipei Chinese Orchestra.

=== 1980s ===
In 1980 the Chinese Musicians' Association was formally elected to the "International Musicological Society". Chinese musical groups toured foreign countries, and foreign musical organizations performed in China. In the mid-1980s popular ballads, western folk and classical music still drew the greatest audiences, but other kinds of music, including previously banned western jazz and rock and roll, were being performed with greater acceptance especially among the youth.

=== 2000s ===
Guoyue music made its comeback into mainstream popular music in the 2000s by Taiwanese composer Jay Chou and songwriter Vincent Fang, who coined the term Zhongguo Feng (中國風; 'Chinese Wind') to describe the style of the album The Eight Dimensions which fuses modern rock and contemporary R&B together with traditional Chinese music.

== Repertoire ==
Many of the early pieces composed were based on regional and traditional pieces. The early compositions may be written for a Jiangnan sizhu ensemble or other instruments, some may be developed later into orchestral composition. A well-known orchestral piece is the Dance of the Yao People which was based on the folk music of the Yao minority. It was originally written for a Western orchestra, but later also arranged as a Chinese orchestral piece. Similarly other popular pieces such as Butterfly Lovers' Violin Concerto were also reworked for Chinese orchestra as a concerto piece for erhu or pipa.

Many solo pieces for various Chinese instrument have also composed, and these pieces may be performed solo or arranged with accompaniment by other instruments or a full orchestra. Examples of these solo pieces are "Night Song of the Fisherman" (漁舟唱晚) which was composed for the guzheng in 1936 based on an old Shandong piece "Double Beat" (雙板), Dance of the Yi People composed for the pipa in 1965, and "The Moon Mirrored in the Erquan Pool" (二泉映月) composed for the erhu by Abing. Many of these tunes have also been arranged for a Chinese orchestra, most notably by Peng Xiuwen.

=== Solo pieces ===
Some of these are traditional pieces, and new composition may also be based on older traditional tunes, although some are entirely original. Many of these have also been arranged for larger orchestra.

Title	Chinese	Composers/Arrangers	Year	Instruments	Note
The General's Command	將軍令			Guzheng	
Night Song of the Fisherman	漁舟唱晚	Lou Shuhua (婁樹華)	1936	Guzheng	Based on a traditional tune
Jasmine Flower	茉莉花			Erhu/Guzheng	18th century composition
Horse Racing	賽馬	Huang Haihuai (黄海懷)	1959	Erhu	
The Moon Mirrored in the Erquan Pool	二泉映月	Abing	1930s	Erhu	Later orchestral arrangement by Peng Xiuwen
The Purple Bamboo Tune	紫竹調			Dizi/Erhu	Traditional, orchestral version by Peng Xiuwen
Suzhou Travel	姑蘇行	Jiang Xianwei (江先渭)	1962	Dizi	
Partridge in Flight	鷓鴣飛			Dizi	Based on a Hunan tune
Phoenix Spreading Their Wings	鳳凰展翅	Hu Tianquan (胡天泉), Dong Hongde (董洪德)	1956	Sheng	
Hundred Birds Pay Homage to Phoenix	百鳥朝鳳	Ren Tongxiang (任同祥)	1953	Suona	Based on a traditional tune, later piano arrangement by Wang Jianzhong
Ambushed from Ten Sides	十面埋伏			Pipa	Qing dynasty composition
Dance of the Yi People	彝族舞曲	Wang Huiran (王惠然)	1965	Pipa	
Spring Flowers on Moonlit River	春江花月夜	Liu Raozhang (柳堯章), Zheng Jinwen (鄭覲文)	1925	Pipa/Guzheng	Rearrangement of a traditional pipa tune (夕陽簫鼓)

=== Orchestral works ===
==== Earlier orchestral pieces ====
English Title	Chinese Title	Composer	Year	Note
Coloured Cloud Chasing the Moon	彩雲追月	Ren Guang	1935	Based on a Qing dynasty Cantonese piece. Also reorganized for an orchestra in 1960 by Peng Xiuwen. Later piano arrangement by Yin Chengzong and Wang Jianzhong
Dance of the Golden Snake	金蛇狂舞	Nie Er	1934	Arranged from a traditional piece, later Western orchestral arrangement by Tang Jianping
Beautiful Flowers on a Full Moon	花好月圓	Huang Yijun (黄貽鈞)	1935	Orchestral arrangement by Peng Xiuwen
Dance of the Yao People	瑤族舞曲	Liu Tieshan (劉鐵山), Mao Yuan	1952	First written for a Western orchestra
Full of Joy	喜洋洋	Liu Mingyuan	1958	Based on Shanxi folk songs

==== Modern compositions ====
The following are several examples of pieces written for large modern Chinese orchestra. These musical works utilise Western musical composition techniques, as well as the inclusion of Western instruments like cello, double bass, harp and Western percussion.

English Title	Chinese Title	Composer	Number of Movements	List of Movements	Elaboration
Symphony No. 2 "Ode to Peace"	第二交响曲"和平颂"	Zhao Jiping 赵季平	5	I: Jinling and the Yangtze River 金陵·大江, II: The Tears of the River 江泪, III: The Sorrow of the River 江怨, IV: The Fury of the River 江怒, V: Ode to Peace 和平颂	A five-movement symphony that depicts the infamous Second Sino-Japanese War and the Nanjing Massacre.
Journey to Lhasa	拉萨行	Kuan Nai-chung 关乃忠	4	I: Potala Palace 布达拉宫, II: Yarlung Tsangpo River 雅鲁藏布江, III: Heavenly Burial 天葬, IV: Vanquishing Demons 打鬼	Composed in 1984, this four-movement symphonic suite depicts the scenery of Tibet and the culture of the Tibetan people.
Reminiscences of Yunnan	云南回忆	Liu Xing 刘星	3	I: Moderato 中庸的中板, II: Lento 呆滞的慢板, III: Allegro 机械的快板	A three-movement concerto for zhongruan and modern Chinese orchestra. Also known as "Zhongruan Concerto No. 1" (第一中阮协奏曲).
Impressions of Chinese Music	印象国乐	Jiang Ying 姜莹	3	I:小鸟乐, II: 前世今生, III: 大曲	
A Glimpse of the Taklamakan	塔克拉玛干掠影	Jin Xiang 金湘	4	I: 漠原, II: A Lost Empire in the Desert 漠楼, III: 漠舟, IV: 漠州	This four-movement tone poem depicts the grand Taklamakan Desert in northwest China.
The Silk Road	丝绸之路	Jiang Ying 姜莹	Standalone piece		Also known as "Kumtag" (库姆塔格).
Variations of Emotion	抒情变奏曲	Liu Changyuan 刘长远	3	Unnamed movements; the three movements are simply labeled "Movement I", "Movement II", "Movement III".	This piece consists of 15 variations based on one main theme, divided into three movements.
The Yellow River Capriccio	黄河畅想	Cheng Dazhao 程大兆	Standalone piece		It is the finale in the symphonic suite "Roots of the Chinese" (華夏之根).
Spring	春	Lu Lianghui 卢亮辉	Standalone piece		
Summer	夏	Lu Lianghui 卢亮辉	Standalone piece		
Autumn	秋	Lu Lianghui 卢亮辉	Standalone piece		
Winter	冬	Lu Lianghui 卢亮辉	Standalone piece		
The Terracotta Warriors Fantasia	秦·兵马俑幻想曲	Peng Xiuwen 彭修文	Standalone piece		
Impressions of the Mountain and the Sea	山海印象	Su Wenqing 苏文庆	Standalone piece		
The Age of Dragon	龙年新世纪	Kuan Nai-chung 关乃忠	4	I: The Sun 太阳, II: The Moon 月亮, III: The Stars 星辰, IV: The Land 大地	A four-movement concerto written for Chinese percussion, Western percussion and modern Chinese orchestra.
Dabo River Caprice	达勃河随想曲	He Xuntian 何训田	2	I: Adagio 柔板, II: Allegretto 小快板	Composed in 1982, this musical work depicts the exotic beauty of the Dabo River in Sichuan and the life of the Baima Tibetan people living in the area.
Three Melodies of West Yunnan	滇西土风三首	Guo Wenjing 郭文景	3	I: A Va Mountain 阿佤山, II: Gino Dance 基诺舞, III: Sacrifice, Torches, Potent Liquor 祭祀·火把·烈酒	This three-movement work depicts the cultures of three different tribal groups based in western Yunnan.
Symphony No. 1 "Jinling"	第一交响曲"金陵"	Peng Xiuwen 彭修文	3	I: Remembrance of Things Past 怀古, II: The Qinhuai River 秦淮, III: Vicissitudes of Life 沧桑	This three-movement symphonic work depicts the rich history and culture of Nanjing, formerly called Jinling.
The Desert Smoke Suite	大漠孤烟直组曲	Zhao Jiping 赵季平	4	II: Seek 音诗-觅, IV: Elegy 悼歌	
Northwest Suite	西北组曲	Tan Dun 谭盾	4	I: The Timely Rain Fall from High Heaven 老天爷下甘雨, II: 闹洞房, III: 想亲亲, IV: The Sidedrum in Stoneplate Form 石板腰鼓	Also known as "Northwest Suite No. 1" (西北第一组曲).
The Mohe Tribe Suite	靺鞨组曲	Liu Xijin 刘锡津	6	I: Warriors 武士, II: Princess 公主, III: 百戏童, IV: 酒舞, V: The Battle of Hualin 桦林大战, VI: 踏垂舞	
The Legend of Shadi'er	沙迪尔传奇	Liu Yuan 刘湲	Standalone piece		Also known as "The Uyghur Tone Poem" (维吾尔音诗).
The Great Wall Capriccio	长城随想	Liu Wenjin 刘文金	4	I: Strolling Through the Mountain Pass 关山行, II: Beacon March 烽火操, III: Memorial for the Patriots 忠魂祭, IV: Looking Afar 遥望篇	A four-movement concerto for erhu and modern Chinese orchestra.
Empress Earth	后土	Tang Jianping 唐建平	Standalone piece		

== Guoyue performers ==
=== Conductors ===
- Peng Xiuwen
- Pang Kapang
- Liu Chiang Pin

== See also ==
- Guoyue (國樂)
- Yayue (雅樂)
- Nanguan music (南管)
- Beiguan music (北管)
- Taoist music
- List of Chinese musical instruments
- Chinese Cultural Renaissance
- Musical nationalism
- Historical Chinese anthems
- Cultural Revolution
