= Chinese orchestra =

Four-section orchestra in modern China

The term Chinese orchestra is most commonly used to refer to the modern Chinese orchestra that is found in China and various overseas Chinese communities. This modern Chinese orchestra first developed out of Jiangnan sizhu ensemble in the 1920s into a form that is based on the structure and principles of a Western symphony orchestra but using Chinese instruments. The orchestra is divided into four sections – wind, plucked strings, bowed strings, and percussion, and usually performs modernized traditional music called guoyue. The orchestra may be referred to as Minzu Yuetuan (Chinese: 民族乐团) or Minyuetuan (Chinese: 民乐团) in mainland China, Chung Ngok Tuen (Chinese: 中樂團) in Hong Kong, Huayuetuan (Chinese: 华乐团) in Southeast Asia, or Guoyuetuan (Chinese: 國樂團; lit. 'national orchestra') in Taiwan.

The term modern Chinese orchestra is sometimes used to distinguish the current form from ancient Chinese orchestras that existed since the Shang dynasty and was used in royal courts and later during Confucian ceremonies.

== Ancient Chinese orchestra ==
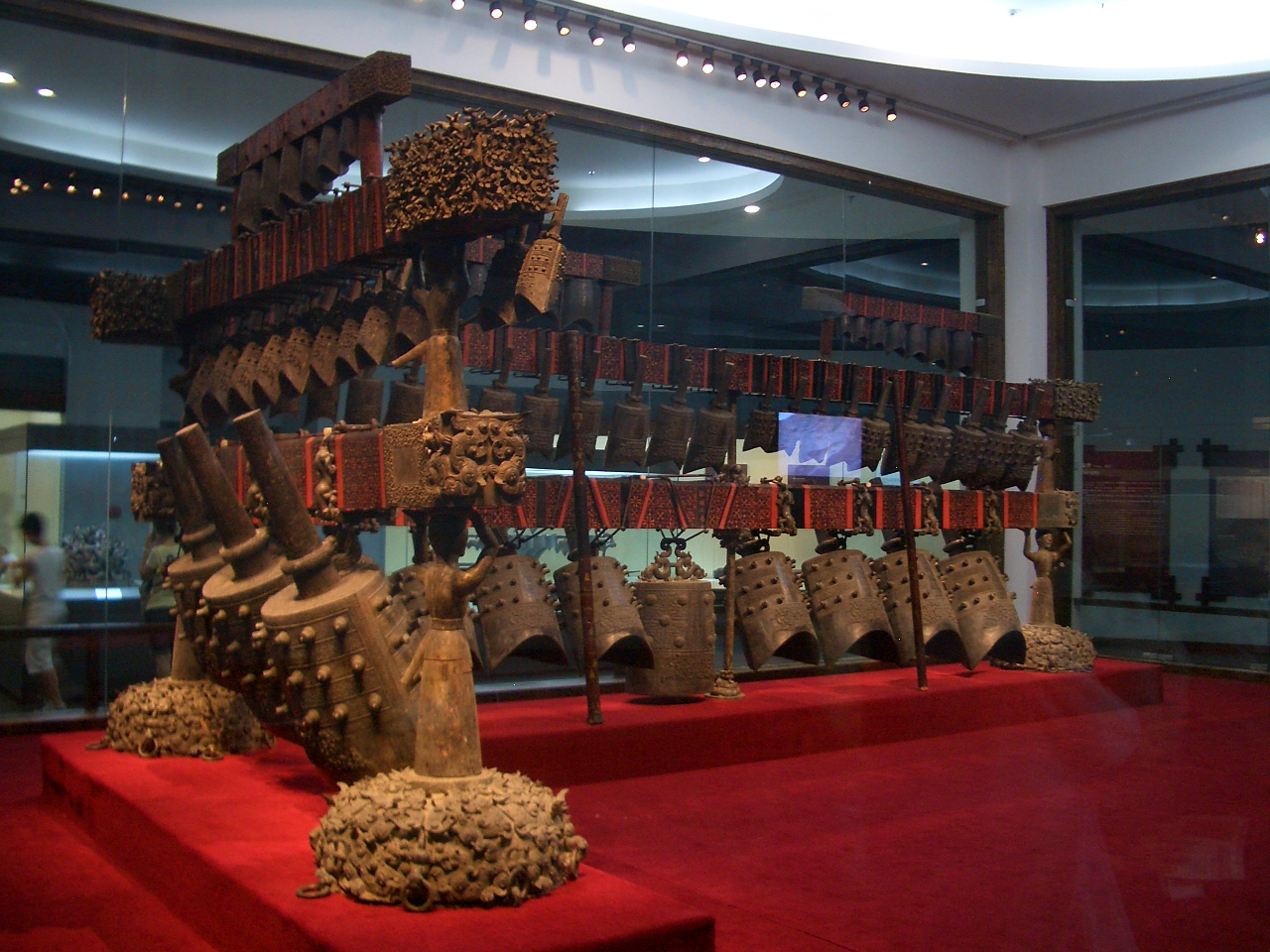
Set of bronze bells (Bianzhong) from the tomb of Marquis Yi of Zeng, 433 BC.

Archaeological findings suggest that ancient China had a highly developed and sophisticated music culture. Music was an important element in traditional ritualistic ceremonies during the Shang dynasty (c. 1550-1111 BC), and it reached one of its peaks during the Zhou dynasty (c. 1111–222 BC). The ancient orchestra of the Zhou dynasty played a form of ceremonial music known as yayue.

It featured a great abundance of percussion instruments. There were also several wind instruments, but only a few zither-type string instruments were used. All the bowed string instruments and many plucked string instruments first came to China from Central Asia after the Han dynasty (202 BC-AD 219).

The Six Dynasties era following the collapse of the Han dynasty saw a wave of musical influence from Central Asia, and Central Asian Music became very popular during the Sui-Tang dynasty period. The Tang period was a very important epoch in the evolution of Chinese music, and court banquet music called yanyue (燕樂) was the dominant form of music during this era. The number of orchestras in the Tang court may reach ten, each playing a different form of music including yanyue, qingyue, and music of other places such as Kucha, Kashgar, Samarkand, Korea and India. The Tang imperial court also had a large outdoor band of nearly 1,200 performers. Chinese music then continued to evolve during the Song dynasty (AD 960–1279) with major development in yayue, and a yayue orchestra in this period may have over 200 instrumentalists.

Aside from the orchestras found in the court, musical ensembles, for example those in the sizhu and nanguan tradition, were also found among the general population to provide popular entertainment, and religious groupings may perform music in festivals and other religious settings.

Traditional Chinese musical instruments were classified into eight groups (bayin) according to their materials: gourd, earthenware, hide, wood, stone, bronze, silk and bamboo. It is said that there were more than 70 different musical instruments, but many of them have been lost or are obsolete today.

== Modern Chinese orchestra ==
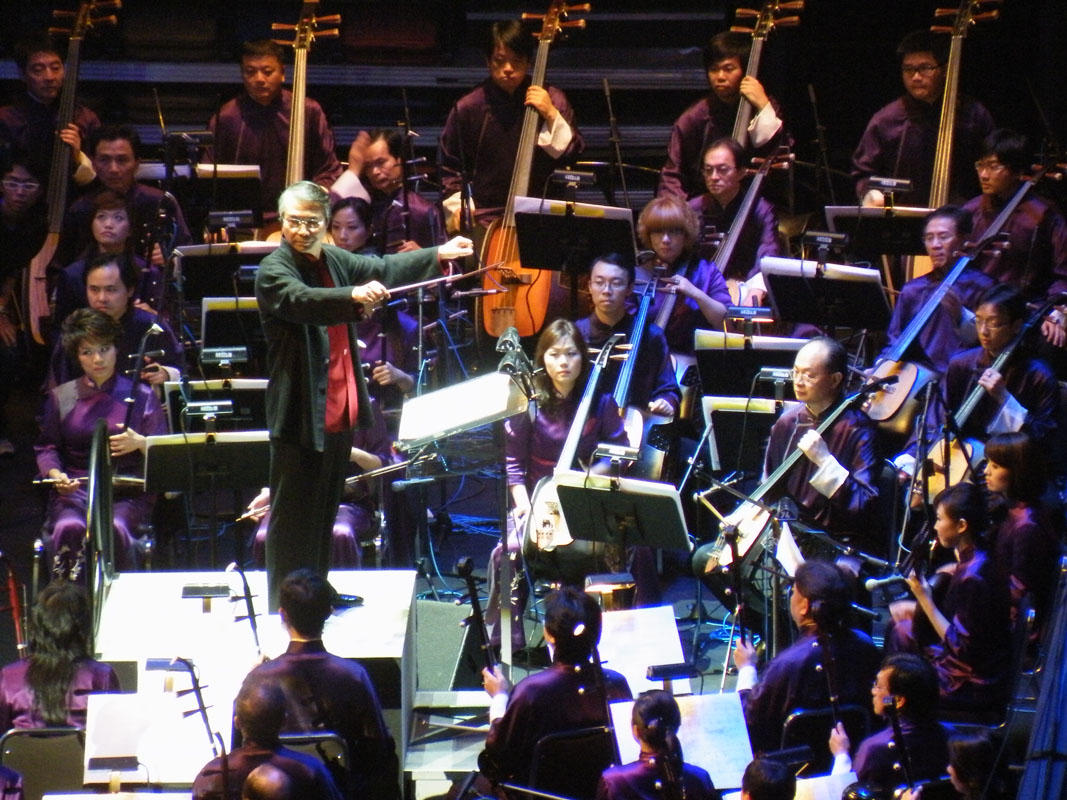
Hong Kong Chinese Orchestra, one of the foremost modern Chinese orchestras

The modern large Chinese orchestra is a 20th-century development and is based on the Western symphony orchestra, but uses Chinese instruments in place of Western instruments. It also emulates the Western orchestra in terms of the seating position of its musicians and composition techniques. The music produced by the Chinese orchestra however is unique and very distinct from any Western counterpart. Such orchestras usually perform Chinese orchestral music called guoyue or minyue, although its repertoire may occasionally include adaptations of Western orchestral pieces or music originally composed for Western instruments.

=== Origin and development ===
In the early 20th century a number of Chinese musicians became interested in improving traditional Chinese music. While some such as Xiao Youmei, Yuen Ren Chao and He Luting promoted Western music, others defended traditional Chinese and worked to improve it. After the president of Peking University, Cai Yuanpei, proposed using the best of the Western musical tradition to compensate for the perceived weaknesses in Chinese music, the Peking University Music Society was formed in 1919. The interest in improving traditional Chinese music along Western model led to a number of music club and ensembles being formed in various cities. An early pioneer was Zheng Jinwen (鄭覲文, 1872–1935) who founded a music institution in Shanghai in 1921, the Great Unity Music Society (大同樂會; Dàtóng Yuèhuì), to develop and maintain Chinese music in the modern age, recreating ancient music and instruments as well as creating new ensemble music for Chinese instruments. Zheng experimented with increasing the number of player in a Jiangnan sizhu ensemble to 35, and separated the instruments into different sections. He began to standardize the instruments, for example inventing methods to resolve the problem of traditional instruments such as dizi where the fundamental tuning for various instruments may be different. He also updated traditional instruments such as the sheng by increasing the number of pipes to increase its range and allow it to play harmony and chords. In the past, each player would embellish their parts at will, but in this new orchestra, Zheng wrote specific music for each instrument or sections. An early signature tune of the music club was "Spring Flowers on Moonlit River" (春江花月夜; Chūnjiāng huāyuè yè), arranged for the ensemble by Liu Yaozhang (柳堯章) in 1925 based on an older tune for pipa.

Another important figure of this period was Liu Tianhua who also formed a sizhu ensemble as part of the activity of the Society for Improving National Music he established at Peking University in 1927, and a periodical, the Music Magazine (音樂雜誌; Yīnyuè Zázhì), was founded. Breaking from a tradition where each part is played by only one player, he formed an ensemble where more than one player may play a part. He made changes to traditional instruments such as huqin and wrote music for it, turning a folk instrument into one suitable for concert performance. Liu also wrote for the ensemble and expanded on traditional musical notation so it may be used for an orchestra, specifying ornamentation details and tempo and the use of particular instruments in specific sections.

In 1935, a music ensemble was formed at the Broadcasting Company of China (BCC, also known as Central Broadcasting Company) in Nanjing for the broadcasting of traditional Chinese music. Due to the Sino-Japanese war, the ensemble later moved to Chongqing, where it held its first public performance in 1942. The ensemble also held classes, and it quickly expanded. In order to increase the pitch range, extra instruments were invented and added to the ensemble, such as the middle-to-low range zhonghu, dahu, dihu. An eleven-hole dizi called xindi that can produce a complete chromatic scale was also invented. It became known as the BCC Chinese Orchestra, which is considered to be the first Chinese orchestra formed. The orchestra was organized along the line of a Western orchestra into a form that is recognizable today, with a conductor, full scores for musicians, and four sections – wind, plucked strings, bowed strings, and percussion. The plucked string section is unique to Chinese orchestra due to the large number of traditional Chinese lute-type instruments. The orchestra moved to Taiwan after the Communist victory in 1949.

A number of folk ensembles were established in the 1950s in the PRC, the first of these was the Shanghai Chinese Orchestra. In 1953, the PRC government established a Chinese orchestra for the broadcast of Chinese music, the 35-member Central Broadcasting Station Orchestra in Beijing, which included some former members of the BCC Chinese Orchestra and is based on the earlier orchestras but with further changes. The tuning of the instruments was shifted to the equal-tempered tuning system, improvements were made to instruments, and further various newly created instruments based on traditional instruments, such as gehu, daruan, zhongsheng, were added to enhance the sound and range of the orchestra. Traditional pieces, as well as regional ensemble music were rearranged for a large orchestra. Peng Xiuwen, who became the conductor of the orchestra in 1956, adapted many pieces for the orchestra. Another significant orchestra was the Vanguard Chinese Folk Orchestra that added instruments such as liuqin, zhuihu, datongsheng, disuona, yunluo and paigu. By the 1960s, a largely standardized and modernized form of Chinese orchestra had emerged, although experimentation with the orchestra, compositions and instruments used continues to the present day.

The modern Chinese orchestra has since become a cultural institution in China as well as Chinese communities outside of mainland China. Amateur Chinese orchestras are commonly found in Taiwan, Hong Kong, Singapore, Malaysia where they may be organized by clan associations, community centres and schools, and some professional orchestras are also formed. For example, in Singapore the first amateur Chinese orchestra was formed in 1959, and its professional Singapore Chinese Orchestra was founded in 1974.

=== Notation ===
Whilst jianpu is sometimes used in the modern Chinese orchestra for Chinese instruments, standard notation (五线谱) is more commonly used throughout the entire orchestra. Modern Chinese orchestral works are often published in standard notation, both parts and full scores.

=== Recent developments ===
In September 2008, the 21st Century Chinese Orchestra Development Group (CO21) was formed by enthusiasts to gather support for the improvement of orchestra formation and instruments that have hindered the development of Chinese classical music. Suggested improvements included a change in orchestra layout, the use of staff notation and also modifications to existing instruments.

== Instruments in modern orchestra ==
The modern Chinese orchestra typically consists of four main sections. These instruments are generally grouped according to the way they are played – the bowed strings (inclusive of the Western bass section), plucked strings, woodwinds and percussion. Many of the Chinese instruments are modified versions of traditional instruments, for example, the diyinsheng (large bass sheng), and the zhongyin (alto) suona, which is fitted with keys. These modifications are based on their Western counterparts.

Many modern Chinese orchestral pieces include parts written for Western instruments such as harp, cello and double bass, as well as Western percussion instruments. In fact, the roles of cello, double bass and Western percussion in modern Chinese orchestra are so important that almost all compositions use them. However, certain composers may prefer to use the gehu in place of cello, or the diyingehu (Bass Gehu) in place of double bass.

=== Plucked strings ===
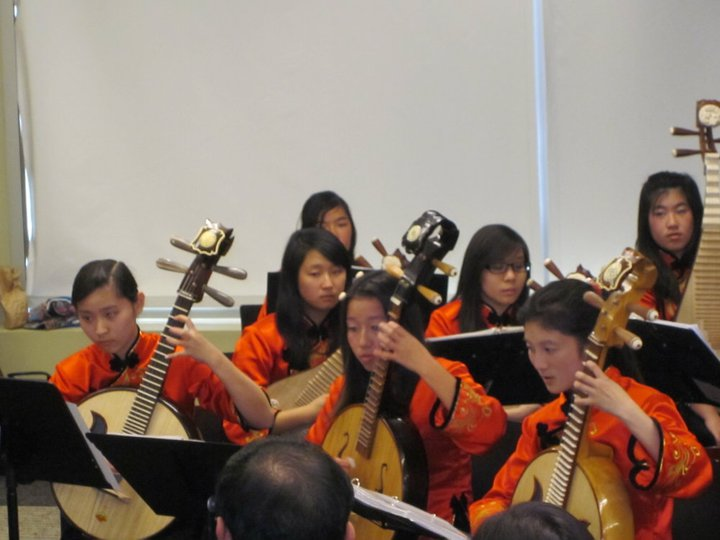
Musicians in a plucked string section in a Chinese orchestra.

The plucked strings section is unique to modern Chinese orchestra due to the large number of plucked instruments in China. This section consists of the liuqin, yangqin, pipa, zhongruan, and daruan.

Some compositions include parts for the se, guzheng, konghou, sanxian, or harp.

This section sets the structure of modern Chinese orchestras apart from their Western counterparts. This largely plucked chordophone-based section creates tunes different from that of the Western orchestral instruments.

==== Yangqin ====
The yangqin is a dulcimer played using a pair of bamboo mallets rubberised on one end. Besides hitting the strings with the rubberised ends, the mallets can also be turned over to create a sharper note (this technique is called fanzhu). Some songs even require the player to hold the mallets vertically and use the other end or even using the player hands to pluck. It is a versatile instrument capable of playing rapid running notes or arpeggios.

==== Liuqin ====
The liuqin is a soprano range lute. It looks similar to the pipa but smaller with two sound holes on each side of the body. The four strings are tuned G3-D4-G4-D5. By pressing slightly above any of the frets on the instrument, one can vary the pitch of the liuqin. It is commonly played using a plectrum like in the guitar. The sound is very bright and penetrating, making it a very effective soprano instrument. Its range is similar to that of a violin.

==== Pipa ====
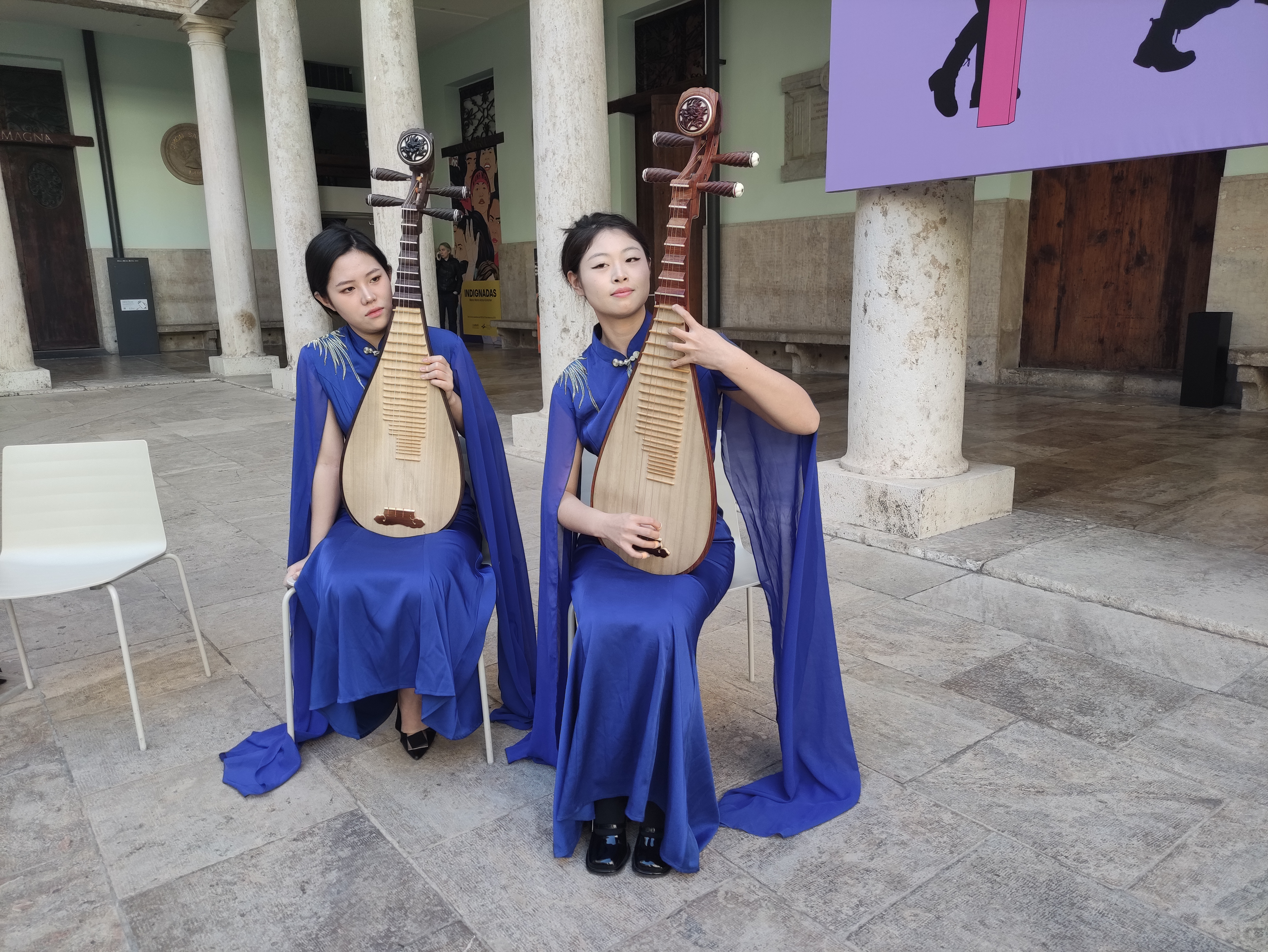
Two Pipa players of the NENU Folkloric Orchestra playing in a concert in Valencia.

The pipa is the alto range member of the plucked string section. One of the more well-known Chinese instruments, this instrument has been associated with imperial concubines and songstresses at teahouses, often conveying the stereotypical image of a demure damsel. Despite the absence of soundholes, it is able to produce music as well as other plucked string instruments. The modern-day player has to wear a set of customised acrylic nails on the right hand. From simple plucking with the thumb and index finger and saoxian (sweeping one's fingers across all strings with gusto) to yaozhi (tilting the instrument and using the middle finger to continuously cut across the strings) and lunzou (by plucking with all five fingers, one after another in a wavelike motion), the playing techniques of the pipa are visibly dimensionless. Its tuning is A2-D3-E3-A3.

==== Zhongruan ====
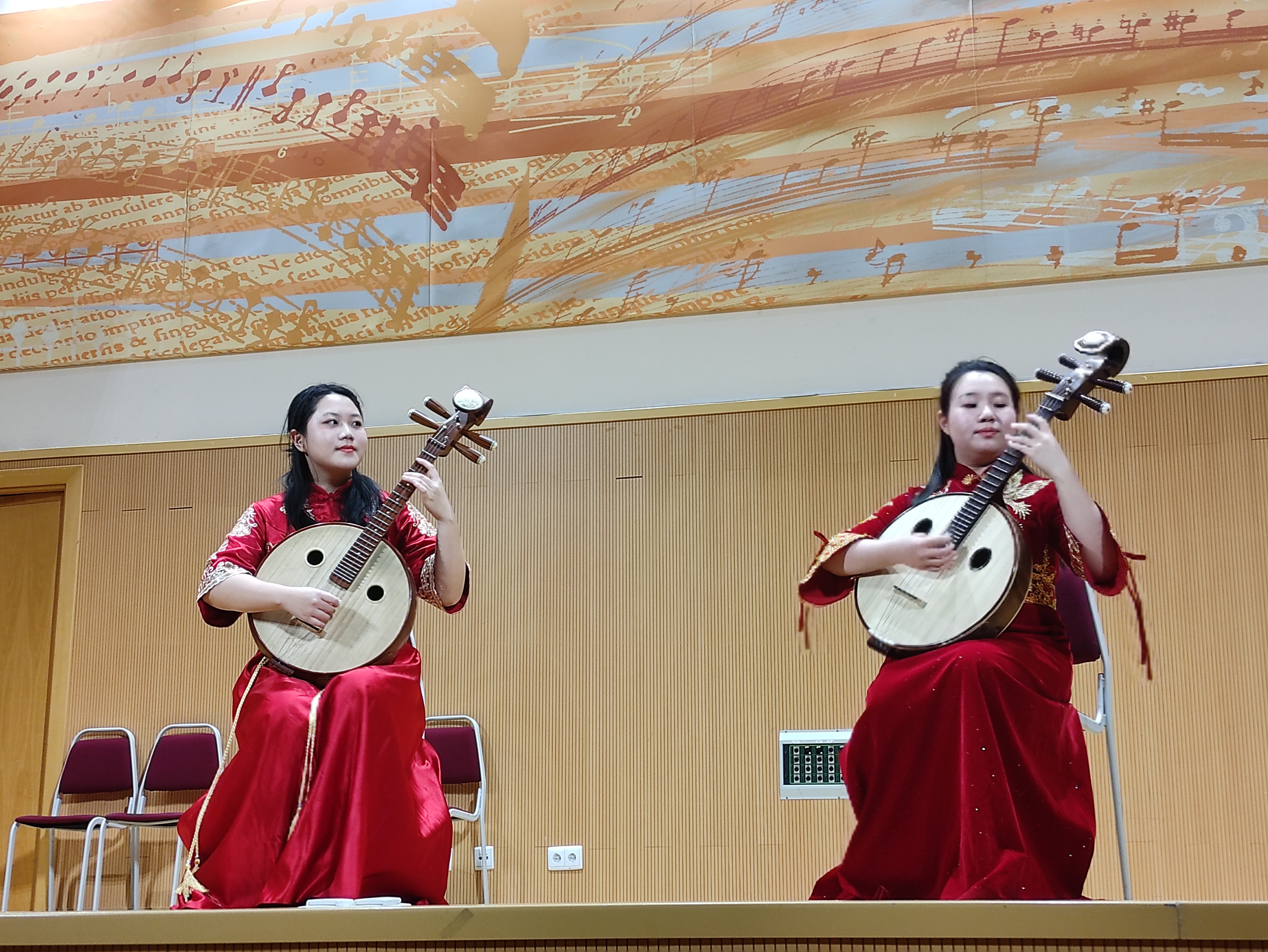
Two Zhongruan players of the NENU Folkloric Orchestra playing in a concert in Torrent, Land of Valencia.

The zhongruan plays the role of the tenor in this section. Its four strings are tuned to G2-D3-G3-D4. The instrument can be played using a plectrum similar to a guitar pick, as with the liuqin, or using a set of 2 to 5 acrylic fingernails. Mainstream ruan players use plectrums, though there are some schools which teach the fingernail technique, similar to that of the pipa. Pipa players who play ruan as a second instrument also use fingernails. Plectrums produce a louder and clearer tone, which makes them suitable for orchestral use. Fingernails allow performance of polyphonic solo music, however this advantage is not useful in orchestras, where the zhongruan mainly plays the accompaniment. It possesses a very mellow tone.

==== Daruan ====
The daruan is the bass lute. A larger version of the zhongruan with strings tuned to a perfect fourth lower: D2-A2-D3-A3. Soloists generally use the D-A-D-A tuning, as it allows easy performance of diatonic chords. Some orchestral players tune to C-G-D-A, which is the same as cello tuning. The advantage of using C-G-D-A in orchestras is so that the daruan can easily double the cello part.

Other members of the ruan family are gaoyinruan (soprano, tuning G3-D4-G4-D5); xiaoruan (alto, tuning D3-A3-D4-A4) and diyinruan (contrabass, tuning G1-D2-G2-D3).

==== Sanxian ====
The sanxian is the only plucked string instrument without frets. As can be inferred from the name (san, lit. three; xian, lit. string), it has three strings. The sanxian family of instruments is very large, with different variants used in different tribes in China. The orchestra often uses dasanxian (da, lit. large) has a soundbox covered on both sides with python skin. Its sound is forceful, penetrating and articulated; in fact, a single sanxian can be clearly heard even in a 70-member orchestra.

It has a strong folk flavour, which often puts it in the limelight when in usage with other instruments. For this reason too, it is not suitable for playing accompaniment, as it tends to overshadow the sound of the melody instruments. It is more frequently used in plucked string ensembles and solos. Even when used in the orchestra, it is also attributed with the main melody. However, since the orchestral usage of the sanxian is lower as compared to the other instruments, sanxian players also take up a second instrument, which is usually the zhongruan.

Sometimes yueqin are also included in this section.

==== Guzheng ====
The guzheng is a Chinese plucked zither. Generally, it has 18 or more strings and movable bridges. Performers use picks to play this instrument and they are known as "daimao". Performers can play guzheng with both hands with different skills. There are usually a few guzheng members in a Chinese Orchestra, but it can also be played as a solo instrument. It emerged from the Warring period and became more popular since the Qin dynasty.

=== Bowed strings ===
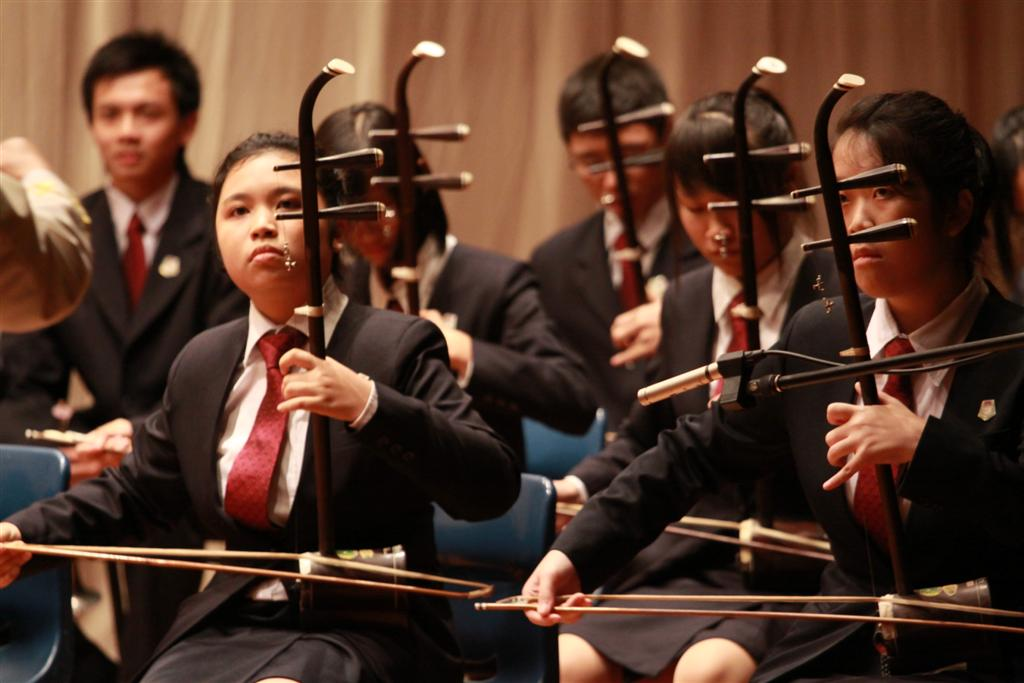
Erhu players in the bowed strings section of a Chinese orchestra

The bowed strings section of the modern Chinese orchestra includes the gaohu (高胡), erhu (二胡), zhonghu (中胡), cello (大提琴) and double bass (低音提琴 or 倍大提琴). Certain compositions are scored for gehu (革胡) and diyingehu (bass gehu; 低音革胡) in place of cello and double bass respectively; however, the adoption of gehu and diyingehu is limited in Chinese orchestras around the world.

In addition to the above-listed instruments, some musical works include parts for the banhu (板胡) or jinghu (京胡).

Like the violins in Western orchestral music, the erhu part is often divided into erhu I and erhu II parts.

==== Huqin ====
The huqin series of instruments in common usage consist of the erhu, zhonghu and gaohu. The gaohu (highest-pitched of the series) and zhonghu (lowest-pitched huqin) are proportionately fewer in numbers in the Chinese orchestra. The erhu forms the bulk of this section and is divided into distinct sections, known as erhu I and erhu II. These two sub-sections play either similar or vastly different melodies simultaneously, which is akin to the first and second violins in a Western orchestra. Occasionally, the concertmaster will play the banhu but it may not always be the concertmaster – an example is the piece Mang Chun (忙春), or jinghu, for instance in Zhao Ji Ping's Festival Overture, if there is a solo part for it. There are various ways to play an erhu, such as bowing or plucking the strings.

The uniqueness of the huqin series lies in how music can be produced from two fine metal strings less than 2 mm apart, without any frets or fingerboards. Well-known solo pieces for the erhu includes Sanmen Gorge Capriccio, Guang Ming Xing as well as Lan Huahua.

Banhu may sometimes be singularly used in the huqin section if a strong piccolo voice is needed.

==== Cello and double bass ====
The cello and double bass can also be considered part of this section. This is true in some orchestras, but in others the cello and bass are considered distinct from the bowed strings. Some Chinese orchestras still use the gehu and diyingehu (bass gehu), but due to the limitations and the costs of the instruments, they are now quite rare. A notable example of an ensemble still utilising the gehu and diyingehu is the Hong Kong Chinese Orchestra. In some Chinese orchestras in China, they used an instrument called laruan, which has the shape of a ruan but is larger in size and is played by either plucking or using a bow similar to a cello or bass bow.

=== Woodwinds ===
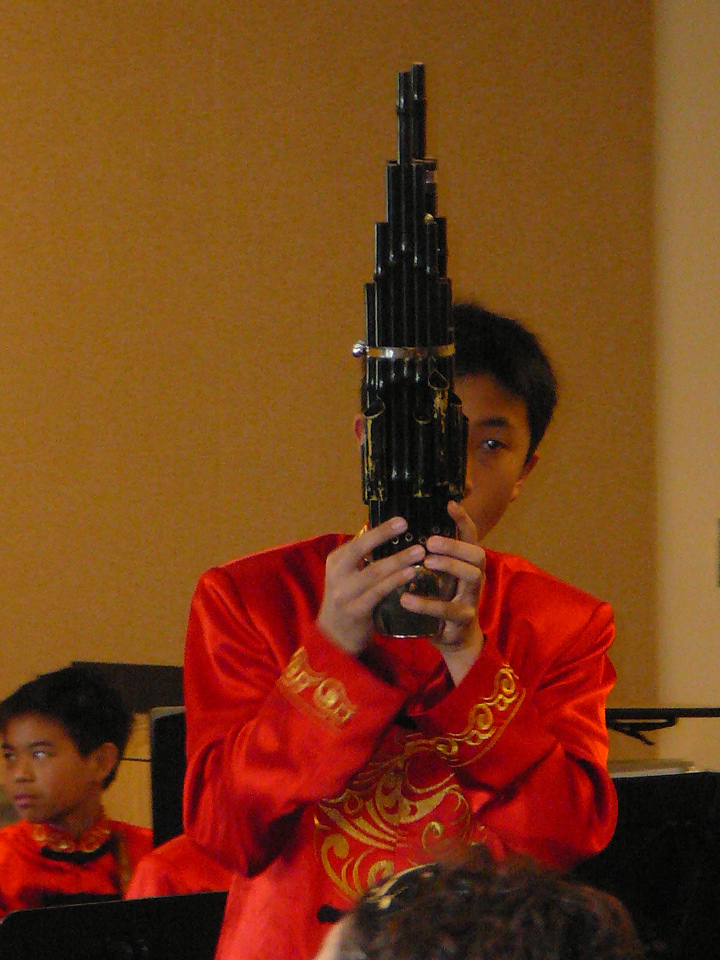
A sheng player in a Chinese orchestra

The woodwinds section of the modern Chinese orchestra consists of the bangdi, qudi, gaoyinsheng (soprano sheng), zhongyinsheng (alto sheng), diyinsheng (bass sheng), gaoyinsuona (soprano suona), zhongyinsuona (alto suona), and diyinsuona (bass suona).

Some pieces are also scored for the xindi, dadi, koudi, bawu, xiao, hailuo, cizhongyinsheng (tenor sheng), cizhongyinsuona (tenor suona), gaoyinguan (soprano guan), zhongyinguan (alto guan), diyinguan (bass guan), or xun.

==== Dizi ====
The main types of dizis frequently used in the wind section are the bangdi (梆笛), the qudi (曲笛), and occasionally the xindi (新笛). The bangdi is shorter in length and smaller in diameter and produces a clear and bright tone. It is frequently used in bangzi opera of Northern and southern China, hence the name bangdi. The longer and thicker qudi produces a richer and mellower tone. The bangdi is usually a fourth higher in pitch than the qudi. The xindi is longer and thicker than the qudi, with extra finger holes and no membrance. It is even lower in pitch and mellower in tone than the qudi. The dadi (or diyindi) may be used as substitution for the xindi, this instrument has a membrane and sounds like a low qudi.

==== Sheng ====
The sheng is a Chinese free-reed bamboo mouth organ. The earliest type ever recorded in history had 14 pipes and was discovered in Zeng Houyi's tomb in Hubei province. The most common types of sheng today include a 17-pipe instrument and a modified version for contemporary compositions, which has an expanded range of 21–42 pipes. The tone of the sheng is lucid and bright. It has a huge range, a chromatically complete scale and is able to produce chord voicings. Most orchestras use a full range of sheng, including the gaoyin (soprano), zhongyin (alto), cizhongyin (tenor) and diyin (bass) sheng.

==== Suona ====
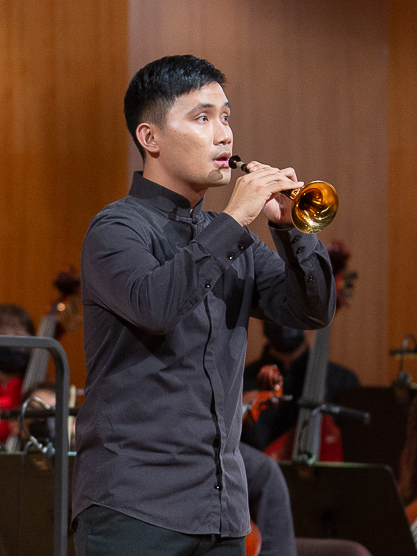
A suona player

The tone produced by suona is loud, piercing and uplifting, thus it is usually used to perform vibrant and lively pieces. However, its repertoire also includes some mellower pieces. The suona is commonly used as an accompaniment in the Chinese opera, singing or dancing, but also for more sombre occasions, such as during a traditional Chinese funeral procession. It is also utilised in solos or ensembles for various occasions and ceremonies. Being a double-reeded wind instrument, it is extremely difficult to master it to produce perfect pitches. There are modified types, such as the keyed alto, tenor and bass suonas. Many suona players are also now doubling on guan, a double-reed Chinese instrument of much mellower quality (like that of the clarinet.) This usage has also led to the development of keyed lower guan, such as the zhongyin and diyin Guans.

Occasionally, koudi, xun, haojiao (horn), hailuo (conch shell) and xiao would also be used according to the composition.

=== Percussion ===
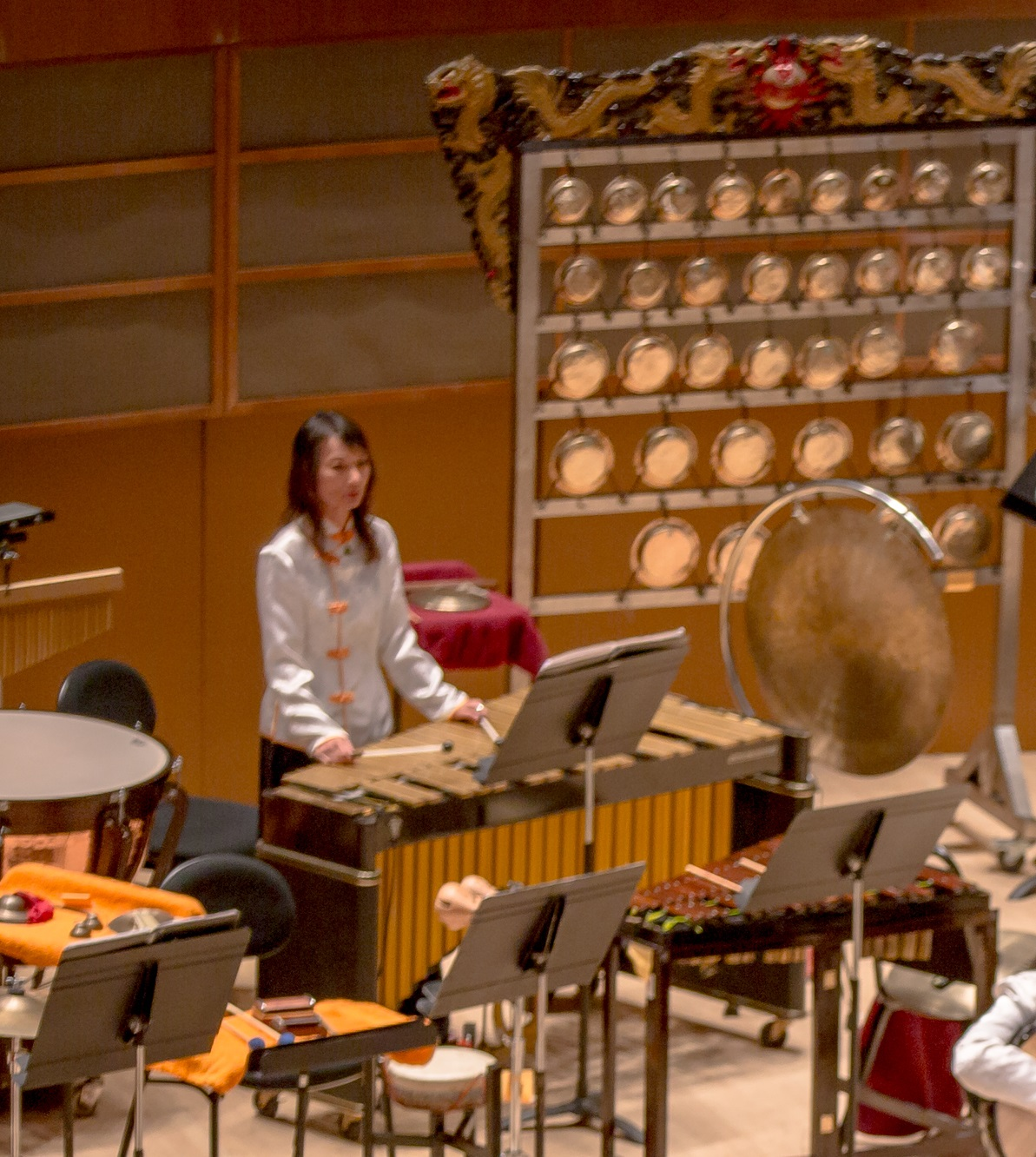
Percussion section, to the right are a large gong and a Yunluo, a group of differently-sized gongs

Like its Western counterpart, instruments used in the percussion section of the modern Chinese orchestra vary according to the musical work. The percussion section of the modern Chinese orchestra consists of two main parts: Chinese percussion and Western percussion.

More often than not, musical works written for modern Chinese orchestra incorporate a large Western percussion section, including important roles for instruments like the timpani, bass drum, snare drum, etc. More obscure instruments in orchestral context like the mark tree, vibraslap, conga, cowbell, etc. are also utilized in modern Chinese orchestra. Western percussion is considered an essential part of the Chinese orchestra percussion section.

The history of Chinese percussion instruments is longer than any other section of traditional Chinese instruments. The character of the drum was first recorded in the ancient inscriptions on oracle bones and tortoise shells dating from the Shang dynasty. At that time (1562–1066 BC) more than 50 percent of Chinese instruments were percussive in nature.

Percussion instruments produce sound through striking on the surface. Common materials used for making percussion instruments in the past were gold, rock, wood and bamboo. The more popular percussion instruments include the luo, gongs, gu (drums), bo (cymbals), and bianzhong.

Because of the richness of the timbre, sound and variety of Chinese percussion instruments, they are frequently used in Western-style musical compositions. A large gong can create a stately and imposing atmosphere; dramatic effects can be achieved with the tanggu, muyu and qing also can invoke an element of mystery.

In Chinese opera, the percussion section of the orchestra is particularly important, especially for martial scenes known as wu chang, or The player of the bangu, directs the rest of the orchestra through his different methods and positions of striking his instrument. He has control over the overall development of the action and creation of atmosphere, and is equivalent to the conductor of the Western orchestra.

==== Bangu ====
The bangu (ban, lit. flat board; gu, lit. drum) is also commonly called jing bangu (jing means Beijing opera) and danpi (single drumhead). The drum frame is constructed of thick wedges of hardwood glued together in a circle, wrapped with a metal band. Its body is bell-mouthed in shape, which opens at the bottom. Its top surface (about 25 cm), covered with a piece of pig or cow hide, has a small convex central circular opening (about 5 or 6 cm in diameter), which is called the guxin (lit. drum heart, which is the middle of the drum), the actual sounding position. The player strikes on this central area with a pair of bamboo sticks. The use of normal sticks would cause the pain of hand and the bamboos sticks used are also not commonly used.

The type used for Beijing opera and other northern Chinese musical dramas, with a smaller central striking area, has a relatively solid tone quality. In the southern gong and drum ensemble, the bangu has a larger striking area, rendering a looser and softer tone. The southern type can be used for solos with a variety of techniques and rhythms. The jing bangu is the lead instrument in the Beijing opera.

==== Bo ====
The bo (bronze cymbals) were frequently used in Sui and Tang dynasties (AD 581–907) with varying designs. Now it is commonly made of high-tin bronze.

The performer strikes the cymbals together. The most common type now is the jingbo (the prefix jing referring to Beijing, the prefix used to define the instruments in the Beijing opera). This type is clear and forceful in tone quality. It is also used in other regional opera genres and ensembles, and is one of the four major instruments (drum, large and small gongs and cymbals) in the jubilant luogu (gong and drum) music. In local operas, the luogu ensemble often accompanies acrobatic fighting.

==== Luo ====
The luo, or Chinese gong, is made of high-tin bronze, hammered into the shape of a sifter. Its central resonating area can be either flat or convex. Its long history can be traced back to the early Western Han period (206 BC-AD 24) according to an archaeological find from a tomb of that period in Guangxi. In a text dating to the Tang period (AD 618–907), it was known as the shaluo (sand gong), which is among the earlier evidence of gong usage in classical literature.

There are many varieties of gongs, each with varying tone qualities. The name is usually preceded by a prefix to specify each different kind. The largest type (over 120 cm in diameter) called dachaoluo, known for its deep and grave tone, is used in official settings like weddings, funerals and temple ceremonies. The smallest, the goujiaoluo (dog-calling gong), only 8 cm in diameter, can often be seen in theatrical ensembles in the southern parts of Fujian. Both the larger and the smaller boast distinct acoustic features, functions and performing styles. Different size and thinkness of the cymbals will affect the sound tone being produced. The da di luo (big gong) has a very deep sound in contrast to the goujiaoluo.

==== Yunluo ====
The yunluo (cloud gong) was first mentioned in historical records as yun'ao during the Yuan dynasty (1271–1368). The small gongs in a set, usually numbering up to 10 and in distinct pitches, are suspended vertically in a wooden frame. Each is attached to a cubicle within the frame, secured by cords. These gongs are all of the same diameter but vary in thickness. In terms of tuning, thicker dimensions give higher pitches, and thinner ones, lower. The instruments are struck with a small beater.

In a recently redesigned type, the number of gongs was increased, ranging from 29 to 38, and two mallets with either hard or soft tips are used for different tonal effects. One sounds loud and solid, while the other soft and drifting. Owing to the expanded range, modification in yunluo thickness cannot change the pitch of each small gong. Thus varying diameters are used for the new tones for variation.

The yunluo are mostly used in ensembles, and recently in solos as well.

==== Tanggu ====
The tanggu (hall drum) is listed as a hide instrument in the traditional bayin classification of Chinese instruments. The common type is similar in shape to a barrel. Its wooden body, entirely painted red with decorative patterns, is covered with two drumheads of cowhide or pig skin. Four lateral iron rings around the shell allow the drum to be vertically suspended in a frame. It is struck with a pair of wooden beaters. Tone quality can be modified by moving the striking point closer to the centre of the surface, with varying dynamics. Usually the different tone are not easily identified.

The tanggu is constructed mainly in two types. The larger one, with diameters of over a metre, can produce a deep and sonorous tone and the smaller, with a diameter of 20 to 30 cm, is solid and forceful in tone quality. It is traditionally used with other instruments like luo and bo in folk festivals, and in ensembles or for accompaniment as well. Types for local operas are mostly smaller, for instance, the jing tanggu in Beijing opera. Some could also be known as dagu, datanggu, xiaogu or xiaotanggu.

==== Muyu ====
The muyu (wooden fish) was used originally to accompany Buddhist chants and monks only. An account of this instrument was found in the literature of the Ming dynasty (AD 1368–1644): "The muyu is carved from a block of wood and into the shape of a fish, then its interior is hollowed out. Sounds can be produced by striking." Since the Qing dynasty (AD 1644–1911) the instrument has appeared in folk ensembles.

The muyu is mostly made of mulberry (or Chinese Toon) wood. The larger type is primarily used in Buddhist temples, but recently appears in sets, varying in diameters and tonal qualities. The set is mainly used for regular rhythms when used for accompaniment. Playing the different parts of the muyu could have different volume.

==== Bianzhong ====
The bianzhong (lit. 'collected bell') is listed as a primary metal instrument, and thus heads the metal section under the bayin classifications. Its long history dates back to the Shang dynasty (1766–1122 BC), when a set of 3 bronze bells was common, though the earlier earthenware type of the late Stone Age was unearthed in Shaanxi province. From the 5th to the 3rd century BC the number of bells increased, mostly from 9 to 13.

The largest set ever recorded was exhumed from the tomb of Marquis Yi of the State of Zeng, Zeng-hou Yi (from sometime after 433 BC) in Hubei province. This archaeological finding has become a focus of international academic attention. The bianzhong being found still have a good sound quality despite many years after it was made. The bianzhong set consists of 64 bells, hung in three layers, with the upper ones called niuzhong (bells with bronze loops for vertical suspension), while those on the two lower layers were called yongzhong (bells with handles for suspension at a slight angle). Because of the shape of the bells, two different pitches, a major or minor third apart, can be produced on any of the bells, depending on the two striking locations, which are either the frontal or the lateral. 12 semitones are found in the set, with a total range of 5 octaves.

The inscriptions on the bells unite to form a literary text on the large tone system of the bianzhong, valuable sources for the study of the musical culture in the Warring States period during the Eastern Zhou dynasty (475–221 BC). With the construction for two different pitches from a single bell and its unique casting methods, the bianzhong is one of the more unusual instruments of traditional Chinese music.

==== Lion drum ====
The size of a lion drum is very big, and is widely used for the Lion dance. There are normally 2 types, the northern Lion drum (normally in red) and southern lion drum (painted in black). It is a single-headed drum, and its large size helps to create a majestic, booming resonance upon striking of the drum head. The lion drum head is made of thick, durable goat skin, and its wooden body is normally decorated with intricate hand-drawn drawings. The sound produce by it usually sound higher key than the datanggu.

== Repertoire ==
Some of the well-known pieces for Chinese orchestra were originally composed in the 1930s until the interruption due to the Second Sino-Japanese War and Chinese Civil War, and the period from the fifties until the mid-1960s before the Cultural Revolution disrupted cultural activities. Experimental pieces were composed in the early days of Chinese orchestra, an example of the earliest compositions for the Chinese orchestra with triadic chordal progression, Spring on the Lake, was composed by Tan Xiaolin in the 1930s. Numerous compositions for a modern Chinese orchestra have been added to the repertoire since the 1980s. Such music composed generally follows the rules of traditional Chinese modal harmony, even if the music has become less pentatonic and more chromatic. One example of such modern compositions is The Great Wall Capriccio, a concerto composed in 1981 for erhu by Liu Wenjin.

Many of the popular early pieces for Chinese orchestra are based on folk music and other traditional genres. They may be originally traditional or solo pieces for Chinese instruments or written for Western orchestra, but later rearranged for a Chinese orchestra. A notable figure is Peng Xiuwen who was appointed conductor and director of Central Broadcasting Station Orchestra in 1956, and who rearranged many compositions for the Chinese orchestra. Some modern Chinese orchestras have also adapted contemporary Chinese popular songs as well as Western classical and pop music in their performances.

The following are examples of pieces written for large modern Chinese orchestra. These musical works may utilise Western musical composition techniques, as well as the inclusion of Western instruments like cello, double bass, harp and Western percussion.

This is not a complete list of all musical works written for modern Chinese orchestra.

=== Earlier pieces ===
Title	Chinese	Composers/Arrangers	Year	Note
Wild Dance of the Golden Snake	金蛇狂舞	Nie Er	1934	Based on a Kunming folk tune, "Inverted Eight Beat" (倒八板, Dao Ba Ban)
Dance of the Yao People	瑤族舞曲	Liu Tieshan (劉鐵山), Mao Yuan	1952	Originally composed for a Western orchestra
Coloured Cloud Chasing the Moon	彩雲追月	Ren Guang	1932	
Beautiful Flowers on a Full Moon	花好月圓	Huang Yijun (黄貽鈞)	1935	Later orchestral arrangement by Peng Xiuwen
Great Happiness	喜洋洋	Liu Mingyuan	1958	Based on Shanxi folk songs
Year of Good Fortune	幸福年	Liu Mingyuan	1960	Based on a traditional tune
The Purple Bamboo Tune	紫竹調			Traditional Jiangnan tune, orchestral version by Peng Xiuwen
The Moon Mirrored in the Erquan Pool	二泉映月	Abing	1930s	Later orchestral arrangement by Peng Xiuwen
Hundred Birds Pay Homage to Phoenix	百鳥朝鳳	Ren Tongxiang (任同祥)	1953	Piece for Suona often performed with orchestral accompaniment
Spring Flowers on Moonlit River	春江花月夜	Liu Yaozhang (柳堯章), Zheng Jinwen (鄭覲文)	1925	Based on an old pipa tune (夕陽簫鼓), later orchestral arrangement by Peng Xiuwen

=== Recent compositions ===
Musical works that are written for modern Chinese orchestra are influenced by the musical structures, composition techniques, music theories, etc. of Western orchestral music. These compositions include parts scored for Western instruments, such as cello, double bass, harp and Western percussion. As mentioned above, the development of the modern Chinese orchestra itself in the 20th century was based on the foundation laid by the Western symphonic orchestra.

The following are examples of famous pieces written for modern Chinese orchestra.

English Title	Chinese Title	Composer	Number of Movements	List of Movements	Elaboration
Symphony No. 2 "Ode to Peace"	第二交响曲"和平颂"	Zhao Jiping	5	I: Jinling and the Yangtze River 金陵·大江, II: The Tears of the River 江泪, III: The Sorrow of the River 江怨, IV: The Fury of the River 江怒, V: Ode to Peace 和平颂	A five-movement symphony that depicts the infamous Second Sino-Japanese War and the Nanjing Massacre.
Journey to Lhasa	拉萨行	Kuan Nai-chung 关乃忠	4	I: Potala Palace 布达拉宫, II: Yarlung Tsangpo River 雅鲁藏布江, III: Heavenly Burial 天葬, IV: Vanquishing Demons 打鬼	Composed in 1984, this four-movement symphonic suite depicts the scenery of Tibet and the culture of the Tibetan people.
Reminiscences of Yunnan	云南回忆	Liu Xing 刘星	3	I: Moderato 中庸的中板, II: Lento 呆滞的慢板, III: Allegro 机械的快板	A three-movement concerto for zhongruan and modern Chinese orchestra. Also known as "Zhongruan Concerto No. 1" (第一中阮协奏曲).
Impressions of Chinese Music	印象国乐	Jiang Ying 姜莹	3	I: 小鸟乐, II: 前世今生, III: 大曲	
A Glimpse of the Taklamakan	塔克拉玛干掠影	Jin Xiang	4	I: 漠原, II: A Lost Empire in the Desert 漠楼, III: 漠舟, IV: 漠州	This four-movement tone poem depicts the grand Taklamakan Desert in northwest China.
The Silk Road	丝绸之路	Jiang Ying 姜莹	Standalone piece		Also known as "Kumtag" (库姆塔格).
Variations of Emotion	抒情变奏曲	Liu Changyuan 刘长远	3	Unnamed movements; the three movements are simply labeled "Movement I", "Movement II", "Movement III".	This piece consists of 15 variations based on one main theme, divided into three movements.
The Yellow River Capriccio	黄河畅想	Cheng Dazhao 程大兆	Standalone piece		
Spring	春	Lu Lianghui 卢亮辉	Standalone piece		
Summer	夏	Lu Lianghui 卢亮辉	Standalone piece		
Autumn	秋	Lu Lianghui 卢亮辉	Standalone piece		
Winter	冬	Lu Lianghui 卢亮辉	Standalone piece		
The Terracotta Warriors Fantasia	秦·兵马俑幻想曲	Peng Xiuwen	Standalone piece		
Fishermen's Song of the East China Sea	東海漁歌	Gu Guanren 顾冠仁	Standalone piece		Later used in various films such as Kungfu Hustle
Impressions of the Mountain and the Sea	山海印象	Su Wenqing 苏文庆	Standalone piece		
The Age of Dragon	龙年新世纪	Kuan Nai-chung 关乃忠	4	I: The Sun 太阳, II: The Moon 月亮, III: The Stars 星辰, IV: The Land 大地	A four-movement concerto written for Chinese percussion, Western percussion and modern Chinese orchestra.
Dabo River Caprice	达勃河随想曲	He Xuntian	2	I: Adagio 柔板, II: Allegretto 小快板	Composed in 1982, this musical work depicts the exotic beauty of the Dabo River in Sichuan and the life of the Baima Tibetan people living in the area.
Three Melodies of West Yunnan	滇西土风三首	Guo Wenjing	3	I: A Va Mountain 阿佤山, II: Gino Dance 基诺舞, III: Sacrifice, Torches, Potent Liquor 祭祀·火把·烈酒	This three-movement work depicts the cultures of three different tribal groups based in western Yunnan.
Symphony No. 1 "Jinling"	第一交响曲"金陵"	Peng Xiuwen 彭修文	3	I: Remembrance of Things Past 怀古, II: The Qinhuai River 秦淮, III: Vicissitudes of Life 沧桑	This three-movement symphonic work depicts the rich history and culture of Nanjing, formerly called Jinling.
The Desert Smoke Suite	大漠孤烟直组曲	Zhao Jiping 赵季平	4	II: Seek 音诗-觅, IV: Elegy 悼歌	
Northwest Suite	西北组曲	Tan Dun	4	I: The Timely Rain Fall from High Heaven 老天爷下甘雨, II: 闹洞房, III: 想亲亲, IV: The Sidedrum in Stoneplate Form 石板腰鼓	Also known as "Northwest Suite No. 1" (西北第一组曲).
The Mohe Tribe Suite	靺鞨组曲	Liu Xijin 刘锡津	6	I: Warriors 武士, II: Princess 公主, III: 百戏童, IV: 酒舞, V: The Battle of Hualin 桦林大战, VI: 踏垂舞	
The Legend of Shadi'er	沙迪尔传奇	Liu Yuan 刘湲	Standalone piece		Also known as "The Uyghur Tone Poem" (维吾尔音诗).
The Great Wall Capriccio	长城随想	Liu Wenjin	4	I: Strolling Through the Mountain Pass 关山行, II: Beacon March 烽火操, III: Memorial for the Patriots 忠魂祭, IV: Looking Afar 遥望篇	A four-movement concerto for erhu and modern Chinese orchestra.
Empress Earth	后土	Tang Jianping 唐建平	Standalone piece		
Train Toccata	火車拖卡塔	Jiang Ying 姜莹	Standalone piece		Utilises the Western toccata form with a free and fast-paced style.
Dragons Rising, Tigers Leaping	龙腾虎跃	Li Min-xiong 李民雄	Standalone piece		Based on the Chinese idiom of the same name, the piece's main features are the percussion solos and is groundbreaking for the expansion of the Chinese percussion music genre.

== Notable Chinese orchestras ==
External videos
- Example of a Chinese Orchestra Piece
- Erhu Concerto Butterfly Lovers (梁祝) featuring erhuist Sun Huang, 2013.
- Orchestra Piece Dagger Society Suite Overture (小刀会序曲) 2018.

- China Broadcasting Chinese Orchestra
- China National Traditional Orchestra
- Ding Yi Music Company
- Firebird Youth Chinese Orchestra
- Guangdong Chinese Orchestra
- Singapore Chinese Orchestra
- Hong Kong Chinese Orchestra
- National Chinese Orchestra
- Shanghai Chinese Orchestra
- Taipei Chinese Orchestra
- Philippine Cultural College Chinese Orchestra
- Canadian Chinese Orchestra

== See also ==
- Traditional Chinese musical instruments
- Music of China
- Guoyue
