= Dabo River Caprice =

Orchestra piece composed by He Xuntian

- by Xuntian He
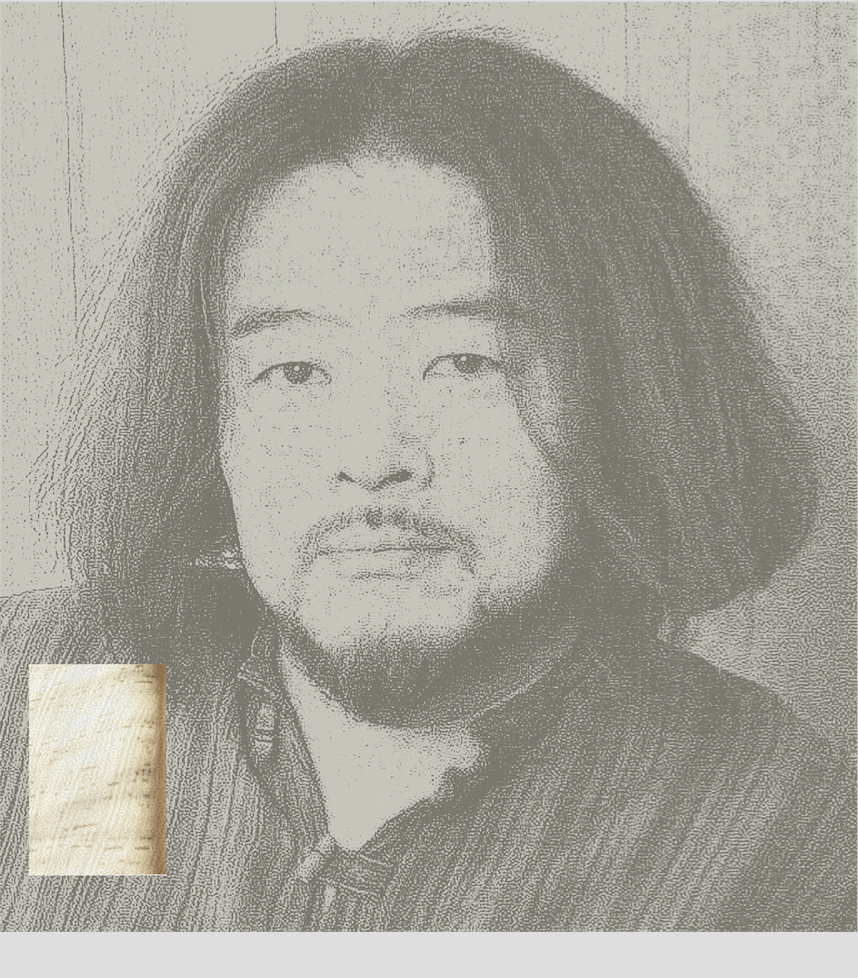
- HE XUNTIAN

Dabo River Caprice ( 达勃河随想曲 ) is a work for Chinese Orchestra, composed by He Xuntian in 1982.

== Introduction ==
This piece consists of two movement, the first being adagio and the second, allegretto. It depicts the exotic beauty of Dabo River and the joyful scene of Baima Tibetans living there. For the first time, grand chorus was included in folk orchestral music.
This piece was composed in 1982. It has won a number of prizes, including the 1st Prize in the Third National Musical Compositions Competition. It has been performed in more than ten countries around the world.

== Instrumentation ==
Dabo River Caprice is scored for the following orchestra:

Woodwinds

Bangdi (梆笛) I, II
Qudi (曲笛) I, II
Hengxiao (横箫) I, II
Gaoyin sheng (soprano sheng; 高音笙)
Zhongyin sheng (alto sheng; 中音笙)
Zhongyin guan (alto guan; 中音管)
Diyin guan (bass guan; 低音管) I, II

Plucked strings

Pipa (琵琶) I, II
Yangqin (扬琴)
Zhongruan (中阮)
Daruan (大阮)
Konghou (箜篌)

Percussion

Timpani (定音鼓)
Vibraphone (颤音琴)
Xylophone (木琴)
Tubular bells (管钟)
Suspended cymbal (吊镲)
Maracas (沙锤)
Tambourine (铃鼓)
Temple block (大木鱼)
Pengling (碰铃)
Paigu (排鼓)
Yunluo (云锣)

Voices

Folk soprano (民风女高音)
Folk tenor (民风男高音)

Bowed strings

Gaohu (高胡)
Erhu (二胡)
Zhonghu (中胡)
Gehu (革胡)
Diyingehu (bass gehu; 低音革胡)

Notably missing from the instrumentation are the suona family of instruments, the diyin sheng (bass sheng) and liuqin.

Due to the limited adoption of gehu and diyingehu, many Chinese orchestras use the cello and double bass as substitutes for these parts.

== Performance ==
Dabo River Caprice
8 February 2003, John F. Kennedy Center for the Performing Arts
China Broadcasting Chinese Orchestra
Dabo River Caprice
6 February 2003, Lincoln Center for the Performing Arts
China Broadcasting Chinese Orchestra
