= Min Huifen =

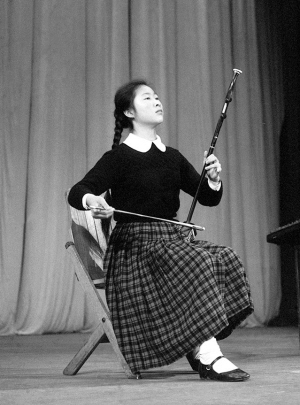
- Min Huifen playing the erhu, c. 1963

Background information
- Born: 1945; Yixing, Wuxi, Jiangsu, China
- Died: May 12, 2014 (aged 68–69) Shanghai, China
- Instrument: Erhu

Min Huifen (Chinese: 闵惠芬; 1945 – 12 May 2014) was a performer of the erhu, a traditional Chinese bowed string instrument, and a composer. She was considered the undisputed master of the instrument, nicknamed the "Queen of Erhu". She composed some of her own hits, including "Yangguan Melody – Three Variations" and "Wishes of the People of Honghu Lake." Her most famous piece was the Great Wall Capriccio, composed by Liu Wenjin with her assistance.

== Life and career ==
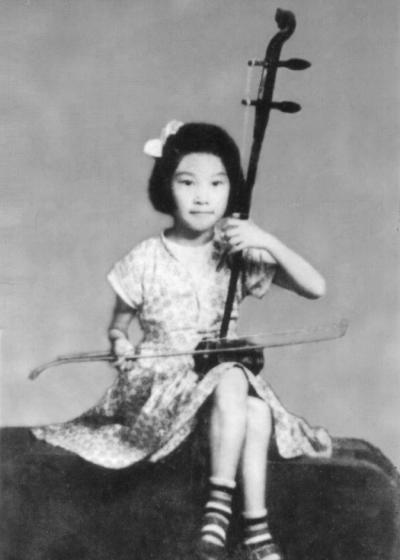
Min Huifen in her childhood

Min was born in Yixing, Jiangsu Province in 1945. Her father began teaching her to play the erhu when she was eight. She studied at the Affiliated High School of the Shanghai Conservatory of Music, and then at the Department of Traditional Chinese Music of the Conservatory. After graduation, she went to Beijing to train under Liu Mingyuan and Lan Yusong, two northern masters of erhu. Her experience made her well versed in both the southern and northern traditions of the erhu.

In 1963, she won the national prize at the Shanghai Spring Arts Festival, and was subsequently recognized as the undisputed master of erhu for more than 50 years until her death. After attending her performance in 1973, American music critic Harold Schonberg called her the "Heifetz of erhu". As a member of the Chinese art delegation, she toured the United States in 1978.

Min was a member of the China National Art Troupe, and later became the solo erhu performer of the Shanghai Art Troupe. After 1978, she performed with the Shanghai Chinese Orchestra.

In 1989, Min famously performed in support of the Tiananmen Square protests. After Beijing declared martial law on 20 May, she performed the melancholy Moon reflected on Erquan pond, for the student protesters in Shanghai supporting their Beijing colleagues.

== Works ==
Min Huifen released 15 albums during her career. Her music is a unique blend of multiple genres of traditional Chinese music, including the Peking opera, the Yue opera, and the music of Chaozhou. She composed several of her hit singles herself, including "Yangguan Melody – Three Variations" and "Wishes of the People of Honghu Lake." Her most famous performance was the Great Wall Capriccio, composed by Liu Wenjin with Min's assistance. It was inspired by a huge tapestry of the Great Wall that Liu and Min saw during their visit to the Headquarters of the United Nations in New York in 1978.

== Awards ==
- First Prize, National Erhu Playing Competition (1963)
- Shanghai Literature and Art Award (1988)
- First National Gold Record Award (1989)

== Health issues and death ==
In 1981, Min was diagnosed with cancer, and underwent six major operations and fifteen courses of chemotherapy in the next five years. Doctors thought her cancer was terminal after it metastasized in 1983, but she miraculously recovered from the disease.

However, Min still suffered from many health problems, including high blood pressure and hyperlipidemia. On 13 February 2014, she suffered a cerebral haemorrhage and fell into a coma. She never woke up again, and died on 12 May 2014 at Renji Hospital in Shanghai. She was 69.

== Family ==
Min Huifen was born to a musical family. Her father Min Jiqian (闵季骞), who outlived her, was a student of the erhu master Liu Tianhua. Her brother Min Lekang (闵乐康) is a national first-class conductor and music professor. Her younger sister, Min Xiaofen, is a well known pipa player. According to Min Lekang, who was more than ten years younger than Min Huifen, she taught her younger siblings the erhu and musical theory and had a significant impact on their careers. Her son, Liu Ju (刘炬), is also a well-known conductor.
