= Twenty Years a Dream =

- Short story by Pu Songling
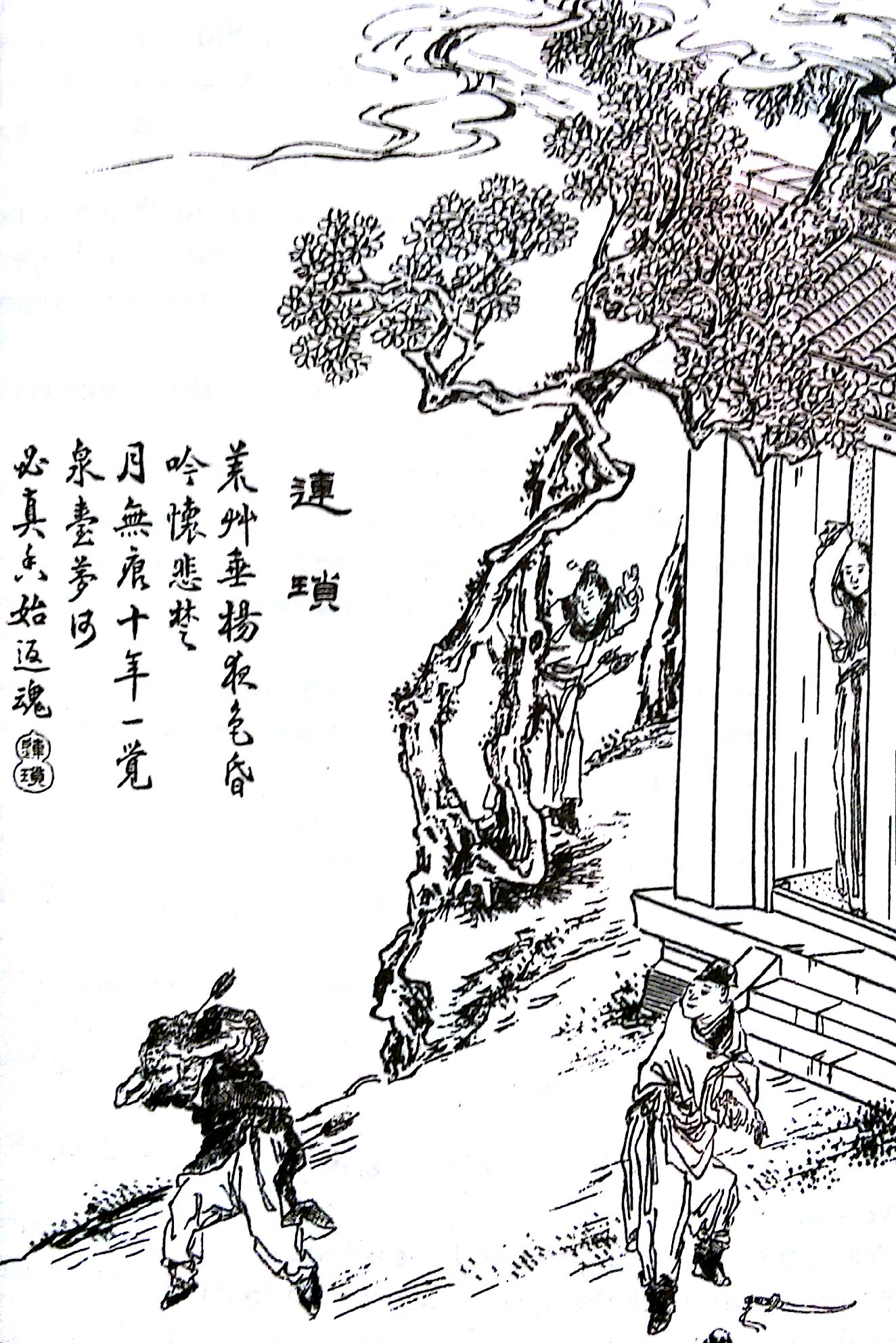
- 19th-century illustration from Xiangzhu liaozhai zhiyi tuyong (Liaozhai Zhiyi with commentary and illustrations; 1886)
- Original title: 連瑣 (Liansuo)
- Translator: John Minford
- Country: China
- Language: Chinese
- Genre: Chuanqi

Publication
- Published in: Strange Stories from a Chinese Studio
- Publication type: Anthology
- Publication date: c. 1740
- Published in English: 2006

Chronology
Fushi (负尸)	Shan, the Daoist Priest (单道士)

"Twenty Years a Dream" (simplified Chinese: 连琐; traditional Chinese: 連瑣; pinyin: Liánsuǒ; lit. 'Locket') is a short story written by Chinese author Pu Songling in Strange Stories from a Chinese Studio (1740). One of the earlier entries in the collection, it revolves around a bachelor's romantic relations with a female ghost. The story was favourably received by literary critics.

== Plot ==
Yang Yuwei (杨于畏), a bachelor who resides in a derelict apartment next to a cemetery, is visited by a female ghost one night. She introduces herself as Locket (连琐), a Gansu local who died of sickness in her teenage years some twenty years ago, and is now fated to live as a desolate soul. Yang immediately takes a liking to her and they strike a friendship. However, she warns him to never reveal her existence to anybody else. On a daily basis, Locket spends the night with Yang, teaching him how to play either Go or the liuqin, and vanishes by cock-crow.

Gradually, Yang's behaviour changes; his friends notice this and quickly learn of Locket, thanks to her signature on a poem she wrote for Yang. They demand to meet her and behave rowdily while attempting to lure out the ghost. Infuriated and disappointed, Locket severs her ties with a hapless Yang. She backtracks on this a month later, however, when she returns to Yang and beseeches him to help her – a "vile monster" wishes for her to be his concubine against her wishes. Yang readily agrees to defend her; the following day, he dreams of a hideous being "with bristling moustaches, wearing a red hat and a black gown" attacking him and Locket. They are saved when his friend Wang, who had previously wished to meet Locket, passes by and slays the creature with his bow and arrow.

Yang wakes up and corresponds with Wang to learn that he had a similar dream. Locket confirms that the events of the dream were in fact real, and presents Wang with her father's dagger as a token of appreciation. Locket then informs Yang that for her to be resurrected, she requires "the seed and blood of a living man", to which he gladly obliges. She tells him to dig up her grave a hundred days later; Yang dutifully carries this out and finds her in the coffin, living and breathing. Locket exclaims, "Those twenty years were like a dream."

== Background ==
"Twenty Years a Dream" is believed to be one of the earlier entries Pu wrote for Strange Tales from a Chinese Studio (Liaozhai). As Allan Barr observes in his Comparative Studies of Early and Late Tales in Liaozhai Zhiyi, "earlier stories tend to focus more on love and sex and later stories on social satire." The overarching message of the story is an inversion of the oft-repeated adage "life is but a dream"; rather than sticking to convention, Pu writes of death being like a dream, "replete with all the elegiac associations of dream as a metaphor for a vanished past." Pu also makes a handful of cultural references, including to Yang Guifei's breasts ("lotus kernels") and Yuan Zhen's ballad The Lianchang Palace (連昌宮).

== Reception ==
The story was well received by literary critics. Early commentators like Wang Shizhen (王士禎) and Dan Minglun (但明倫) were in praise of the story's ending in particular, which they described as "marvellous" and "like hearing the sound of celestial music suddenly cease" respectively. Feng Zhenluan (冯镇峦) remarked that the "whole story is ... fragmentary, inconclusive, loose, delicate, exquisite." Zhang Zhenjun compared the protagonist Locket to Lin Daiyu of Dream of the Red Chamber, while lauding Pu's characterisation.
