= Taipei Chinese Orchestra =

- Chinese orchestra
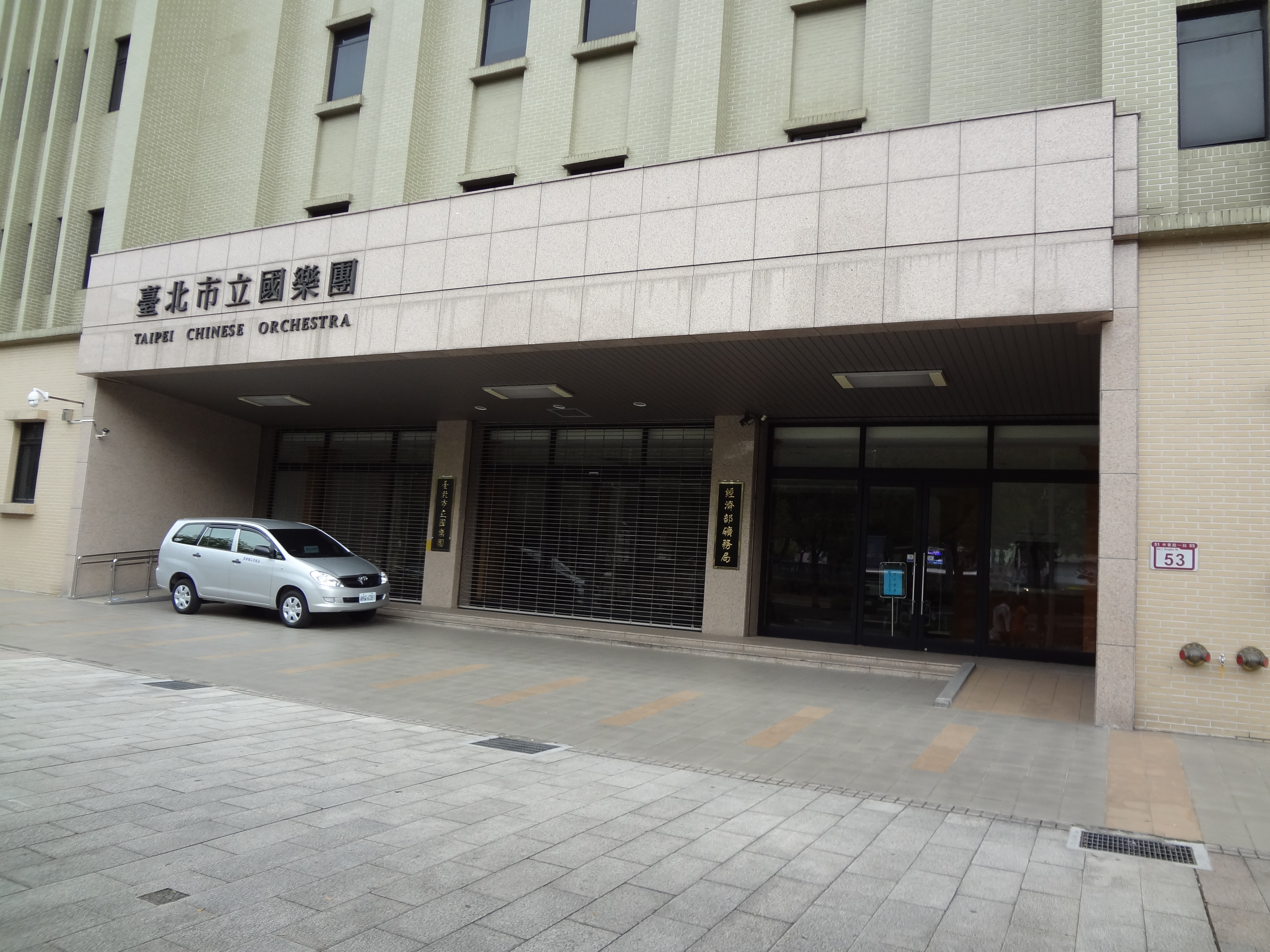
- Native name: 臺北市立國樂團
- Short name: TCO
- Founded: 1979
- Location: Zhongzheng, Taipei, Taiwan
- Principal conductor: Qu Chunquan
- Website: www.tco.gov.tw

The Taipei Chinese Orchestra (TCO; Chinese: 臺北市立國樂團; pinyin: Táiběishì Lìguó Yuètuán) is a Chinese orchestra based in Zhongzheng District, Taipei, Taiwan, as the first professional ensemble of its kind in Taiwan.

== History ==
In 1979, Taipei Chinese Orchestra was founded by Taipei City Government.

On 6 November 1999, the Taipei City Government established the Department of Cultural Affairs, so the Taipei Chinese Orchestra then belonged to Department of Cultural Affairs, Taipei City Government.

== See also ==
- List of symphony orchestras in Taiwan
