= Dance of the Yao People =

1952 musical composition by Liu Tieshan & Mao Yuan

"Dance of the Yao People" (simplified Chinese: 瑶族舞曲; traditional Chinese: 瑤族舞曲; pinyin: Yáozú wǔqǔ), also known as "Dance of the Yao Tribe", is a Chinese orchestral piece by Liu Tieshan and Mao Yuan. It is based on music that Liu wrote after visiting Liannan Yao Autonomous County, Guangdong, in 1951, after being inspired by the long drum dance, a form of traditional festival music of the Yao people of southern and southwest China, and Mao orchestrated it for Western orchestra in 1952. An arrangement for Chinese orchestra by Peng Xiuwen in 1954 made it popular across China. The piece has been performed by Chinese and Western orchestras for decades, including at the Musikverein in Vienna.

== History ==
=== Origins ===
In 1951, the composer Liu Tieshan, a teacher at the Central Conservatory of Music, travelled with several students to southern China to collect folk songs. According to the Southern Daily, he travelled as a member of a central government delegation visiting ethnic minority areas. At Youling village in Liannan Yao Autonomous County, in northern Guangdong, he watched the Yao people, an ethnic minority of southern China, sing and dance at a festival. The Yao long drum dance is a festive dance of Yao communities in Guangdong, Guangxi and Hunan, performed with a waisted drum whose two goatskin heads are joined by a narrow middle. It is danced at festivals, harvests, housewarmings and weddings, and it developed from rites honouring the Yao ancestor King Pan. Liu drew on the music and dance he saw to write the song "Long Drum Dance of the Yao People".

=== Orchestration ===
Liu's colleague Mao Yuan, a composer at the Central Opera House, orchestrated the song for Western orchestra in 1952 and named it "Dance of the Yao Tribe". According to the Beijing Evening News, Mao watched a Yao long drum dance at a national ethnic arts festival in 1952 and found its music simple but appealing. The newspaper reported that he rewrote and arranged the music so that any orchestra in China or abroad could perform it. A 2023 study of the score's versions by Suo Yuhan dates the orchestral original to 1953.

=== Arrangements for Chinese orchestra ===
The ethnomusicologist Ming-yen Lee classes the piece as a "transplant", a work written for Western orchestra and later adapted for Chinese orchestra during the first period of Mao Zedong's rule from 1949 to 1966. Lee describes transplants as one of the ways composers tried to make Western styles work in a Chinese way. Peng Xiuwen arranged the piece for Chinese orchestra in 1954, and this version made it popular across China.

Suo identifies several versions of the Chinese orchestra score. An undated internal score for the Central Song and Dance Ensemble, made after 1953, is credited to Peng and Qin Pengzhang. Qin had helped form the ensemble's folk orchestra in 1952 and became its conductor in 1953. Peng, who became director of the China Broadcasting Chinese Orchestra in 1956, orchestrated a broadcast version between 1954 and 1956. The orchestra had been founded in 1953, and in 1954 it began a systematic reorganisation of its instrument sections known as "serialisation". Suo argues that these instrument reforms shaped the orchestration of each version. The Music Publishing House issued a full score in numbered musical notation in 1962. Peng re-orchestrated the piece for large Chinese orchestra in 1978, and the People's Music Publishing House first published this full score in August 1980. The versions largely follow the four-part framework of the original.

=== Other arrangements ===
In 1980, Yeh Shu-Han arranged the piece for concert band during a tour of the United States with the C.Y.C. Youth Band. The arrangement, titled "A Legend From Yao", is published by Editions Robert Martin. The music publisher HeBu describes it as one of the most popular band pieces in Taiwan.

== Music ==
Naxos, which publishes the orchestral score, describes the piece as a dance suite depicting a festival of the Yao people. In a programme note for the Los Angeles Philharmonic, John Henken described it as a multi-sectional medley that moves from a yearning song to an energetic dance.

The piece opens at nightfall, as villagers gather under the moon with their long drums. Gentle strings present the main theme, which evokes a young woman dancing. As more dancers join, the bassoon and oboe introduce a forceful melody derived from the main theme, depicting young men rushing into the dance. The middle section, in triple metre, alternates singing lines with bouncing rhythms to suggest a young couple in love. In the Minnesota Orchestra's programme notes, two trumpets convey the jubilation of this section, which ends with a gentle solo violin melody. The final section returns to the opening material and builds to a climax for the full orchestra.

The orchestral score calls for two flutes and piccolo, two oboes, two clarinets, two bassoons, four horns, two trumpets, two trombones, timpani, percussion and strings. The percussion section includes glockenspiel, xylophone, small cymbal, small Chinese gong, tam-tam and Chinese drums. The Los Angeles Philharmonic gives a duration of about five minutes, while the Minnesota Orchestra gives about eight minutes.

== Performances and reception ==
The Beijing Evening News wrote that "Dance of the Yao People" and the violin piece "Joy of Spring" are the best known of Mao's works. It described both as works for Western instruments with a distinctly Chinese ethnic character. Chinese and Western orchestras have performed the piece for decades. The conductor Zheng Xiaoying wrote that she had conducted it too many times to count. In 1991, Mao conducted the piece at Tsinghua University's 80th anniversary celebrations. Xinhua reported in 2025 that it is often performed at the Great Hall of the People, the National Centre for the Performing Arts and the Golden Hall of the Musikverein in Vienna. Western orchestras have programmed it for Lunar New Year concerts, including the Los Angeles Philharmonic in February 2019 and the Minnesota Orchestra under Junping Qian on 28 January 2023.

A 2012 report in the Southern Daily described Liannan as the hometown of the piece. In 2008, the Yao long drum dance of Liannan was added to China's national list of intangible cultural heritage.

== Recordings ==
| Year | Album | Performers | Label | Ref. |
|---|---|---|---|---|
| 1981 | Phases of the Moon | China Broadcasting Chinese Orchestra, Peng Xiuwen | CBS Masterworks (M 36705) | |
| 2015 | Ka Ta Mei Ling: Popular Chinese Orchestral Music | Nagoya Philharmonic Orchestra, Kek-Tjiang Lim | Marco Polo (8.225808) | |

== In popular culture ==
The piece was used in The Way of the Exploding Fist, a 1985 Commodore 64 game developed by Beam Software and published by Melbourne House.

== See also ==
- Dance of the Yi People
