= Dance of the Yi People =

Dance of the Yi People (simplified: 彝族舞曲; traditional: 彞族舞曲; pinyin: Yízú Wǔqǔ; sometimes also called Dance of the Yi Tribe or Yi Dance) is one of the most popular solo compositions for the pipa, a four-stringed pear-shaped fretted lute used as one of the primary traditional musical instruments of China. Unlike the martial-sounding Ambushed From All Sides (十面埋伏; pinyin: Shí Mìan Maí Fú), the other most widely performed solo pipa piece, Dance of the Yi People is predominantly lyrical in character.

Dance of the Yi People was composed in the 1960s by the Chinese composer Wang Huiran (王惠然; b. 1936), presumably based on traditional music of the Yi people of southern China.

As with many Chinese compositions for traditional instruments, in the late 20th century Dance of the Yi People was also remade into a Chinese popular song entitled "999 Roses" (九百九十九朵玫瑰), sung by Samuel Tai (邰正宵; pinyin: Tái Zhèngxiāo).^{videos} In Vietnam, Lương Bằng Vinh remade into a song entitled "Đắng cay".

== See also ==
- Dance of the Yao People
