= Firebird Youth Chinese Orchestra =

American cultural heritage group

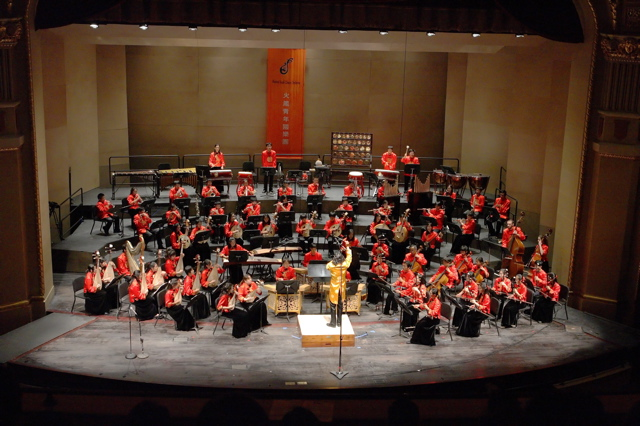
- FYCO Performing at California Theatre
- Short name: FYCO
- Founded: 2000
- Location: San Jose, California, USA
- Concert hall: California Theatre
- Principal conductor: Gordon Lee
- Website: fyco.org

Firebird Youth Chinese Orchestra (FYCO) is a cultural heritage group providing traditional instrumental music performances mainly in San Francisco Bay Area. FYCO is a subordinate of Aimusic.us, a government awarded institution.

== History ==
FYCO was founded in 2000 by Gordon Lee along with thirteen musicians. FYCO currently has five groups, freshmen, sophomores, juniors, seniors, and FYCO, with about one hundred musicians playing traditional Chinese instruments. Most of them are American born Chinese youths ranging from nine to seventeen years of age.

In the past few years, FYCO's concerts have received praises from audiences, including arts organization observers. Arts Council Silicon Valley describes FYCO as a "local treasure." The National Endowment for the Arts (NEA) declared FYCO as "one of the very few ensembles in the United States dedicated to educating young people, their families and communities through traditional Chinese music, and is carrying out its mission with great success."

== Goals ==
FYCO's mission is to promote Chinese music as an integral part of Chinese-American culture by training young musicians to play traditional instruments, thereby strengthening the Chinese community and enhancing the cultural diversity and richness of American society. FYCO has been awarded grants by government arts agencies and foundations, and been featured on newspapers, magazines, radio and television stations, including CCTV (China Central Television), Hong Kong Phoenix TV, KTSF (CH26), KICU (CH36), NBC, and KQED-TV (CH9).

== Cultural exchanges ==
In 2004, FYCO was invited by the Ministry of Culture of the People's Republic of China to visit three of China's top conservatories of music, and they performed joint concerts with each of the conservatories. FYCO is the first Chinese orchestra from Western countries to perform in China.

In July 2013, FYCO visited Taiwan on their second cultural exchange. They performed in the 2013 Hsinchu Chinese Music Festival, as well as joint performances with local orchestras, and visited schools in Taiwan.

In July 2016, FYCO visited Yunnan on a cultural exchange tour. They performed joint concerts with local orchestras and colleges, and visited schools and art institutes in Yunnan.
