= Lan Huahua =

Chinese folk song

"Lan Huahua" (simplified Chinese: 蓝花花/兰花花; traditional Chinese: 藍花花/蘭花花; pinyin: Lán Huāhuā) is a folk song from northern Shaanxi in China. The song tells of a rebellious woman named Lan Huahua who, forced into an arranged marriage, chooses to break with convention and runs away with her lover. In other versions of the story, she commits suicide. The song became highly popular in the People's Republic of China era where she was portrayed as a symbol of class struggle, and the story of the song has been retold in poems, novels, musical dramas and television shows.

== Background ==
=== Origin ===
The 20-stanza version of "Lan Huahua" in the anthology Selection of northern Shaanxi folk songs

"Lan Huahua" is a folk song from northern Shaanxi, and popular in western Shanxi, northern Shaanxi, and Eastern Gansu. There are no records of the song before the 20th century, but a line in the lyrics refers to "13 provinces", taken to mean the whole of China, suggesting that the song may have its origin during the Ming dynasty when the country was organized into 13 provinces and two capital regions (North and South Zhili). Another suggestion is that the song comes from the Republic of China era – Lan Huahua was said to be real person who fell in love with a member of the Red Army that had moved into Yan'an. In this story, the soldier wrote the song in her memory after she was forced into marriage to someone else and later died.

The song was collected from various places in Shaaxi including Gulin, Yan'an, and Suide, and it was included in the 1945 anthology Selection of northern Shaanxi folk songs (陝北民歌選) from the Lu Xun Academy.

=== Content ===
The full version published in Selection of northern Shaanxi folk songs has 20 stanzas, which are arranged into 3 sections.

The first section tells of the birth of Lan Huahua, how she was the best of all the girls in 13 provinces, and her marriage into the Zhou family. The middle section tells of Lan Huahua running away from her marriage and her relationship with her lover, while the final short section tells of the end of the relationship, with Lan noting how many friends there could be in the world.

=== Variations ===
There are a number of different versions of the song. A shorter version is based on stanzas 1, 2, 4, 5, 7, 8, 11, and partially of 13 of the longer version published in 1945. This version removes mentions of her flirtatiousness and sexuality, and it ends with Lan running away to be with her lover. This version was recorded by Guo Lanying. Another version popular in the 21st century has been further sanitized, removing the mention of her marriage to the landlord.

In another version of the story, Lan Huahua dies by suicide.

== Lyrics ==
There are a number of different versions of the song. The version given below is a shortened popular version, which also exists with some minor variations in its lyrics.

蓝花花
青线线那个蓝线线，蓝格英英的采，
生下一个蓝花花，实实的爱死人。

五谷里的那个田苗子，唯有高粱高，
一十三省的女儿呦，唯有那个蓝花花好。

正月里那个说媒，二月里订，
三月里交大钱，四月里迎。

三班子吹来，两班子打，
撇下我的情哥哥呀，抬进了周家。

蓝花花那个下轿来，东望西又照，
照见周家的猴老子，好像那一座坟。

你要死来，你早早价死，
前晌你死来，后晌我蓝花花走。

手提上那个羊肉，怀里揣上糕，
拼上那个性命，我往哥哥家里跑。

我见到我的情哥哥呀，有说不完的话呀，
咱们两个死活哟常在一搭！

Translation:

Lan Huahua
Threads of black and threads of blue, bluer than blue,
Lan Huahua is born, and she is truly loved.

Five grains sprout in the fields, the tallest of them is the sorghum,
Of all the girls in 13 provinces, the best of them is Lan Huahua.

First month of the year, comes the matchmaker; second month, the match is agreed,
Third month, a fortune is handed over; fourth month, they welcome the bride.

Three bands of musicians blow their pipes, two bands beat their drums,
My beloved is cast aside, I am carried into the Zhou household.

Lan Huahua stepped down from the sedan chair, looking right and gazing left,
Gazing upon the monkey-faced old man, looking like a tomb.

"You need to die, and die quickly,
In the morning your death comes, in the afternoon I, Lan Huahua, leave."

In my hand I hold lamb meat, in my arm I hold a cake,
I risk my life to run to my beloved's home.

I see my beloved, there is so much I have to say to him.
The two of us will be together forever, in life and in death!

== Adaptations ==
The story of Lan Huahua has been retold many times in a variety of forms. An illustrated poem of the story was published in 1959, and a musical was produced in 1978, which was then adapted into a TV miniseries in 1985.

Musically, it has been adapted into a narrative piece for erhu titled Narrative Song of Lan Huahua (兰花花叙事曲) by Guan Ming in 1986. The first section of this piece is based on the tune of the song. The story has also been adapted into an opera Lan Huahua by composer Zhang Qianyi and librettist Zhao Daming for the National Centre for the Performing Arts, which premiered in 2017.
