= Guangdong Chinese Orchestra =

The Guangdong Chinese Orchestra (pinyin: Guǎngdōng Mínzú Yuètuán; Chinese: 广东民族乐团) is a large orchestra of traditional Chinese musical instruments, based in Guangzhou, Guangdong.

Many of the works the orchestra performs are based on the traditional musics of Guangdong and Guangxi, including Chaozhou and Han opera music.

At the 10th Guangdong Art Festival in 2008, the orchestra won two first prizes, in the Music Award and Performance Award categories. In early 2009 it gave a concert tour in five European nations.

It has released several recordings.
