= Paigu =

Pitched membranophone

The Chinese paigu (排鼓; pinyin: páigǔ; also spelled pai gu) is a set of three to seven tuned drums (in most instances five are used), traditionally made of wood with animal skin heads. It is played by beating the heads (and sometimes also the body) with sticks. Most drums are double-sided and tunable. Both sides have different tunings. Tuning is done through the use of Allen keys.
