= China Broadcasting Chinese Orchestra =

The China Broadcasting Chinese Orchestra (Chinese: 中国广播民族乐团; also called Central Broadcasting Traditional Instruments Orchestra) is a major Chinese orchestra based in Beijing, comprising a large group of traditional Chinese musical instruments. It is a consolidation of the Chinese Film Orchestra Chinese Music Orchestra (中国电影乐团民族乐团), which was founded in 1949, and the original China Broadcasting Chinese Orchestra (中国广播民族乐团), which was founded in 1953. They came to the United States under the auspices of the Chinese Music Society of North America.

Its most famous conductor was Peng Xiuwen. Recordings by the Orchestra of pieces such as "Dance of the Yao People," "Purple Bamboo Melody," "The Moon Reflected in Two Springs," "The Moon On High," "Days of Emancipation," "Dancing in the Moonlight," and "Spring on a Moonlit River" were disseminated widely throughout China and are still widely known, and a compilation of the orchestra's music entitled Phases of the Moon: Traditional Chinese Music, produced by the China Record Company and released by CBS in 1981, was one of the first and best known recordings of Chinese music in the West. Succeeding Peng Xiuwen in 1997 as the orchestra's conductor was Peng Jiapeng (彭家鹏, b. 1965).

The orchestra originally had over 70 members (including a group singing folk songs) but has now 96 members. The orchestra's musicians utilize more than 30 types of traditional and modernized Chinese instruments as well as cello- and double bass-like instruments called laruan and dalaruan. Since 1957, it has performed overseas in the USSR, Czechoslovakia, Bulgaria, Romania, Yugoslavia, Albania, East Germany, Italy, Japan, and Malta.
