= Peng Xiuwen =

Chinese conductor and composer

Peng Xiuwen (Chinese: 彭修文; pinyin: Péng Xiūwén; 7 February 1931 – 28 December 1996) was a noted Chinese conductor and composer. He was a native of Wuhan, Hubei province, in central China.

Peng learned to play the erhu beginning at age seven. In 1956, he became the conductor and director of China Broadcasting Chinese Orchestra, an orchestra of Chinese traditional (and modernized traditional) instruments, based in Beijing.

Peng Xiuwen arranged numerous traditional music pieces for the Chinese orchestra. Among these is a piece of orchestral music inspired by Tang dynasty poet Zhang Ruoxu's famous poem "Spring River in the Flower Moon Night" (Chun Jiang Hua Yue Ye, 春江花月夜) first written by Liu Yaozhang (柳堯章) in 1925 based on an older tune for pipa. It has since entered the classical repertoire for the traditional Chinese instrument guzheng. He also adapted music pieces originally written for a Western orchestra to be played in a Chinese orchestra, such as Dance of the Yao People, as well as Bizet's Carmen suite.
