= Mao Yuan =

Chinese composer (1926–2022)

- 茅沅
- Born: 1926; Beijing, China
- Died: 10 October 2022 (aged 96)
- Education: Tsinghua University
- Occupation: Composer
- Employer: Central Opera House
- Known for: "Dance of the Yao People" "Joy of Spring"
- Spouse: Li Keyu

Mao Yuan (Chinese: 茅沅; pinyin: Máo Yuán; 1926 – 10 October 2022) was a Chinese composer who worked at the Central Opera House from 1951. He is best known for the orchestral piece "Dance of the Yao People", which he orchestrated in 1952 from music by Liu Tieshan, and for the violin piece "Joy of Spring". He also wrote operas and dance dramas, the score of the ballet Zheng Banqiao for the Houston Ballet, and choral works.

== Early life and education ==
Mao was born in 1926 in Beijing. Although he had loved music since childhood, he chose to study science after secondary school because he doubted that music could earn him a living. In 1945, he entered the chemistry department of Fu Jen University, and after Tsinghua University reopened following the war, he transferred there in 1946, studying first electrical engineering and then civil engineering. He graduated from the civil engineering department in 1950.

Tsinghua had no music department, but its music room, led by the adviser Zhang Xiaohu, ran a military band, an orchestra, a choir and a Chinese folk music ensemble. Mao joined the military band and was taught by Zhang and the pianist Yao Jinxin. Under Zhang's influence, he took part in conducting, piano accompaniment and arranging music for choir and military band. He was the soloist when the student orchestra performed Mozart's Piano Concerto No. 23. In 1949, after the wind instructor Liu Guangya left, Mao temporarily conducted the military band. He also helped found a student music society, whose members met weekly at the home of Robert Winter, a professor of Western languages, to hear him play and explain records, and Mao later wrote that much of his musical knowledge came from these sessions.

== Career ==
=== "Dance of the Yao People" and "Joy of Spring" ===
In 1951, Mao joined the Central Opera House, where he began working as a professional musician. That year, the composer Liu Tieshan, a teacher at the Central Conservatory of Music, visited Youling village in Liannan Yao Autonomous County, Guangdong, to collect folk music, and he wrote a piece based on the long drum dance of the Yao people. Mao, a colleague of Liu, orchestrated the piece for Western orchestra in 1952 and named it "Dance of the Yao Tribe". According to the Beijing Evening News, Mao encountered the long drum dance at a national folk arts festival in 1952 and rewrote its music for Western orchestra. In a programme note for the Los Angeles Philharmonic, John Henken described the work as a multi-sectional medley that moves from a yearning song to an energetic dance.

The piece, credited to both Liu and Mao, made Mao's name. The conductor Zheng Xiaoying said that she had conducted it more times than she could count. It was also used in the soundtrack of the 1980s video game The Way of the Exploding Fist.

Mao's violin piece "Joy of Spring" (Xinchun le) is based on a Hebei folk song about selling dumplings, to which he added technical passages and variations. It became one of the first pieces learned by many violin students. The two works, both written for Western instruments, have continued to be performed by Chinese and Western orchestras for decades.

=== Stage works and teaching ===
Mao's works for the stage include the operas Liu Hulan, The Great Wall of the South China Sea (Nanhai changcheng) and Wang Zhaojun, and the dance dramas Rather Die Than Surrender (Ning si bu qu) and The Story of Dunhuang (Dunhuang de gushi). In the late 1980s, he also taught harmony part-time at several music schools.

=== Zheng Banqiao ===
In 1981, the choreographer Ben Stevenson of the Houston Ballet proposed a ballet on a Chinese theme to the Center for US-China Arts Exchange, and the composer Chou Wen-chung introduced him to three collaborators, Mao, the costume designer Li Keyu and the conductor Chen Xieyang. They based the ballet on the 18th-century painter Zheng Banqiao, who was known for his paintings of bamboo. Mao wrote the score for Western instruments, and Chen said that it still carried the essence of ancient Chinese culture. The ballet, Zheng Banqiao, was staged in 1982 and premiered in Houston to critical acclaim, with Li Cunxin in the title role.

=== Later work ===
In 1991, at Tsinghua's 80th anniversary celebrations, Mao conducted the university orchestra in "Dance of the Yao People". In a 2008 memoir published by the university, he wrote that he had achieved little in music, which he attributed to political campaigns and his own lack of diligence. His choral works include versions of "Purple Bamboo Melody", "Farewell", "One World, One Dream" and "Dedication of Love".

In March 2016, Mao visited Tsinghua to discuss a performance of "Toward Victory", a march written by the student Wang Shengyu in 1949, at the university's 105th anniversary celebrations, and he donated old photographs of the military band to the university library. During the visit, he described music as his "oldest friend" and said that he had benefited from it all his life.

== Death ==
Mao died on the evening of 10 October 2022, at the age of 96. Zheng Xiaoying announced his death two days later and described him as an old friend and colleague. In accordance with his wishes, his body was donated to Peking Union Medical College and no memorial activities were held.

== Personal life ==
Mao was married to Li Keyu, a ballet costume designer who had studied painting under Wu Zuoren and Ye Qianyu and who designed the costumes for Zheng Banqiao.

== Works ==
| Title | Chinese title | Genre | Notes | Ref. |
|---|---|---|---|---|
| "Dance of the Yao People" | 瑶族舞曲 | Orchestral | 1952, with Liu Tieshan | |
| "Joy of Spring" (Xinchun le) | 新春乐 | Violin | Based on a Hebei folk song | |
| Liu Hulan | 刘胡兰 | Opera | | |
| The Great Wall of the South China Sea (Nanhai changcheng) | 南海长城 | Opera | | |
| Wang Zhaojun | 王昭君 | Opera | | |
| Rather Die Than Surrender (Ning si bu qu) | 宁死不屈 | Dance drama | | |
| The Story of Dunhuang (Dunhuang de gushi) | 敦煌的故事 | Dance drama | | |
| Zheng Banqiao | | Ballet | 1982, for the Houston Ballet | |
| "Purple Bamboo Melody" | 紫竹调 | Choral | | |
| "Farewell" | 送别 | Choral | | |
| "One World, One Dream" | 同一个世界同一个梦想 | Choral | | |
| "Dedication of Love" | 爱的奉献 | Choral | | |

== Discography ==
=== Recordings ===
| Year | Album | Work | Performers | Label | Ref. |
|---|---|---|---|---|---|
| 1981 | Phases of the Moon: Traditional Chinese Music | "Dance of the Yao People" | Various Chinese orchestras | CBS Masterworks (M 36705) | |
| 2015 | Ka Ta Mei Ling: Popular Chinese Orchestral Music | "Dance of the Yao People" | Nagoya Philharmonic Orchestra, Kek-Tjiang Lim | Marco Polo (8.225808) | |
| 2016 | Popular Chinese Violin Pieces | "Joy of Spring" (violin and piano version, credited to "Yuen Mao") | Takako Nishizaki (violin), Yit Kin Seow (piano) | Marco Polo (8.225833) | |

=== Published scores ===
| Title | Scoring | Publisher | Ref. |
|---|---|---|---|
| Dance of the Yao Tribe, with Liu Tieshan | Full score for orchestra | Naxos Sheet Music (NXP043) | |
| A Legend from Yao, arranged by Yeh Shu-Han in 1980 | Concert band | Editions Robert Martin | |
