= Liuqin =

Four or five stringed Chinese mandolin

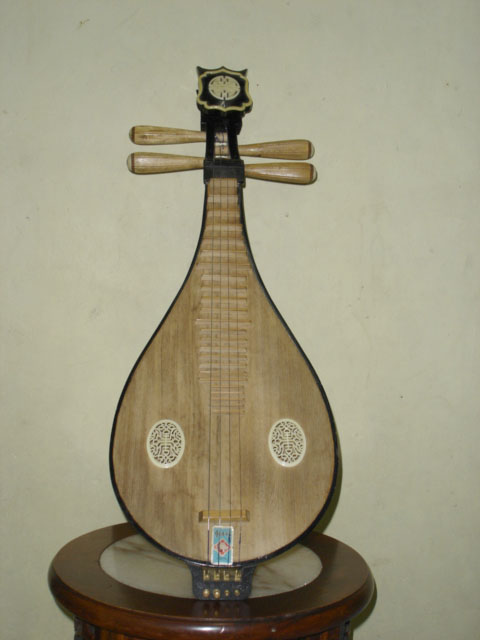
- Classification: Plucked string instrument

Related instruments
- Pipa; Ruan; Yueqin

Liuqin
- Chinese: 柳琴
Transcriptions
Standard Mandarin
- Hanyu Pinyin: liǔqín
- Yale Romanization: lyǒu-chín
Yue: Cantonese
- Yale Romanization: láuhkàhm
- Jyutping: lau5 kam4

Alternative Chinese name
- Chinese: 柳葉琴
Transcriptions
Standard Mandarin
- Hanyu Pinyin: liǔyèqín
- Yale Romanization: lyǒu-yè-chín

Second alternative Chinese name
- Chinese: 土琵琶
Transcriptions
Standard Mandarin
- Hanyu Pinyin: tǔpípá
- Yale Romanization: tǔ-pí-pā

The liuqin (Chinese: 柳琴; pinyin: liǔqín) is a three, four or five-stringed Chinese mandolin with a pear-shaped body. The range of its voice is much higher than other Chinese plucked string instruments, and it is used in both orchestral music and solo pieces in Chinese music. This has been the result of a modernization in its usage in recent years, leading to a gradual elevation in status of the liuqin from an accompaniment instrument in folk Chinese opera, to an instrument known for its unique tonal and acoustic qualities. The instrument is held diagonally like the Chinese ruan and yueqin. Its strings are elevated by a bridge and the soundboard has two prominent soundholes. Finally, the instrument is played with a pick with similar technique to both ruan and yueqin. Therefore, the liuqin is most commonly played and doubled by those with ruan and yueqin experience.

Historically, the liuqin was commonly made of willow wood (柳; liǔ literally meaning "willow"), while professional players used versions constructed with a higher-quality red sandalwood or rosewood. In contemporary versions, however, the front board is made of tong wood (桐木) and red sandalwood is used for the back.

== History ==
The liuqin has gone by various names, firstly the liuyeqin (柳葉琴), meaning willow leaf-shaped instrument. This was the original term for the liuqin, which is an abbreviation of the term liuyeqin. The other reference to the liuqin is the tu pipa (土琵琶), literally meaning unrefined pipa, because of the diminutive size and resemblance of the liuqin to the pipa.

Throughout its history, the liuqin came in variations ranging from two (which only had a range of one and a half octaves) to four strings. However, the earliest precursor of the modern four-stringed version of the instrument appeared and experienced popularity during the Qing dynasty. This version had two strings, and was only used for accompaniment purposes in traditional operas.

The two-stringed liuqin remained in use for much of dynastic China from the Qing dynasty until the late 20th century. With the modernization of traditional Chinese music in the 1970s, the four-stringed liuqin was developed as an improvement to its musical range, and the body of the instrument was enlarged to allow players to handle the instrument with greater ease.

== Playing technique, tones and range ==
Liuqin tuning.

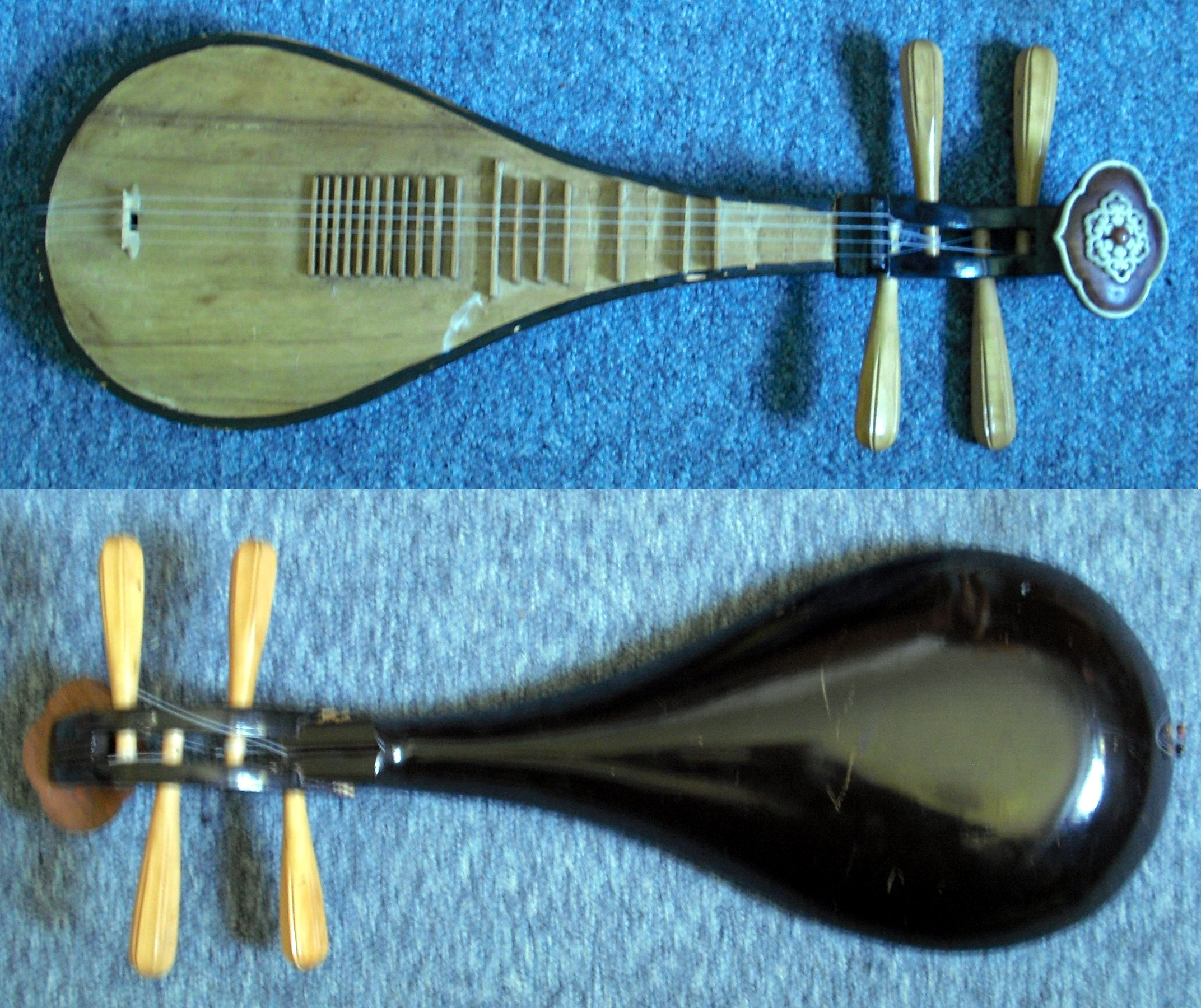
The front and back of a vintage Liuqin

The playing technique is similar to that of the mandolin, using a plectrum and frequently using the tremolo technique. Its strings are either tuned in fifths, G-D-A-E (as a mandolin or violin), or else in a mixture of fourths and fifths, as for example G-D-G-D, which is the more common tuning employed by mainstream players of the liuqin. This makes playing of the liuqin exactly the same as the zhongruan, which is tuned an octave lower, hence players of either the liuqin or the ruan can often double on both instruments.

The liuqin has a refreshing, jubilant and delicate tonal quality.

The modern liuqin has four steel strings. Like the ruan, the number of the liuqin's frets was increased from 7 to 29 over the course of the 20th century. These frets are arranged in half-step intervals. As the frets on all Chinese lutes are high, the fingers do not touch the instruments' bodies—distinctively different from western fretted instruments. This allows for a greater control over timbre and intonation than their western counterparts, but makes chordal playing (double, triple, quadruple stopping) more difficult.

== Notable players of the liuqin ==
- Wang Huiran (王惠然, 1936-2023), (Note: Wang Huiran, a Chinese instrumental music composer, was the leader of instrument revolution of liuqin. He wrote multiple famous liuqin pieces. He is called "Father of the liuqin".) esteemed "Father of the liuqin"
- Wang Hongyi (王红艺), daughter of Wang Huiran
- NiNi Music
- Mei Han, guzheng who doubles on liuqin

== Liuqin repertoire ==
=== Composed/ co-composed/ adapted by Wang Huiran (王惠然) ===
- Canal Works of Happiness
- Melody on a Moonlit River
- Sing a Mountain Song of Love
- Spring Comes to River Yi (春到沂河)
- The Lark (Yun Que) Romanian Folk Music
- Warrior Suite

=== By other composers ===
- Sword Dance (劍器)
- Beyond the Horizons (天地星空)
- Courtyard After The Rain (雨后庭院)

== See also ==
- Traditional Chinese musical instruments
