= Shanghai Chinese Orchestra =

The Shanghai Chinese Orchestra (Chinese: 上海民族乐团) is a large orchestra of traditional Chinese musical instruments based in Shanghai, China. Established in 1952, was the first large-scale modern orchestra of traditional instruments in China. Its conductor is Wang Fujian (王甫建).

The orchestra performs large-scale works as well as pieces for medium-sized and small ensembles of various instrumentations. It also frequently performs new compositions, many of which have won awards at the Shanghai Spring International Music Festival and the Shanghai International Art Festival.

The orchestra has performed in more than 80 cities in China, as well as in more than 30 foreign countries. It often performs for heads of state and other dignitaries when they visit China. In 2001 and 2003 it performed two Chinese New Year concerts at the Musikverein in Vienna.
