= Liu Wenjin =

Chinese composer

- 刘文金
- Born: May 1937; Tangshan, Hebei Province, China
- Died: 27 June 2013 (aged 76); Beijing, People's Republic of China
- Occupation: composer
- Known for: classical Chinese music
- Notable work: Ballad of North Henan Province, Sanmenxia Changxiangqu ("Sanmen Gorge Rhapsody")

Liu Wenjin (simplified Chinese: 刘文金; traditional Chinese: 劉文金, May 1937 – 27 June 2013) was a Chinese composer of classical Chinese music best known for his erhu piece Sanmenxia Changxiangqu ("Sanmen Gorge Rhapsody", 1981). He also composed, among other things, Ballad of Yubei.

Liu as born in Tangshan, Hebei Province and later went to the United States under the auspices of the Chinese Music Society of North America.

He was one of China's most distinguished and respected composer-conductors.

A prolific composer, Liu wrote pieces spanning instrumental, vocal, choral and song-and-dance music. He also scored for more than a dozen television drama series. His instrumental works include 'Impressions of Taixing Mountain', 'Ambush from All Sides' and 'Jasmine' for Chinese orchestra.

During his younger years, Liu excelled in his academic studies and received the most outstanding student award. During this period, he also composed his first two erhu works, 'Ballad of North Henan Province' and 'The Sanmen Gorge Capriccio', which were sister pieces combining both the erhu and piano.

Liu transcribed 'Tiger down the Mountain' from Chinese Rhapsody by Xian Xinghai in October 1975 to commemorate the 30th anniversary of Xian Xinghai's death.

In 1993, the 'Ballad of North Henan Province' was chosen as "20th century's classic Chinese music". In 1999, 'The Sanmen Gorge Capriccio' was chosen into the album of "stage craft of new China and master works of movies and TV art". In May 1982 at the Shanghai Spring concert, the debut of his erhu concerto, 'The Great Wall Capriccio' achieved resounding success and was hailed as a milestone in contemporary erhu composition even till today.

For over 40 years, Liu visited many countries to attend interviews, give lectures and serve as guest conductor in many different orchestras. He was widely recognised for his outstanding contribution to the promotion of Chinese classical music and international cultural exchange.

Liu died in Beijing on 27 June 2013.
