= Zhongruan =

Chinese plucked string instrument

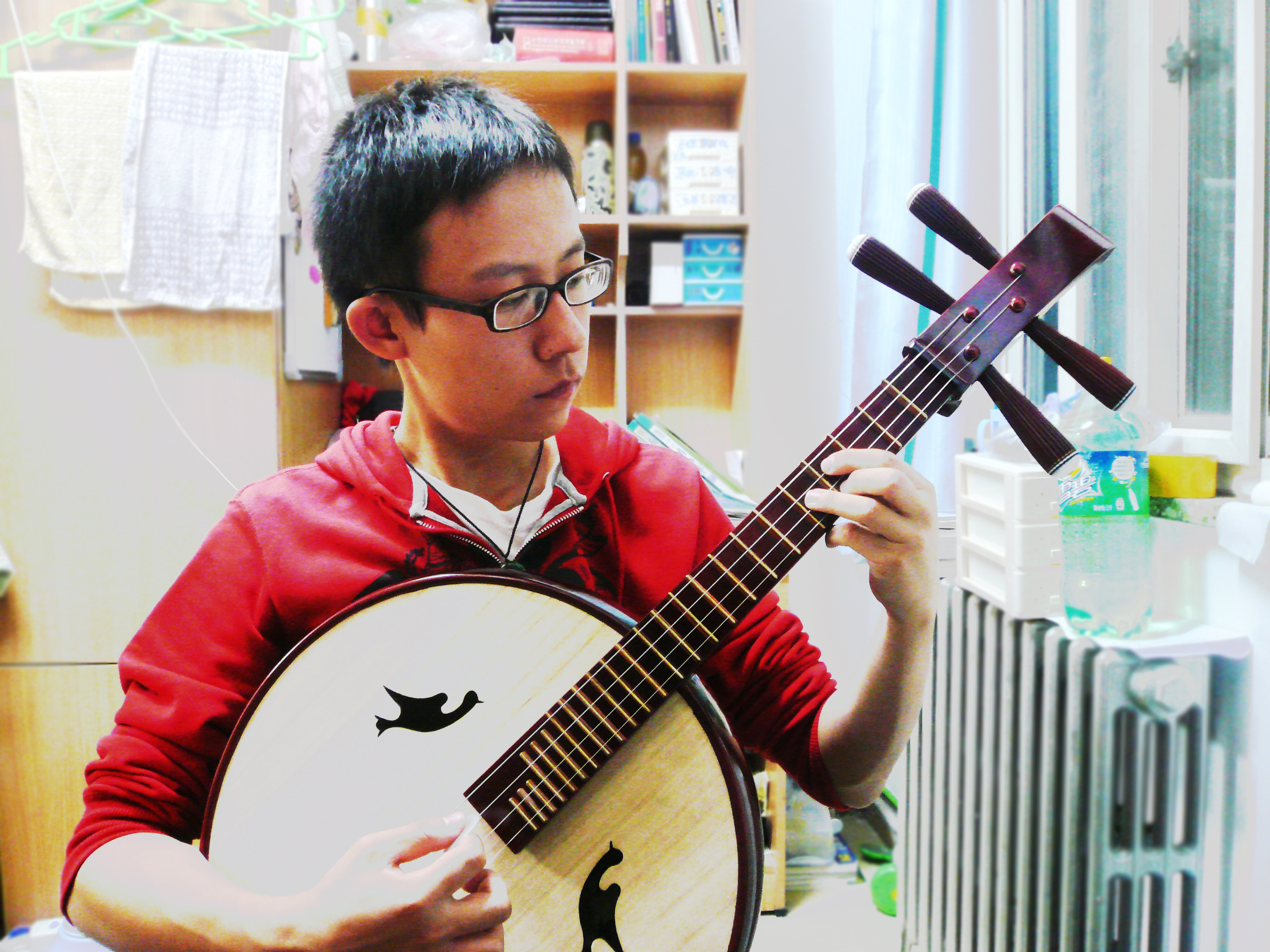

String instrument
- Classification: Plucked string instrument Ruan
- Inventors: Chinese musical instrument

Related instruments
- Pipa

Sound sample

The zhongruan (Chinese: 中阮; pinyin: zhōngruǎn; lit. 'tenor ruan') is a Chinese plucked string instrument. The zhongruan has a straight neck with 24 frets on the fingerboard and 4 strings. It is usually played with a plectrum (guitar pick). It can also be played with fingers (index finger and thumb with acrylic nails), which is similar to the way of playing the pipa (琵琶). The zhongruan is a tenor-ranged instrument in the family of ruan (阮). In ancient China, the ruan was called Qin pipa (Qin [Dynasty] pipa, 秦琵琶) or Ruan xian (阮咸). Now the ruan has expanded to different sizes and the zhongruan is the "medium" one.

== Use ==
The default tuning of zhongruan is G_{2} D_{3} G_{3} D_{4} . It can also be tuned as G_{2} D_{3} A_{3} E_{4} , or A_{2} D_{3} D_{3} D_{4} , or other variants, according to requirements in music scores. Since the zhongruan has a rounded, calm and rich tone, it is usually played as a lead instrument in small ensembles and used to accompany other instruments in Chinese orchestra. It can also be played solo.

== Construction ==
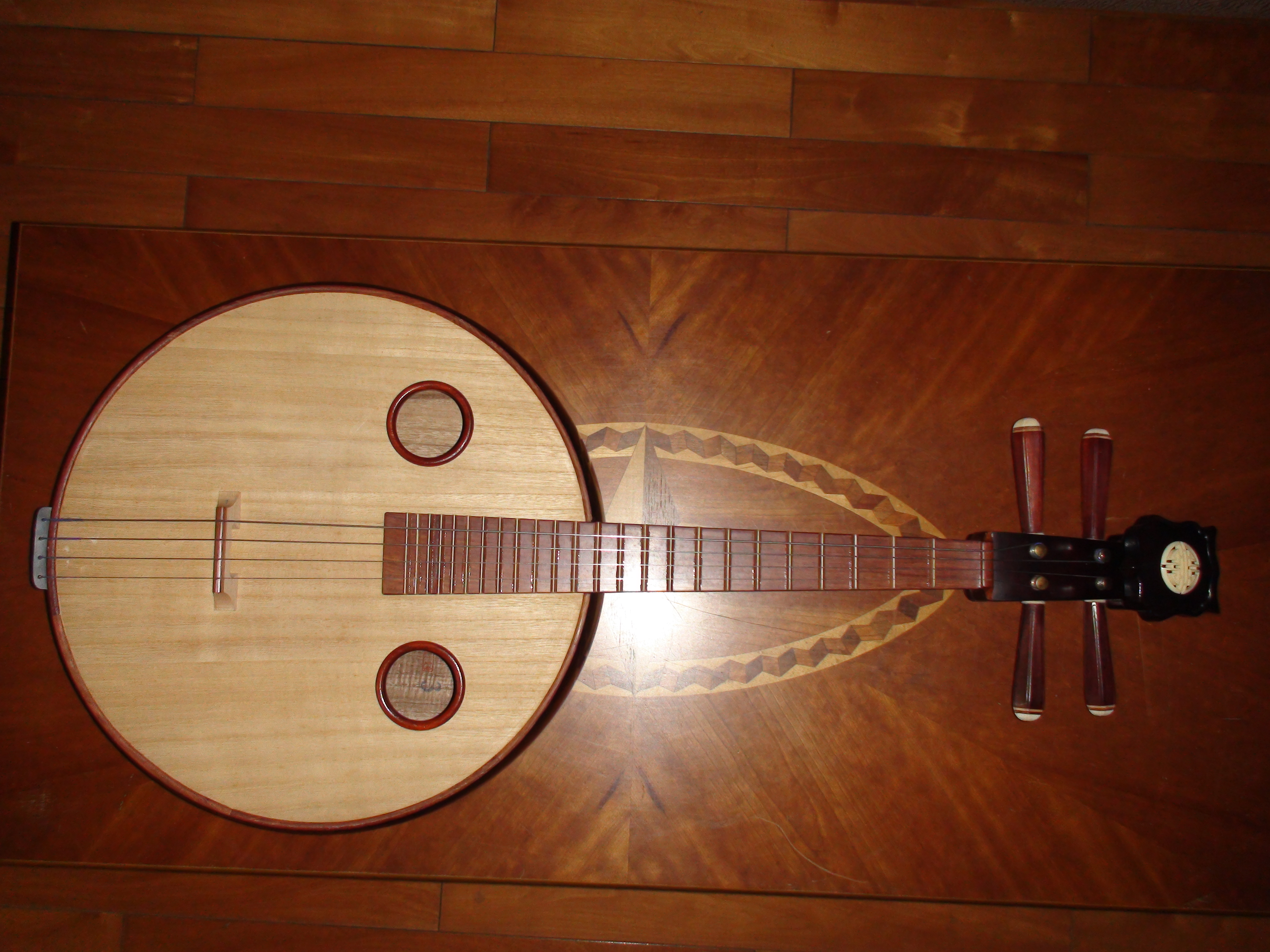
Zhongruan

Most zhongruan are made of rosewood (紅木). It is typically agreed that for a better sound quality and visual appearance, it should be made of red sandalwood (紫檀木), because red sandalwood is well known for its distinctive wood grain, unique purplish color, hardness and rareness. Therefore, a red sandalwood made zhongruan is heavier and more expensive.

The lute head (琴頭) is for decoration. Three common decorative patterns are ruyi (如意, good fortune), peony and dragon. They are usually made of plastic or ivory.

Under the lute head is a pegbox (弦軸箱) with tuning pegs (琴栓) that hold the strings. The pegs are usually made of wood or buffalo horn. Nowadays, most zhongruans have tuning machine heads (弦鈕) instead of a peg box, since they make it easier to tune. There are some makers that still use the traditional peg box system but coupled with fine tuners at the tailpiece.

The strings (弦) were made of silk in the old times. The number of strands of silk determined the thickness of the string. Nowadays, metal wound polymer strings are used.

A nut (山口) is placed between the pegbox and the neck to secure the strings. It is usually made of plastic, buffalo bone or ivory.

The neck (琴頸) connects the lute head and the body. It has a fingerboard (指板) and 24 frets (品). The frets are usually made of plastic, buffalo bone, wood and metal (copper). For a good quality zhongruan, the frets are made of a combination of plastic and copper, or wood and copper, with the metal part inlaid at the top of each fret. In combining two materials, the frets last without damaging from long-time practice.

The circular sound box (共鳴箱) body is made of a combination of front board, back board and side board. There are two sound holes (音孔) on the front board to transmit sound. Some common shapes for the sound holds are circle, moon, S, and bird.

At the lower part of the body, a bridge (琴碼) is placed to support the strings and transmit vibration.

At the bottom of the body is a tailpiece (縛弦) to anchor the strings.

Note that the frets on all Chinese lutes are high so that the fingers never touch the actual body—distinctively different from western fretted instruments. This allows for a greater control over timbre and intonation than their western counterparts, but makes chordal playing more difficult.

== Some Zhongruan music pieces ==
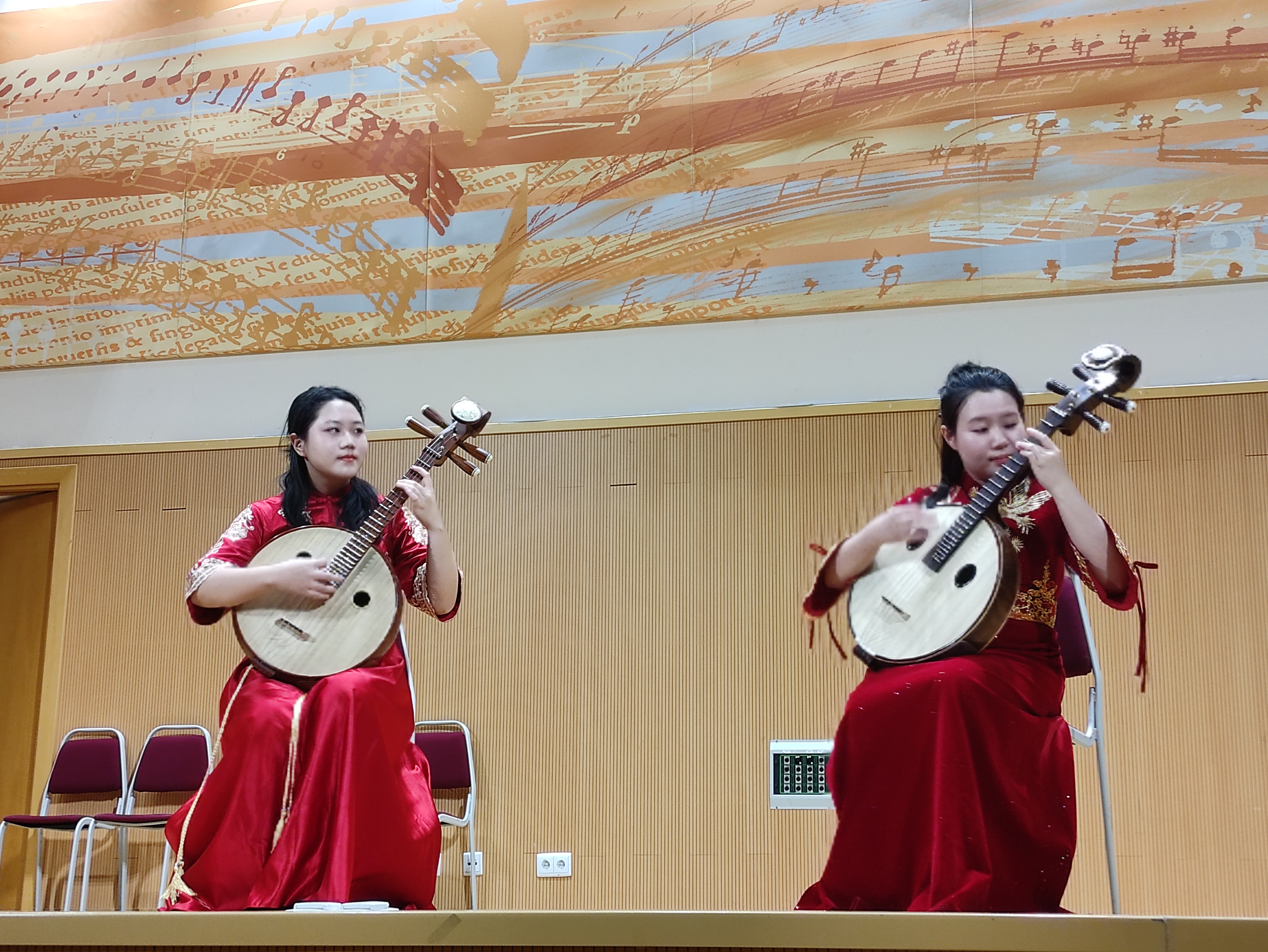
- Two Zhongruan players of the NENU Folkloric Orchestra playing in a concert in Torrent, Land of Valencia.
  《滿江紅》 The River All Red (zhongruan concerto)
- 《雲南回憶》 Reminiscences of Yunnan (zhongruan concerto)
- 《睡蓮》 Water Lily (zhongruan solo)
- 《絲路駝鈴》 Camel Bells of the Silk Road (zhongruan solo)
- 《孤芳自賞》 Narcissistic (zhongruan solo)
- 《火把節之夜》 The Night of the Torch Festival (zhongruan solo)
- 《倒垂簾》 The Turned Over Curtain (zhongruan solo)
- 《中阮摇滚》, also named 《男人的刀》 Zhong Ruan Rock N' Roll (zhongruan solo)
- 《山歌》 Folk Song (zhongruan solo)
- 《天地之間》 Between the Sky and the Land (zhongruan duet)

== Composers and performers ==
Performers:

- 张思安 Djang San (inventor of the electric zhongruan)
- Jan Linton (western and Chinese style CD releases)
- 刘波 Liu Bo
- 沈非 Shen Fei
- 潘宜彤 Dabby Pan
- 吳強 Wu Qiang
- 张蓉晖 Zhang Ronghui (新加坡华乐团 Singapore Chinese Orchestra)
- 阮仕春 Ruan Shichun
- 陈素敏 Tan Su-Min, Clara
- 饶思名 Rao Si-Ming, Jonathan
- 魏蔚 Wei Wei
- 苗晓芸 Miao Xiaoyun, tenor and bass ruan, pipa
- 刘星 Liu Xing
- 张鑫华 Zhang Xinhua
- 徐陽 Xu Yang
- 罗彩霞 Lo Chai Xia
- 魏育茹 Wei Yuru

Composers:

- 张思安 Djang San (inventor of the electric zhongruan)
- 苏涵达 Tommy Su Handa
- 林吉良 Lin Jiliang
- 吳俊生 Wu Junsheng
- 劉星 Liu Xing
- 寧勇 Ning Yong
- 王仲丙 Wang Zhongbing

== See also ==
- Ruan
- List of Chinese musical instruments
- Chinese Orchestra
