= China National Traditional Orchestra =

- Orchestra
- Official Logo
- Native name: 中国中央民族乐团
- Short name: China National Orchestra
- Former name: China Central Nationalities Orchestra, among many others
- Location: Beijing, China
- Concert hall: National Centre for the Performing Arts – Concert Hall, Beijing
- Principal conductor: Liu Sha
- Music director: Jiang Ying

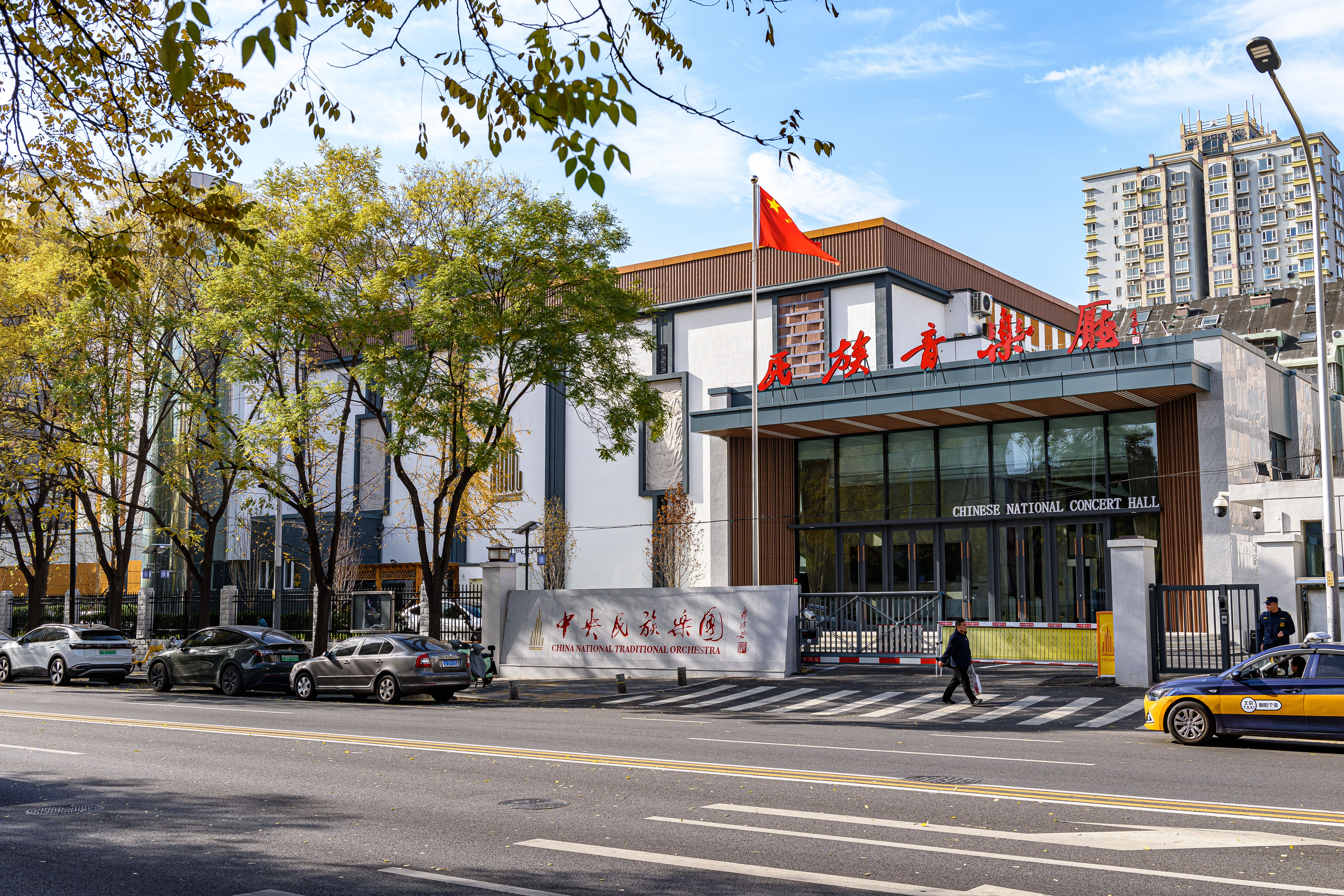
Headquarters

The China National Traditional Orchestra (CNTO) (Chinese: 中国 中央 民族 乐团 or 中央 民族 乐团; also called China National Orchestra) is a 110-piece orchestra of traditional Chinese musical instruments with an accompanying folk choir. Founded in Beijing, China in 1960, the orchestra is a state-level (national) performing arts institution directly administered and endorsed by China's Ministry of Culture (MOC). Its mission is to promote and advance China's musical heritage. CNTO is part of a cultural exchange program called Image China and the orchestra is managed by the China Arts and Entertainment Group (CAEG).

== History ==
The China National Traditional Orchestra was founded by composer and conductor Li Huanzhi (1919–2000), the former chair of the Chinese Musicians' Association. CNTO's current president and producer is musician and ethnomusicologist Xi Qiang, who is a member of the National Committee of the Chinese People's Political Consultative Conference. In 1993, the China National Traditional Orchestra founded Orchestra Asia, together with Ensemble Nipponia of Japan and the South Korean National Orchestra.

In the interest of promoting a larger view of Chinese culture, CNTO became the first Chinese orchestra known for combining music performance with other Chinese art forms, such as painting. Its 2015 concert tour Rediscover Chinese Music, was promoted as "a breathtaking multimedia experience" with storytelling, lighting and sound special effects, multimedia backdrops, and moving scenery.

=== Alternate names ===
The China National Traditional Orchestra has been known by several English names over the years, largely due to challenges with Chinese translation. The orchestra's Chinese name is pronounced in Chinese as Zhōngguó Zhōngyāng Mínzú Yuètuán, (Note: The orchestra name is shown in Pinyin, a system for writing Chinese characters with the Latin alphabet to assist with Chinese pronunciation.) where Zhōngguó means "China," zhōngyāng means "central," and mínzú yuètuán means "ethnic nationalities" orchestra.

In English-speaking countries, the CNTO has been misidentified as other similarly named Chinese orchestras. The orchestra has also been referred to by different names within the same news article and in the orchestra's own promotional materials.

English variants of the orchestra's name include:

Central Chinese Orchestra	Central Traditional Orchestra	Central Nationalities Orchestra
China Central Chinese Orchestra	China Central Folk Orchestra	China Central Orchestra
China Central National Music Orchestra	China Central National Orchestra	China Chinese Central National Orchestra
China Chinese National Orchestra	Chinese National Orchestra	China Central Nationalities Orchestra
National Chinese Traditional Orchestra	National Orchestra of China	National Traditional Orchestra of China

Perhaps owing to its favored relationship with China's Ministry of Culture, orchestra leadership might have continually revised the ensemble's English name to reflect its current importance or social status, differentiate it from countless other Chinese orchestras, and emphasize the CNTO's stated mission of "sharing China's musical heritage with the world." In 2015, the orchestra has been consistently billed and promoted as the China National Traditional Orchestra at the Kennedy Center, Carnegie Hall, and Lincoln Center, as evidenced by venue calendars and ticket sales webpages.

== Notable orchestra members ==
- Xi Qiang, producer and president of the orchestra

=== Musicians ===
- Wang Chaoge, director
- Jiang Ying, composer and arranger
- Liu Sha, conductor
- Tang Feng, Erhu
- Jin Yue, Erhu
- Wang Ciheng, Dizi and Xiao
- Wu Yuxia, Pipa and deputy president of the orchestra
- Zhao Cong, Pipa
- Yu Yuanchun, Pipa
- Wei Yuru, Ruan
- Feng Maintain, Ruan
- Niu Jiandang, Suona
- Zhu Jianping, percussion
- Yu Xin, percussion
- Chen Shasha and Ding Xiaokui, Dizi
- Zhang Jiali, Guan
- Lu Ning, Guqin

=== Creative team ===
- Li Bin, stage design
- Wang Yugang, lighting design
- Gan Hua, multimedia design
- Zheng Zejian, multimedia design
- Zuo Huanyu, costume design
- Shen Tian, sound design

== Performances ==
The orchestra has performed throughout China and visited dozens of nations on five continents.

=== Highlights ===
- In 1984, American classical composer Shen Sinyan, a member of the Chinese Music Society of North America, invited the orchestra to tour the United States. The orchestra became "the first Chinese orchestra of Chinese instruments" to do so.
- In 1996, the Carnegie Hall Corporation commissioned Chinese-American composer Bright Sheng to create Spring Dreams, a concerto for Yo-Yo Ma and the orchestra.
- In 1997, Spring Dreams was performed by the orchestra and the famed cellist.
- In 1998, the orchestra performed for the first time at a special New Year concert in the Vienna Golden Hall (a.k.a. Wiener Musikverein).
- In 2004, the orchestra cancelled its appearance at a concert that contained Christian content.
- In 2011, the orchestra became the first traditional Chinese music group to perform at Austria's Salzburg Summer Festival.
- In 2014, American pop music artist Katy Perry visited the orchestra to hear an arrangement of her song "Roar" played on traditional Chinese instruments.
- In December 2015, members from the orchestra performed for and with students of Washington Yu Ying Public Charter School in a school assembly; the first time the orchestra had performed for local primary school students. The school's chorus – 40 singers, ages 9 to 11 – also performed a song with the orchestra during its Kennedy Center concert dates.

Performance chronology (Note: The Performance chronology table is not a complete history of performances. This is only the information we have discovered to date.)
Year	Dates	Location	Venue	Event and/or Concert	Notes	Source
1984	11 August	Washington, DC	National Museum of Natural History		Concert presented by the Smithsonian Resident Associate Program.	The Washington Post; Smithsonian Institution Archives
1989	September	Beijing, China	Beijing Concert Hall		In collaboration with the Han-Tang Yuefu Ensemble.	Taiwan Today
1997	19 February	Worcester, MA	Mechanics Hall	premier of Spring Dreams	Performance of concerto commissioned for Yo-Yo Ma and the orchestra.	Worcester Magazine; ISSUU ScoresOnDemand
1997	20 February	New York, NY	Carnegie Hall	premier of Spring Dreams	Performance of concerto commissioned for Yo-Yo Ma and the orchestra.	New York Times; ISSUU ScoresOnDemand
1998	27 January	Vienna, Austria	Vienna Golden Hall (Wiener Musikverein)	Chinese Lunar New Year Concert / Grand Chinese New Year Concert	Chen Xieyang, conductor	South China Morning Post; Beijing Review
2000	24 August	New York, NY	United Nations (UN) General Assembly Hall	China Cultural Exchange 2000		BeijingTheatre.com; The China Report
2000	26–27 August	Washington, DC	Eisenhower Theater, Kennedy Center for the Performing Arts			Washington City Paper
2000	31 August	Chicago, IL	Orchestra Hall, Symphony Center	China National Orchestra Gala Concert		Chicago Reader; Chinese Music Society of North America
2000	3 September	St. Louis, MO	Powell Symphony Hall	Faces of Love Towards the East	St. Louis Mayor Clarence Harmon proclaimed 3 September 2000 as China National Orchestra Day.	St. Louis Chinese American News
2000	10 September	San Francisco, CA	Davies Symphony Hall		San Francisco debut. Sold-out performance. Standing ovation. At the end of program, the orchestra played three encores.	AsianWeek; San Francisco Classical Voice
2000	17 September	New York, NY	Lincoln Center	The Bronze Culture Festival	Yo-Yo Ma performs.	The Wall Street Journal
2010	29 January	Brussels, Belgium	BOZAR Centre for Fine Arts	Europalia China Art Festival	Concert organized by Europalia International and the Chinese Ministry of Culture.	BOZAR Centre for Fine Arts Calendar; China.org.cn
2010	30 January	Paris, France	UNESCO Headquarters or Maison de l'UNESCO	Chinese New Year Concert	By invitation, limited seating capacity. Chen Xieyang, conductor	UNESCO
2010	1 November	Beijing, China	Concert Hall of the NCPA (National Center for the Performing Arts)	Month-long series of stage performances to celebrate the country's cultural achievements	Chen Xieyang, conductor	China Central Television
2011	5 August	Salzburg, Austria		91st Salzburg Festival / Salzburg Summer Festival	Marks the first time a traditional Chinese music group played at this event.: Chen Xieyang, director; Xi Qiang, orchestra chair	China Central Television; Xinhua News Agency
2011	7 December	Beijing, China	Concert Hall of the NCPA (National Center for the Performing Arts)	Part of concert series: One Hundred Concerts of Chinese Music		BeijingTheatre.com
2012	14 June	Beijing, China	Concert Hall of the NCPA (National Center for the Performing Arts)	Bamboo in Blues		BeijingTheatre.com
2013	4 February	Los Angeles, CA		Spring Festival Celebration		
2013	8–10 February	Stanford, CA	Bing Concert Hall, Stanford University	Pan-Asian Music Festival; Friday Night's Concert: Masters and Masterpieces	Three-day residency at the university culminated in live performance, with several standing ovations and four encores...	Stanford Report; Stanford Pan-Asian Music Festival 2013 (program); Official Press Release
2013	17 February	Raleigh, NC	Meymandi Concert Hall, Duke Energy Center for the Performing Arts	China on String	Stars of the National Chinese Traditional Orchestra in a program with the Raleigh Symphony Orchestra. Program sponsored by Confucius Institute at NC State University and the Carolina China Council.	CVNC: An Online Arts Journal
2013	26 August	Beijing, China	Concert Hall of the NCPA (National Center for the Performing Arts)	Impression of Chinese Music	Wang Chaoge, director	CITS
2013	2 October	Sanford, NC	Dennis A. Wicker Civic Center, Central Carolina Community College	Chinese Music Exhibition & Seminar	Xi Qiang, artistic director	US Fed News Service; Central Carolina Community College News
2013	22 November	St. Petersburg, Russia	Mariinsky Theater, Theatre Square	Chinese Tourism Year in Russia		China Central Television
2014	13 January	Beijing, China		Roar	Katy Perry visited.	Getmusic Asia; China Central Television
2014	14 February	San Francisco, CA		Chinese New Year Concert		Consulate General of the People's Republic of China in San Francisco
2015	15 February	Chicago, IL	Symphony Center	Sounds of China: A Chinese New Year Celebration	Presented in collaboration with the Chinese Fine Arts Society (CFAS): Jiuyue Ma, artistic director	Chicago Tribune; Chicago Symphony Orchestra Association; Chicago Chinatown Chamber of Commerce E-News
2015	15 April	Vancouver, British Columbia, Canada	Chan Centre for the Performing Arts, University of British Columbia	China-Canada Year Opening Ceremony		China Daily US
2015	7 May	Atlanta, GA	The World of Coca-Cola	Free concert to launch the Qin-Tai – Chinese Music Program	Brought to Atlanta by the Chinese People's Association for Friendship with Foreign Countries and the State Council Information Office of the People's Republic of China.	GCIV Exchange Newsletter
2015	27 November	Shanghai, China	Shanghai Grand Theater	Rediscover Chinese Music	An experimental program.: Xi Qiang, orchestra president; Wang Chaoge, director; Jiang Ying, composer	Shanghai Daily
2015	11–13 December	Washington, DC	Kennedy Center Opera House	Rediscover Chinese Music	The Washington Yu Ying Public Charter School Chorus performed with the orchestra.: Jiang Ying, composer and arranger; Li Bin, stage design; Wang Yugang, lighting design; Gan Hua and Zheng Zejian, multimedia design; Zuo Huanyu, costume design; Shen Tian, sound design; Xi Qiang, producer	Kennedy Center; Washington Post Magazine; DC Outlook; Washington Chinese Media; Metro Weekly; NewsChannel 8 (cable)
2015	18 December	New York, NY	Lincoln Center	China National Traditional Orchestra: Splendor of Folk Music	Tang Feng, Erhu (Chinese Fiddle); Wu Yuxia, Pipa (Chinese Lute); Wang Ciheng, Dongxiao (Chinese Bamboo Flute); Wu Lin, Konghou (Chinese Harp); Zhao Cong, Pipa (Chinese Lute)	Lincoln Center; Broadway World; New York Classical Review
2015	20 December	New York, NY	Carnegie Hall	Impression Guoyue: Traditional Master Works	Orchestra was invited by the Princeton International Chinese Music Festival.: Jiang Ying, composer and arranger; Liu Sha, conductor; Tang Feng and Jin Yue, erhu; Wang Ciheng, dizi and xiao; Wu Yuxia, Zhao Cong, and Yu Yuanchun, pipa; Feng Maintain, ruan; Niu Jiandang, suona; Zhu Jianping and Yu Xin, percussion; Chen Shasha and Ding Xiaokui, dizi; Zhang Jiali, guanzi; Lu Ning, gu qin	Lucid Culture (NY blog); Carnegie Hall; Broadway World; Xinhua News Agency
2019	25 January	Washington, DC	Opera House at the John F. Kennedy Center for the Performing Arts	Image China: Xuanzang's Pilgrimagen		Broadway World

== Criticism ==
The China National Traditional Orchestra has faced its share of criticism in the past – both at home and abroad – in that it did not actually promote actual traditional Chinese music in the beginning, but rather, it used the Western-style orchestra model that was prevalent in much of the orchestra world. Historically, traditional Chinese music was performed with soloists or in small ensembles rather than in large concert halls. What's more, to be more accessible to Western audiences when playing internationally, the orchestra's concert repertoire has in the past included works by Bach and Strauss, and contemporary songs like "New York, New York", and non-Chinese patriotic hymns like "America the Beautiful". In recent years, the orchestra has focused on the commission and arrangement of more traditional pieces representative of its heritage.

Not to be outdone by Western or popular music trends, the orchestra also collaborates with well-known directors like Wang Chaoge to help inject energy into traditional music performances by "creating innovative shows." The orchestra's performances outside of China appear to be well received, as inferred by sold-out concerts, standing ovations, multiple encores, and media coverage. For example, at the December 2015 Kennedy Center premiere of Rediscover Chinese Music, an audience member was recorded on camera saying "[the show] was moving. It was beautiful." One could assume that the orchestra's efforts to fuse modern stage production values with ethnic melodies has been a successful tactic in attracting new, enthusiastic audiences.
