= Ministry of Culture and Tourism (China) =

Government ministry of China

Ministry of Culture and Tourism of the People's Republic of China
- 中华人民共和国文化和旅游部
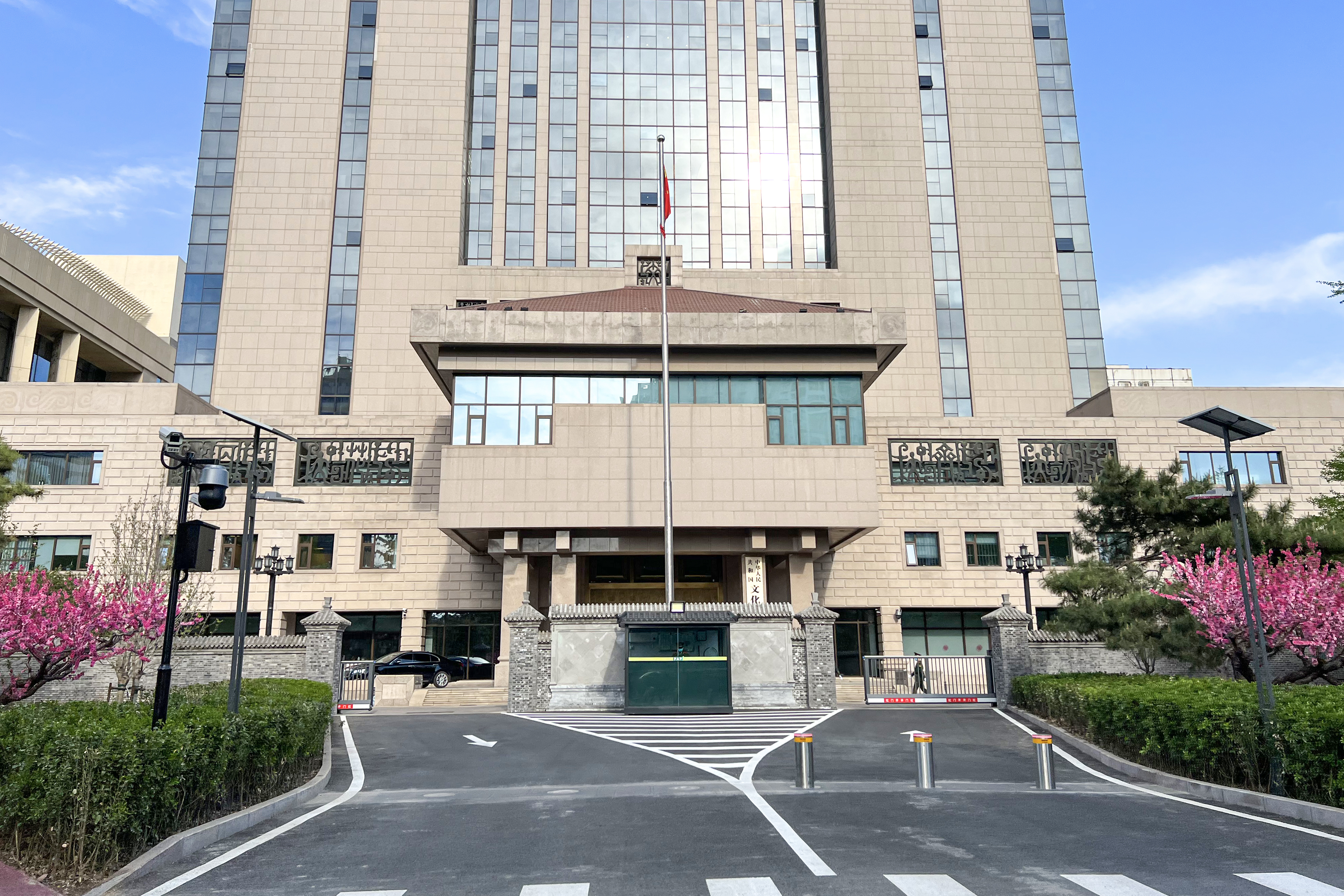

Agency overview
- Formed: 19 March 2018; 8 years ago
- Jurisdiction: Government of China
- Headquarters: Beijing
- Minister responsible: Sun Yeli, Minister
- Parent agency: State Council
- Website: www.mct.gov.cn

Chinese name
- Simplified Chinese: 中华人民共和国文化和旅游部
- Traditional Chinese: 中華人民共和國文化和旅遊部
Transcriptions
Standard Mandarin
- Hanyu Pinyin: Zhōnghuá Rénmín Gònghéguó Wénhuà hé lǚyóubù

The Ministry of Culture and Tourism of the People's Republic of China is a constituent department of the State Council of China in charge of culture and tourism.

The ministry was established on 19 March 2018 based on the Ministry of Culture and the China National Tourism Administration.

== History ==
On March 17, 2018, the functions of the Ministry of Culture and the China National Tourism Administration were consolidated into a single ministry as part of the deepening the reform of the Party and state institutions. Luo Shugang was elected as the first Minister of Culture and Tourism.

== Executive actions ==
In September 2020, China News Service reported that the Ministry of Culture and Tourism stated that it will focus on strengthening the content censorship and on-site supervision of talk shows, Xiangsheng, Pioneer drama, experimental drama and other language shows.

== Institutional organization ==
The Ministry of Culture and Tourism has the following institutions:

=== Internal departments ===
- General Department
- Department of Policies and Regulations
- Department of Personnel
- Department of Finance
- Department of the Arts
- Department of Public Services
- Department of Science, Technology and Education (National Arts and Science Planning Leading Group Office)
- Department of Intangible Cultural Heritage
- Department of Industrial Development
- Department of Resource Development
- Department of Market Management
- Cultural Market Comprehensive Law Enforcement Supervision Bureau
- Bureau of International Exchange and Cooperation (Hong Kong, Macao and Taiwan Office)
- Party Committee of the Ministry of Culture and Tourism
- Retired Cadres Bureau

=== Affiliate national bureau ===
- National Administration of Cultural Heritage (Deputy Ministerial Level)

=== Affiliate public institutions ===
1. Agency Service Bureau of the Ministry of Culture and Tourism (Agency Service Center)
2. Ministry of Culture and Tourism Information Center
3. Chinese National Academy of Arts
4. National Library
5. Palace Museum
6. National Museum of China
7. Central Academy of Culture and Tourism Management
8. China Culture Media Group Co., Ltd.
9. National Peking Opera Theater
10. National Theater of China
11. China Opera and Dance Theater
12. China Oriental Performing Arts Group Co., Ltd.
13. China Symphony Orchestra
14. China Children's Art Theater
15. Central Opera House
16. National Ballet of China
17. China National Traditional Orchestra
18. China Coal Mine Art Troupe
19. National Art Museum of China
20. Fine Art Museum of Research Institute of Traditional Chinese Painting
21. China Digital Culture Group Co., Ltd.
22. China Animation Group Co., Ltd.
23. Ministry of Culture and Tourism Prince Kung's Mansion Museum
24. Talent Center of the Ministry of Culture and Tourism
25. Ministry of Culture and Tourism Retirees Service Center
26. Ministry of Culture and Tourism Art Development Center
27. Qing History Compilation and Research Center, Ministry of Culture and Tourism
28. Chinese and Foreign Cultural Exchange Center
29. National Folk Literature and Art Development Center of the Ministry of Culture and Tourism
30. China Institute of Art and Science and Technology
31. National Center for Public Cultural Development, Ministry of Culture and Tourism
32. National Arts Endowment Management Center
33. Ministry of Culture and Tourism Overseas Cultural Facilities Construction and Management Center
34. "China Tourism News" Co., Ltd.
35. China Tourism Press Co., Ltd.
36. China Tourism Academy (Data Center of the Ministry of Culture and Tourism)
37. Tourism Quality Supervision and Management Institute of the Ministry of Culture and Tourism
38. Mei Lanfang Memorial Hall

== See also ==
- China Arts and Entertainment Group
- Constituent departments of the State Council
