= National Museum of China =

National museum of China in Beijing

Coordinates: 39°54′13″N 116°23′42″E

- 中国国家博物馆

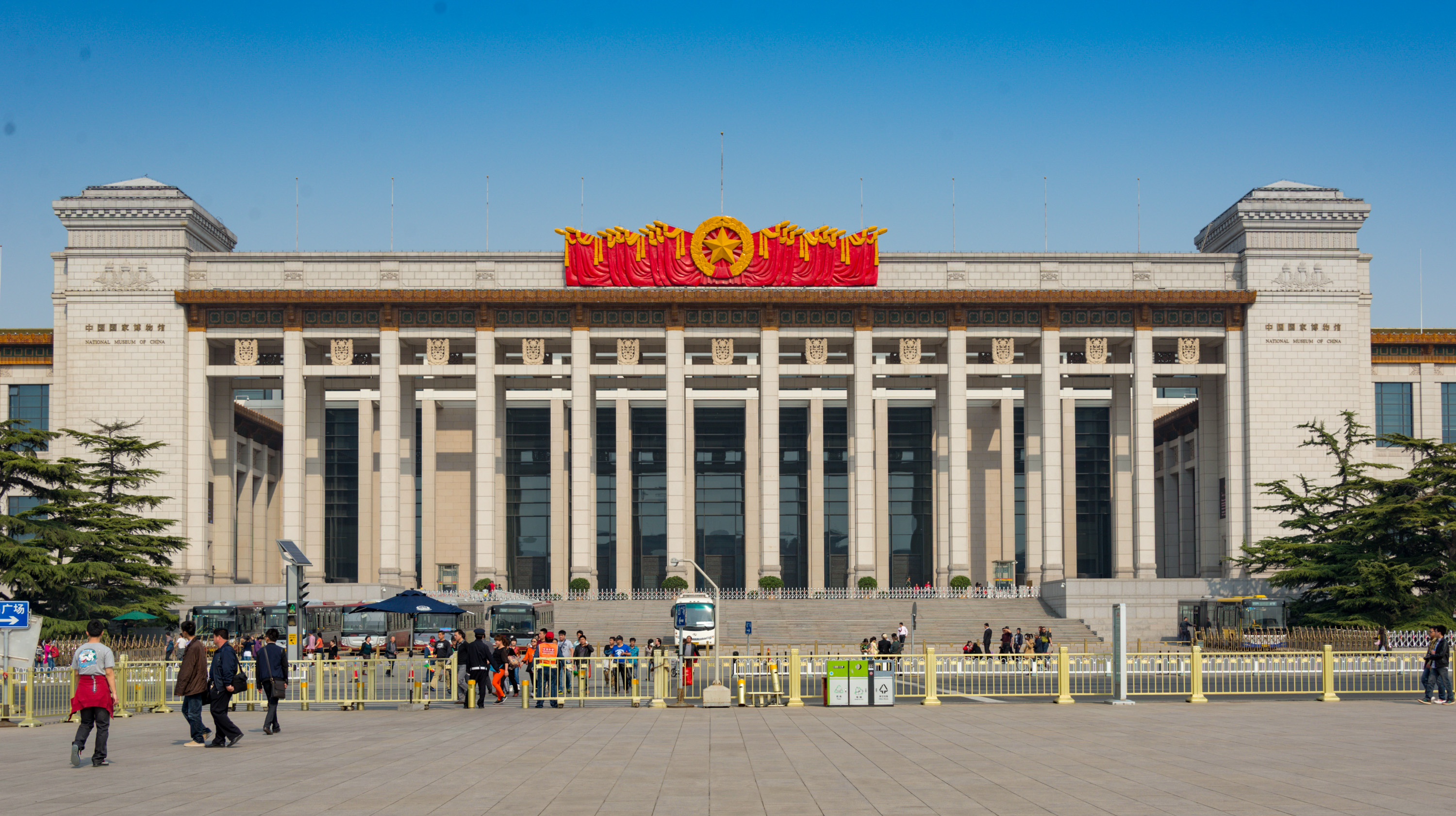
- Established: 2003; 23 years ago
- Location: Beijing
- Type: Art museum, history museum
- Collections: Chinese art
- Collection size: 1.3 million
- Visitors: 2,377,600 (2021)
- Director: Wang Chunfa
- Owner: Ministry of Culture and Tourism
- Public transit access: 1 Tian'anmen East
- Website: en.chnmuseum.cn

The National Museum of China is an art and history museum located on the eastern side of Tiananmen Square in Beijing. The National Museum of China has a total construction area of about 200,000 square meters, a collection of more than 1.4 million items, and 48 exhibition halls. It is the museum with the largest single building area in the world and the museum with the richest collection of Chinese cultural relics. It is a level-1 public welfare institution funded by the Ministry of Culture and Tourism.

== History ==
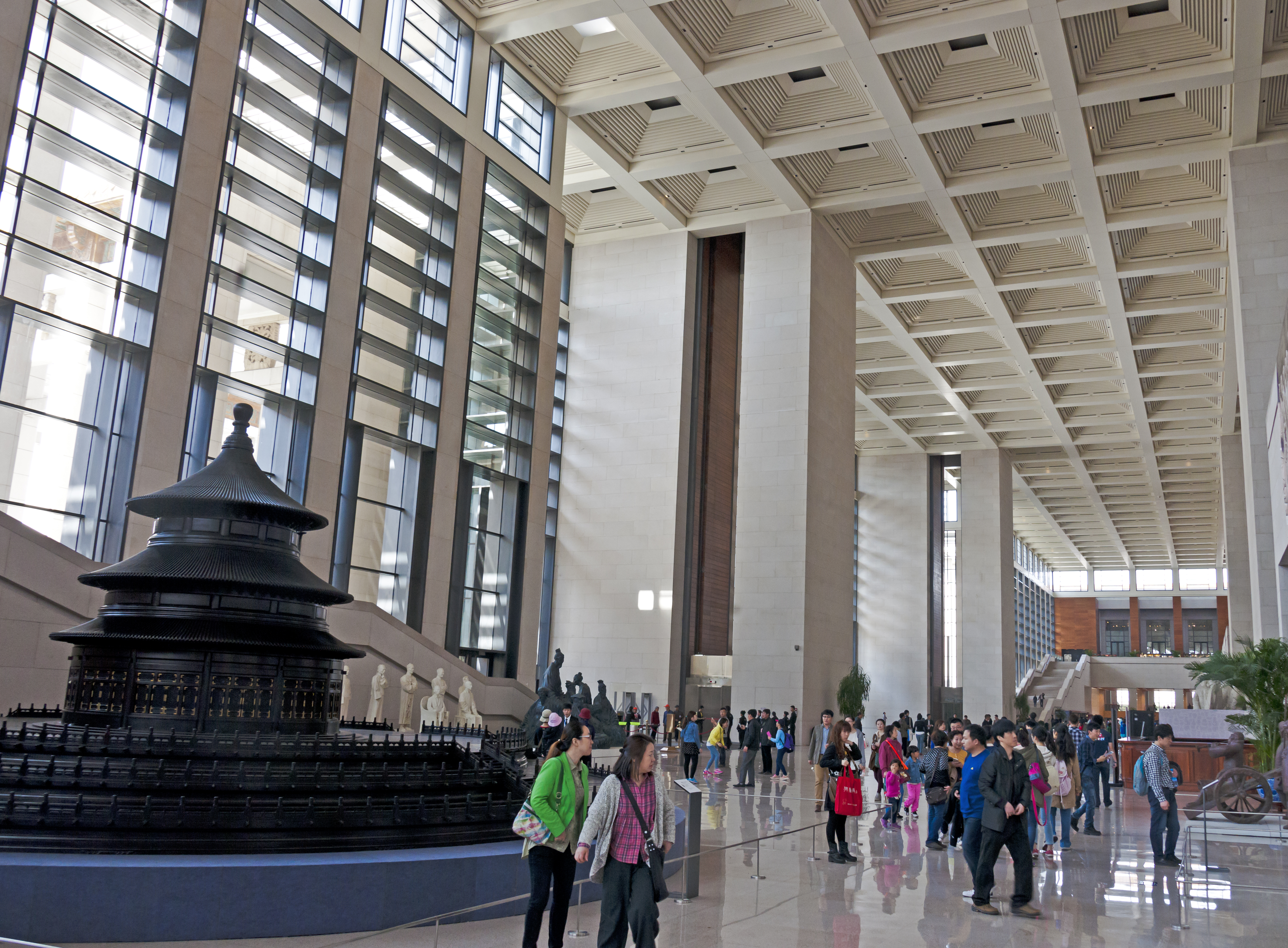
Front foyer with model of the Temple of Heaven, in 2014

The current form of the legal entity of the museum was established in 2003 by the merger of the two museums that had occupied the same building since 1959: the Museum of the Chinese Revolution in the northern wing (originating in the Office of the National Museum of the Revolution founded in 1950 to preserve the legacy of the 1949 revolution) and the National Museum of Chinese History in the southern wing (with origins in both the Beijing National History Museum, founded in 1949, and the Preliminary Office of the National History Museum, founded in 1912, tasked to safeguard China's larger historical legacy).

The building was completed in 1959 as one of the Ten Great Buildings celebrating the ten-year anniversary of the founding of the People's Republic of China. It complements the opposing Great Hall of the People that was built at the same time. The structure sits on 6.5 hectares (16 acres) and has a frontal length of 313 metres (1,027 ft), a height of four stories totaling 40 metres (130 ft), and a width of 149 metres (489 ft). The front displays ten square pillars at its center.

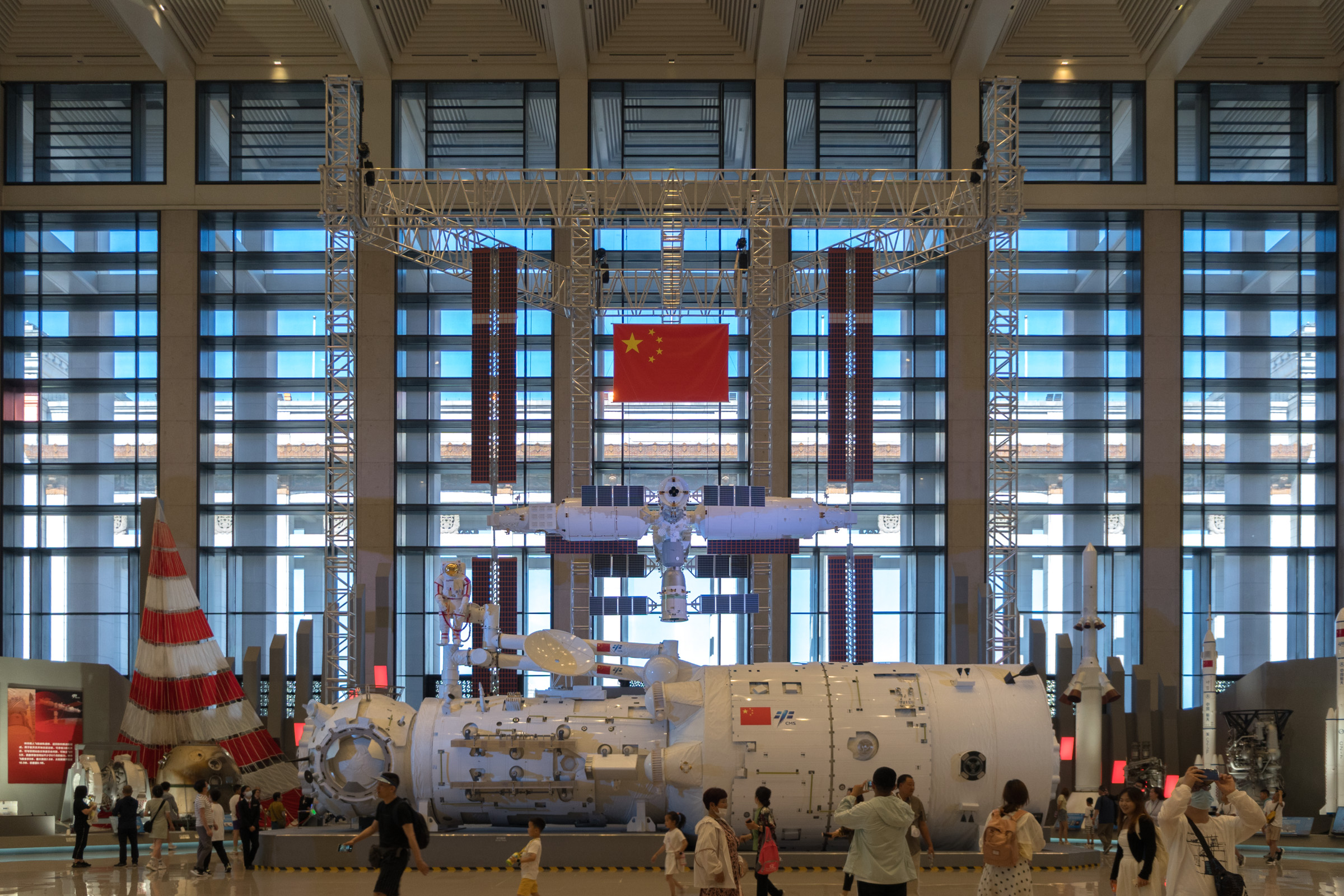
West Hall with exhibition of China Manned Space Program in 2023

After four years of renovation, the museum reopened on March 17, 2011, with 28 new exhibition halls, more than triple the previous exhibition space, and state of the art exhibition and storage facilities. It has a total floor space of nearly 200,000 m^{2} (2.2 million square feet) to display. The renovations were designed by the German firm Gerkan, Marg and Partners.

The museum's "Road to Rejuvenation" exhibit was the site for Xi Jinping's November 2012 articulation of the Chinese Dream political concept. The first half of the exhibit documented China's century of humiliation. The second half depicted China's virtues in overcoming that adversity, the Chinese Communist Revolution, and establishing the People's Republic of China. After touring the exhibit, Xi addressed the media, announcing, "Realizing the great rejuvenation of the Chinese nation is the greatest dream of the Chinese nation in modern times."

Due to the COVID-19 pandemic, the museum was closed for a large part of 2020, and attendance plunged by 78 percent to 1,600,000. Nonetheless, in 2021 it was in second place in the list of most-visited art museums, after the Louvre Museum.

== Collections ==
The museum, covering Chinese history from the Yuanmou Man of 1.7 million years ago to the end of the Qing dynasty (the last imperial dynasty in Chinese history), has a permanent collection of 1,050,000 items, with many precious and rare artifacts not to be found in museums anywhere else in China or the rest of the world.

Among the most important items in the National Museum of China are the "Houmuwu Ding" from the Shang dynasty (the heaviest piece of ancient bronzeware in the world, at 832.84 kg), the square shaped Shang dynasty bronze zun decorated with four sheep heads, a large and rare inscribed Western Zhou dynasty bronze water pan, a gold-inlaid Qin dynasty bronze tally in the shape of a tiger, Han dynasty jade burial suits sewn with gold thread, and a comprehensive collection of Tang dynasty tri-colored glazed sancai and Song dynasty ceramics. The museum also has an important numismatic collection, including 15,000 coins donated by Luo Bozhao.

The museum has a permanent exhibition called The Road to Rejuvenation, which presents the recent history of China since the beginning of the First Opium War, with an emphasis on the history of the Chinese Communist Party (CCP) and its political achievements.

The museum displays the haycutter used by Kuomintang forces to execute the revolutionary martyr Liu Hulan. In 1951, Wang Zhaowen created a sculpture of Liu for the museum. It is regarded as a masterpiece of socialist art and became the official image of Liu.

The exhibit hall addressing the life of Deng Xiaoping includes the Stetson hat he was given at a rodeo during his 1979 visit to the United States. Pictures of Deng donning the hat became a famous image of the visit.

On April 9, 2021, the exhibition "Field of Hope: A National Photographic Exhibition on 'Poverty Alleviation and Sharing a Moderately Prosperous Society'" opened at the museum. The exhibition, hosted by the China Federation of Literary and Art Circles, the National Museum of China and the China Photographers Association, features 180 photographs by nearly 150 different photographers, showcasing the country's effort in alleviating poverty.

=== Gallery ===
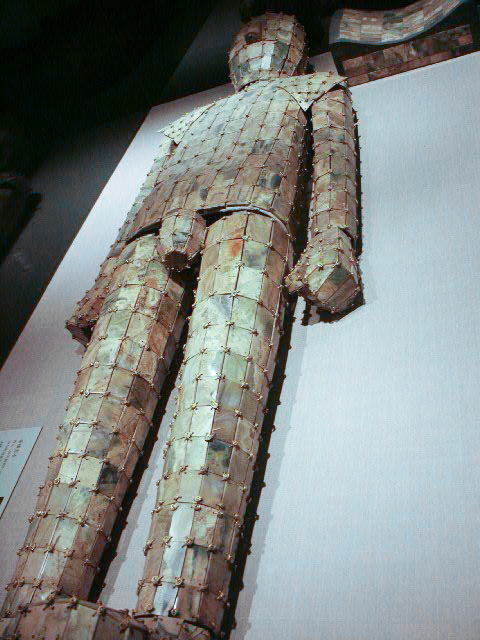
A Han dynasty jade burial suit laced with gold thread at the National Museum of China

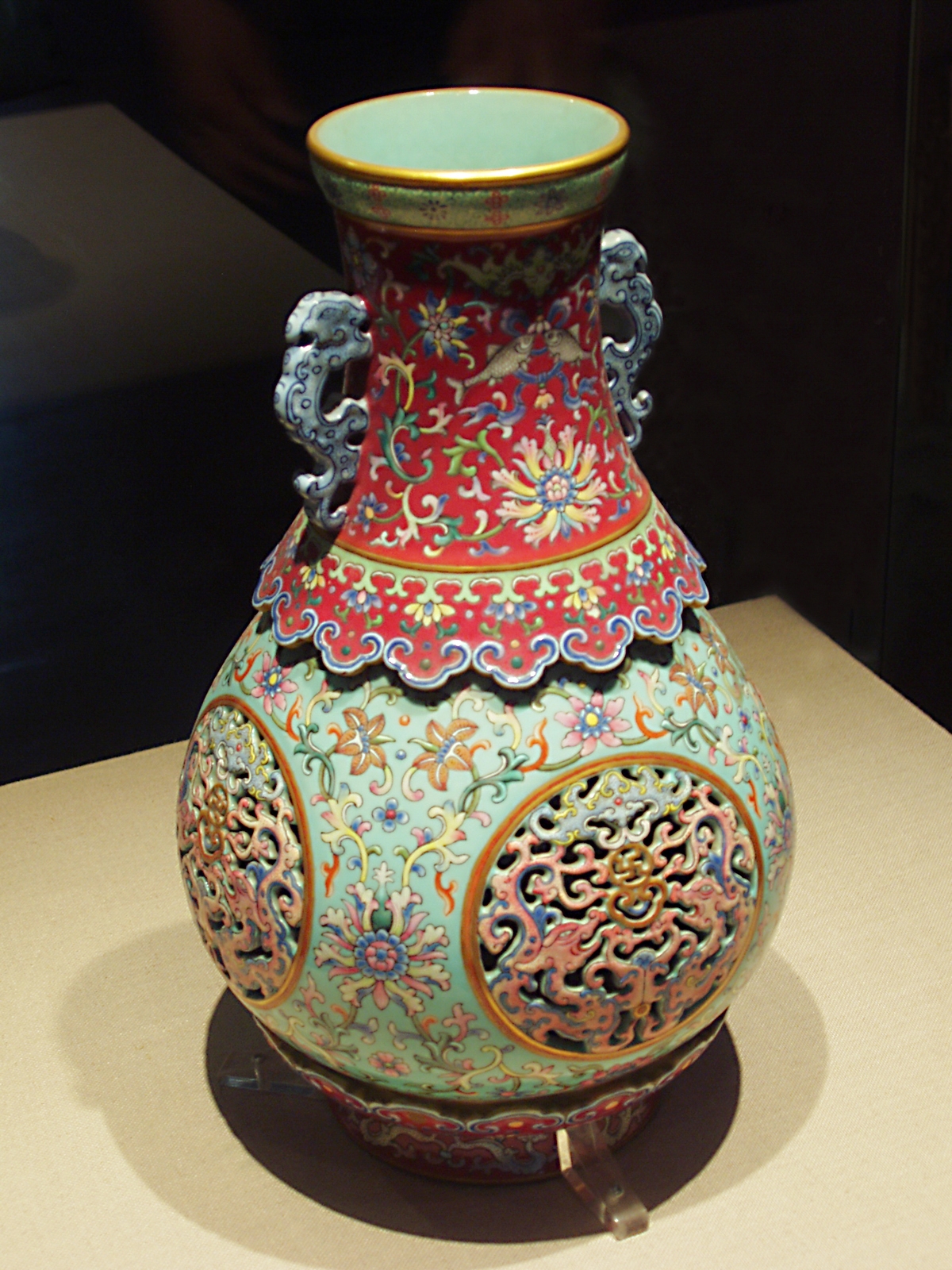
A pastel pierced porcelain vase, from the Qianlong era of the Qing dynasty

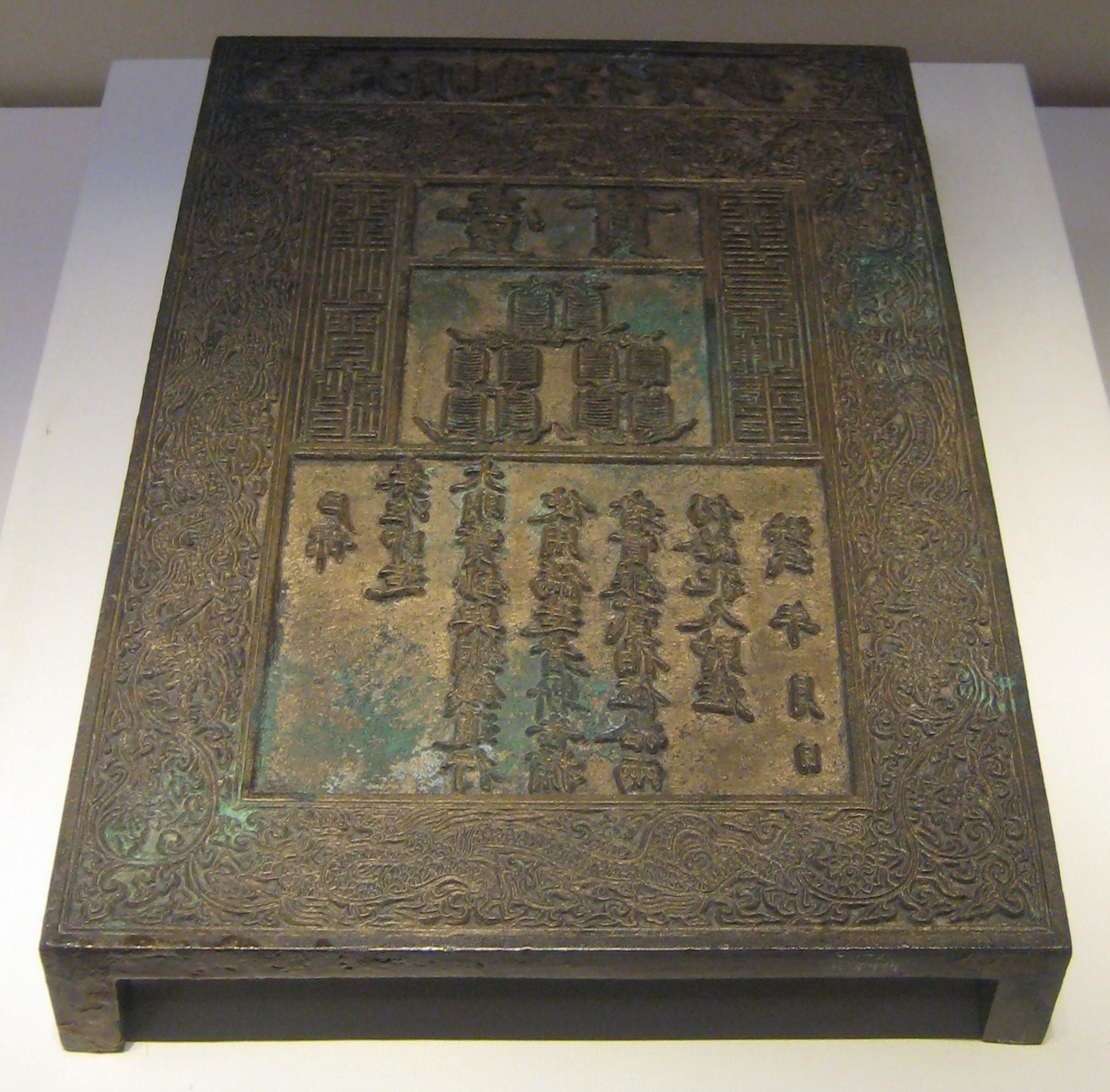
Copperplate for printing the Great Ming one string banknote

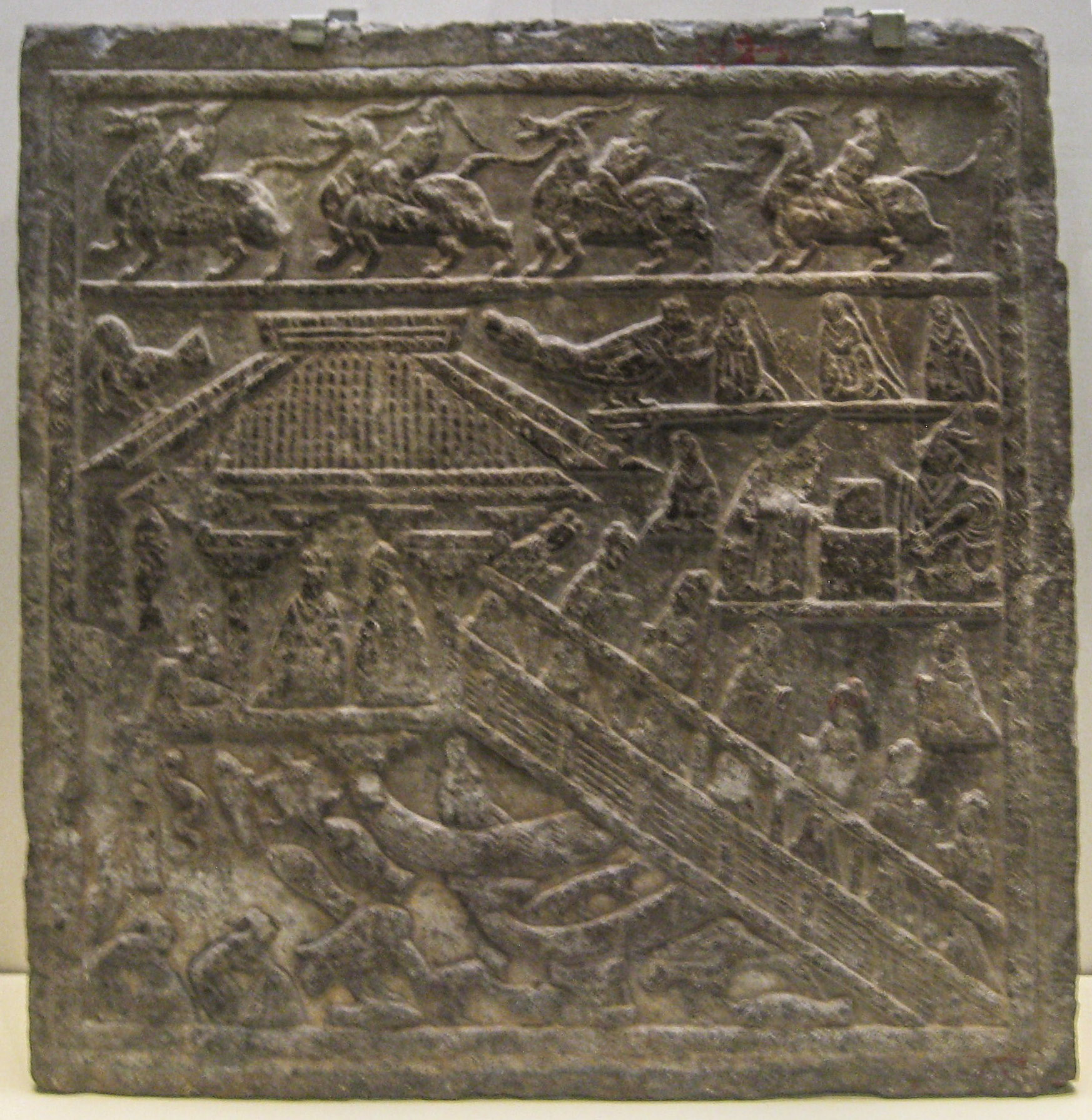
Stone carving from the Eastern Han dynasty, with depiction of a waterside pavilion overlooking a lake full of fish, turtles, and waterfowl

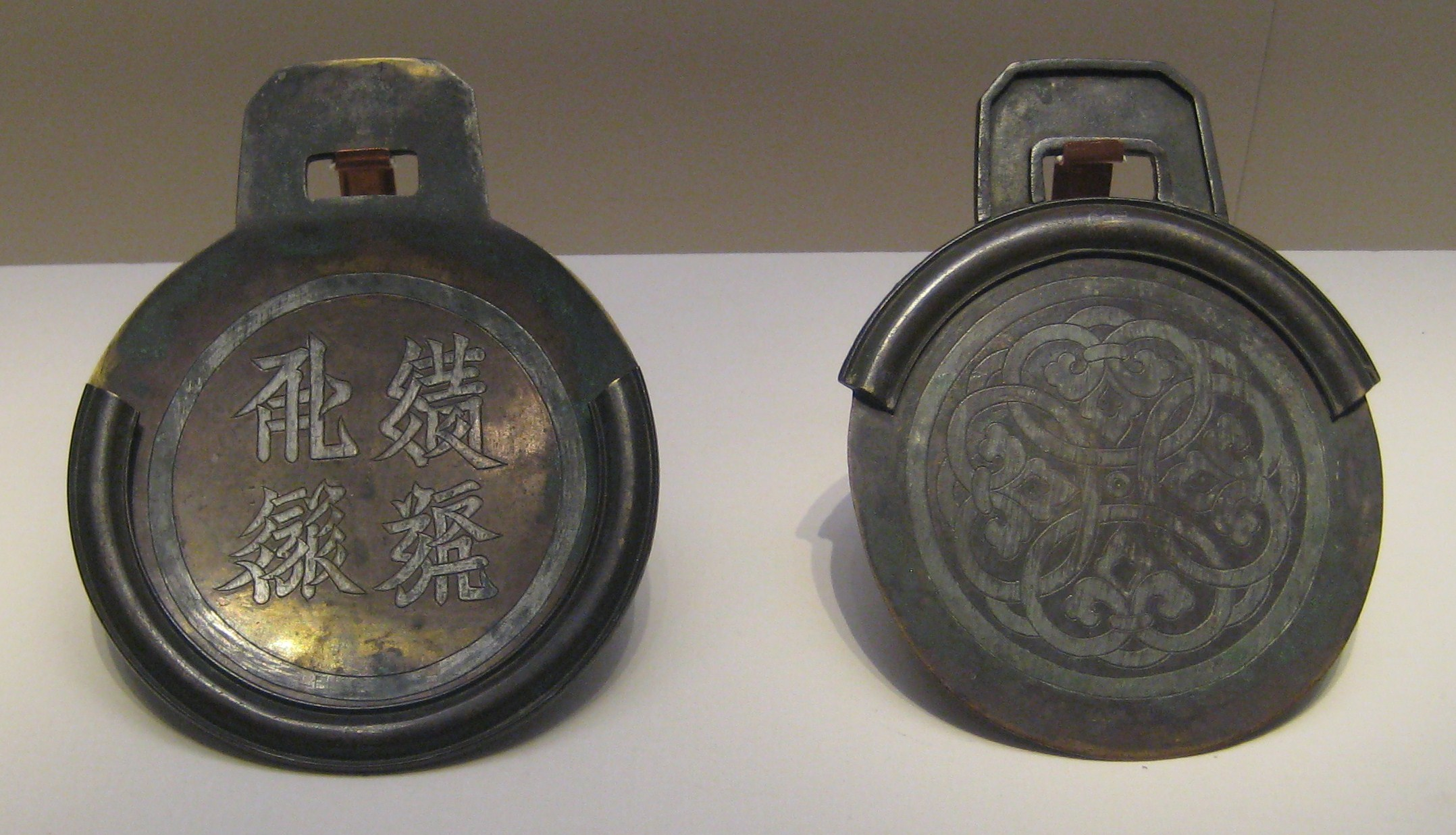
Bronze two-part pass (paizi) with a four character Tangut inscription inlaid in silver, from the Western Xia

A bronze vessel in the shape of an owl, from the tomb of Lady Fu Hao, from Shang dynasty, 13th century BC

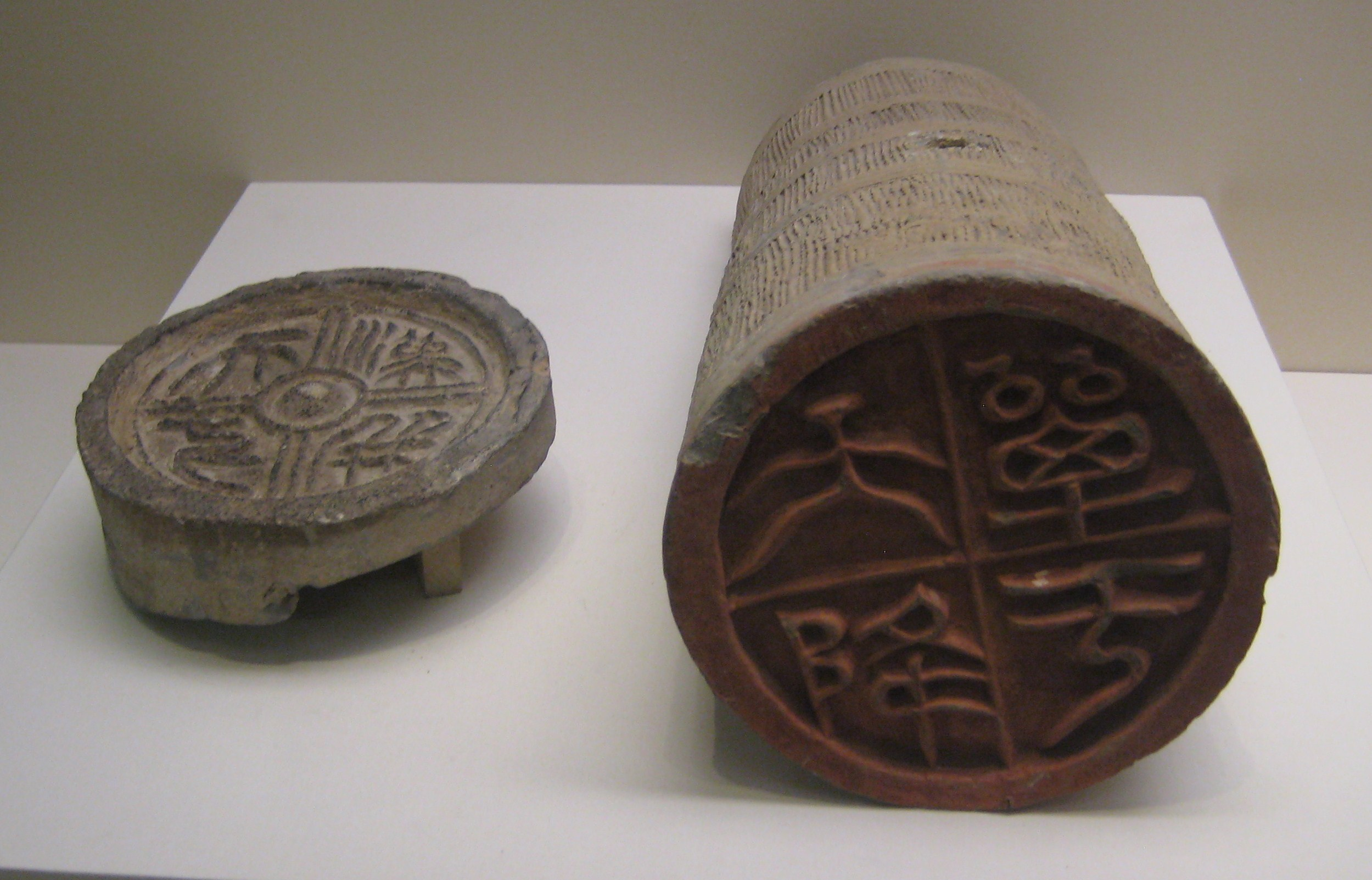
Pottery roof tile ends from the Western Han dynasty

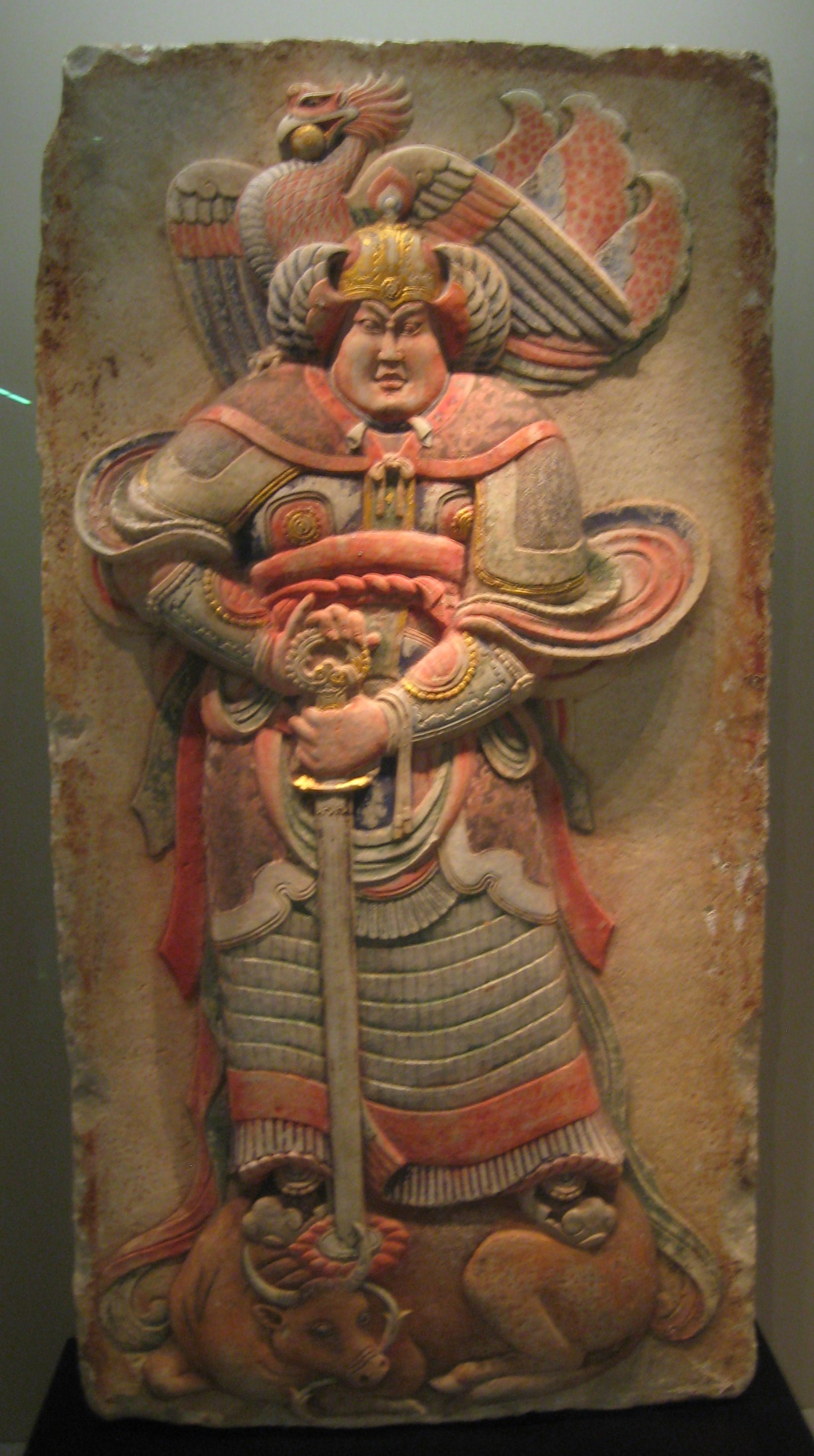
Painted stone relief depicting a warrior from the Later Liang dynasty

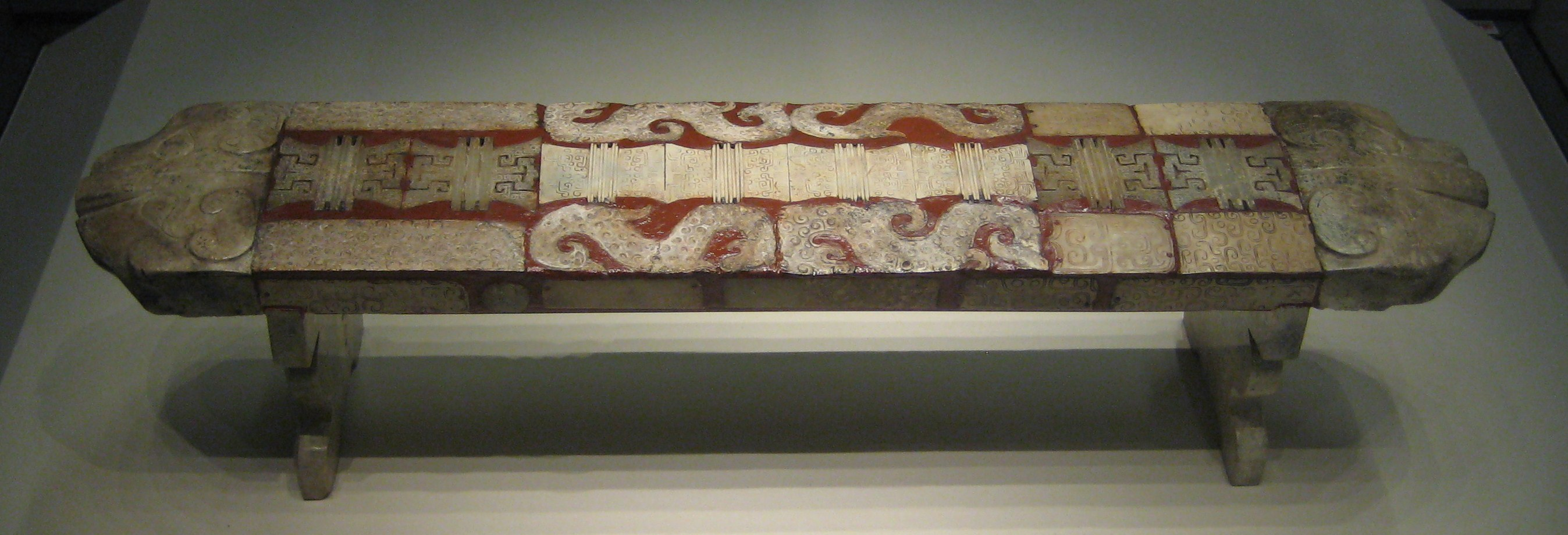
A Western Han dynasty jade pillow from the tomb of the Prince of Chu in Shizishan, Xuzhou, Jiangsu province

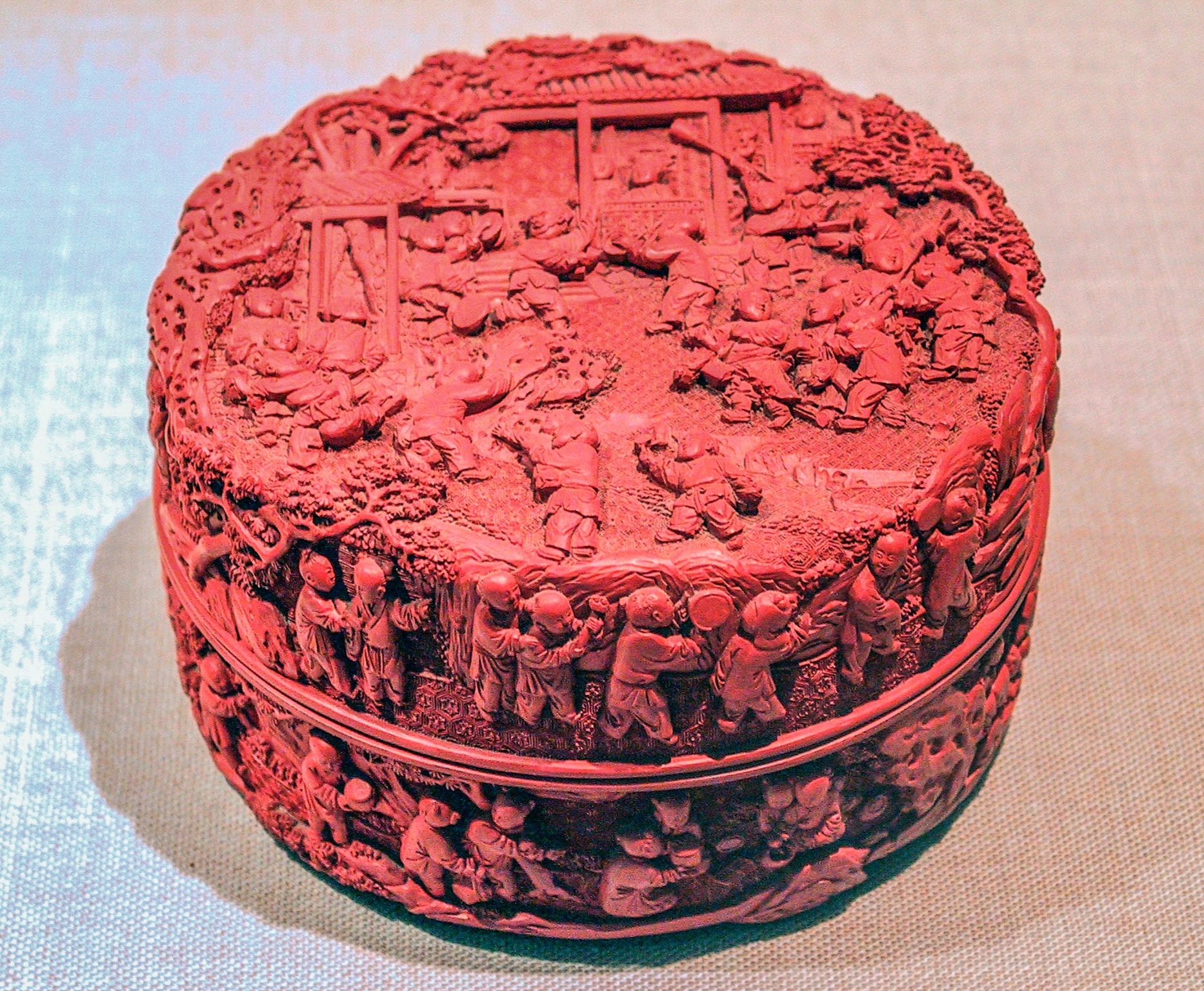
Red lacquer box from the Qing dynasty

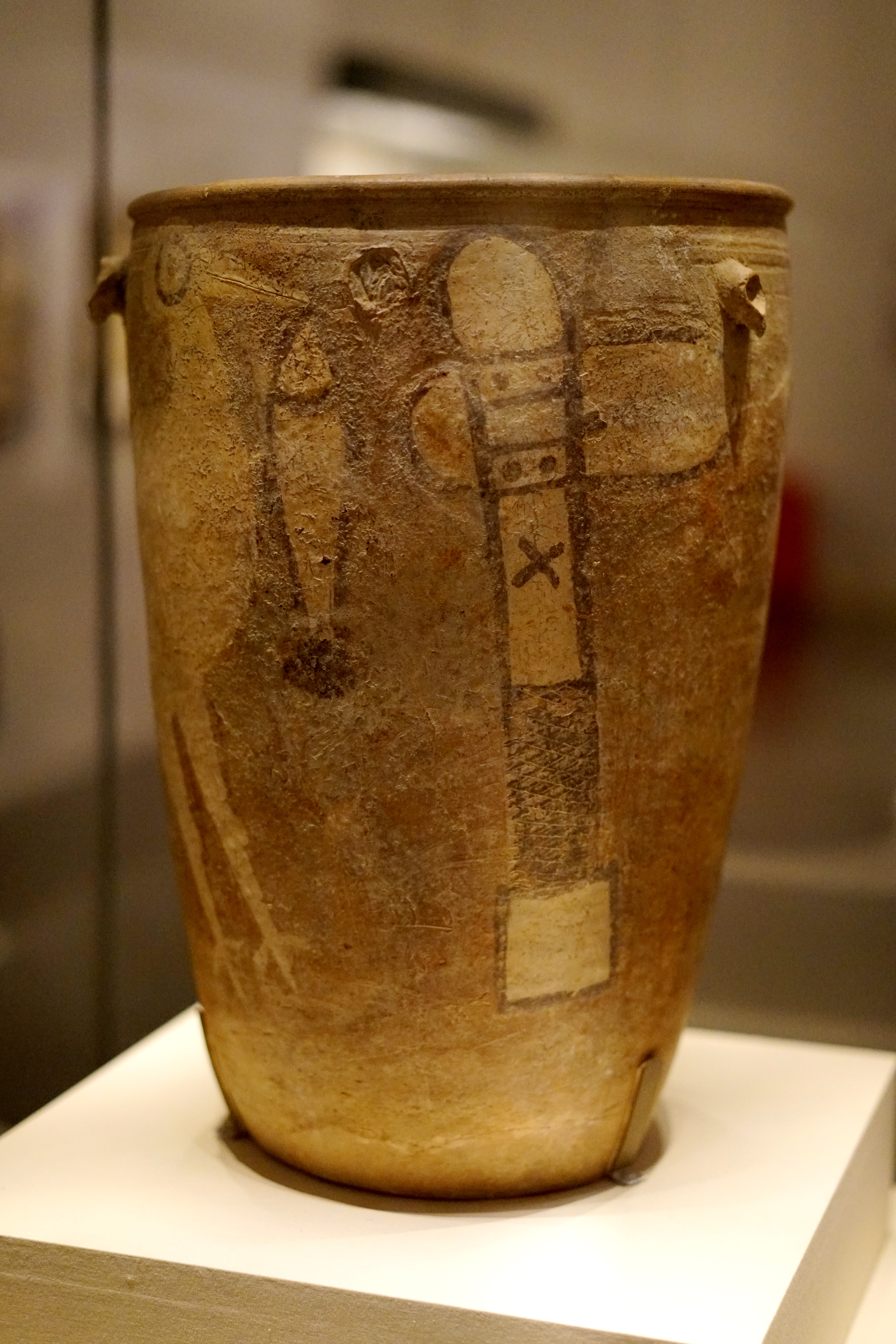
Painted pottery of Neolithic Yangshao culture, with depiction of a stork catching a fish and a stone axe on the side

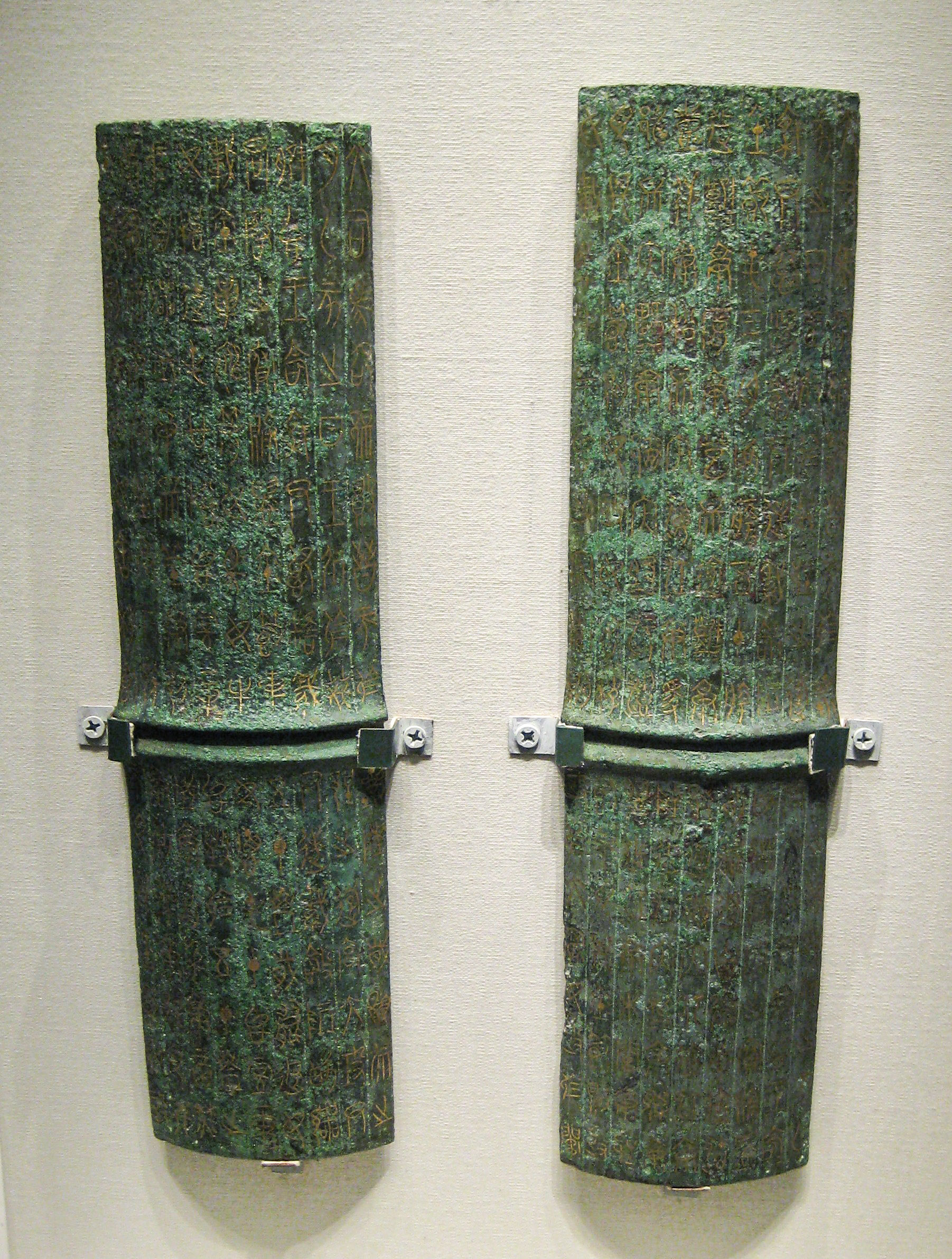
Bronze tallies with inscriptions inlaid in gold from the Warring States period, Chu State

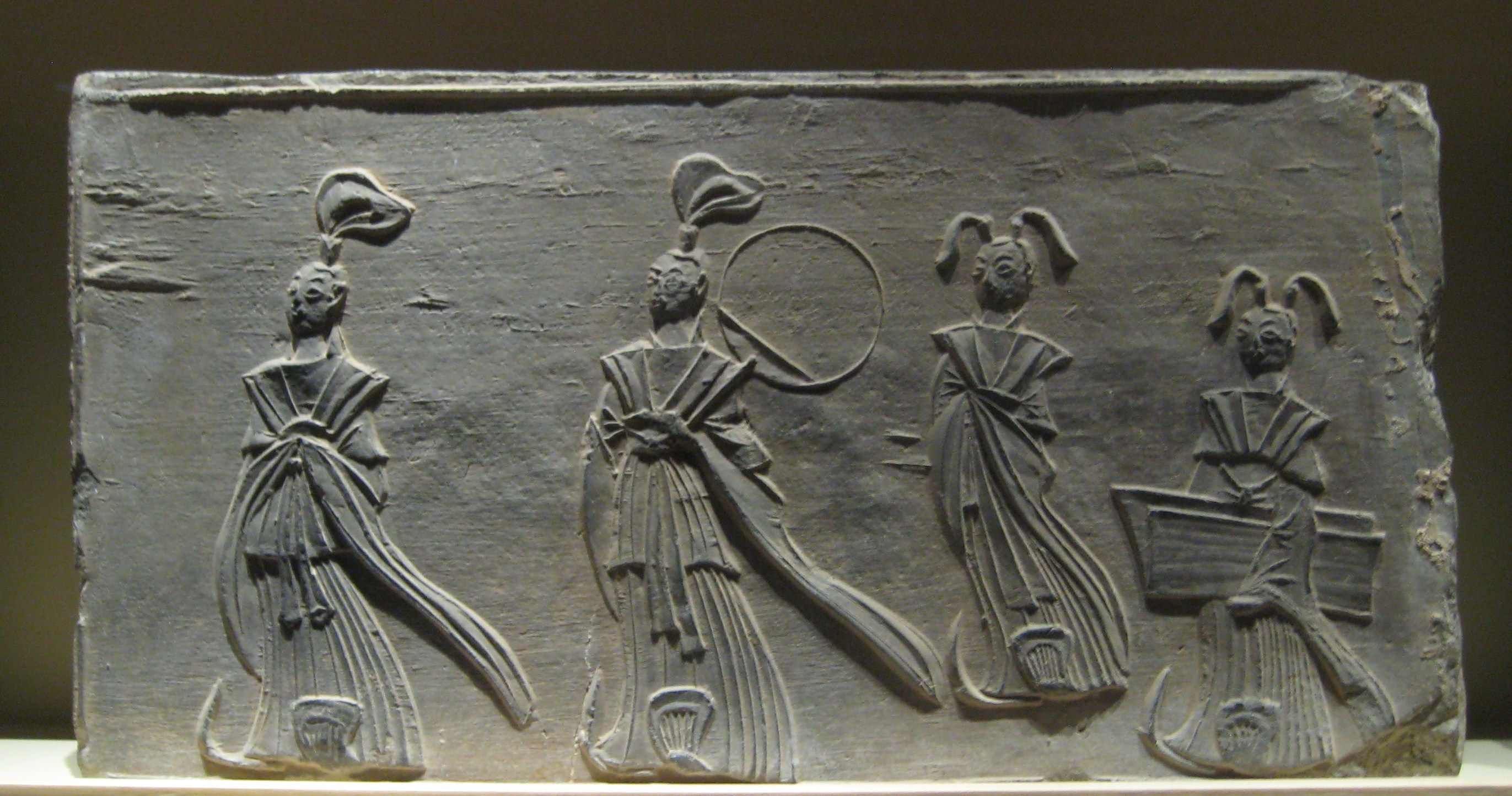
Brick relief depicting two scholars and two maids, from the Southern dynasties

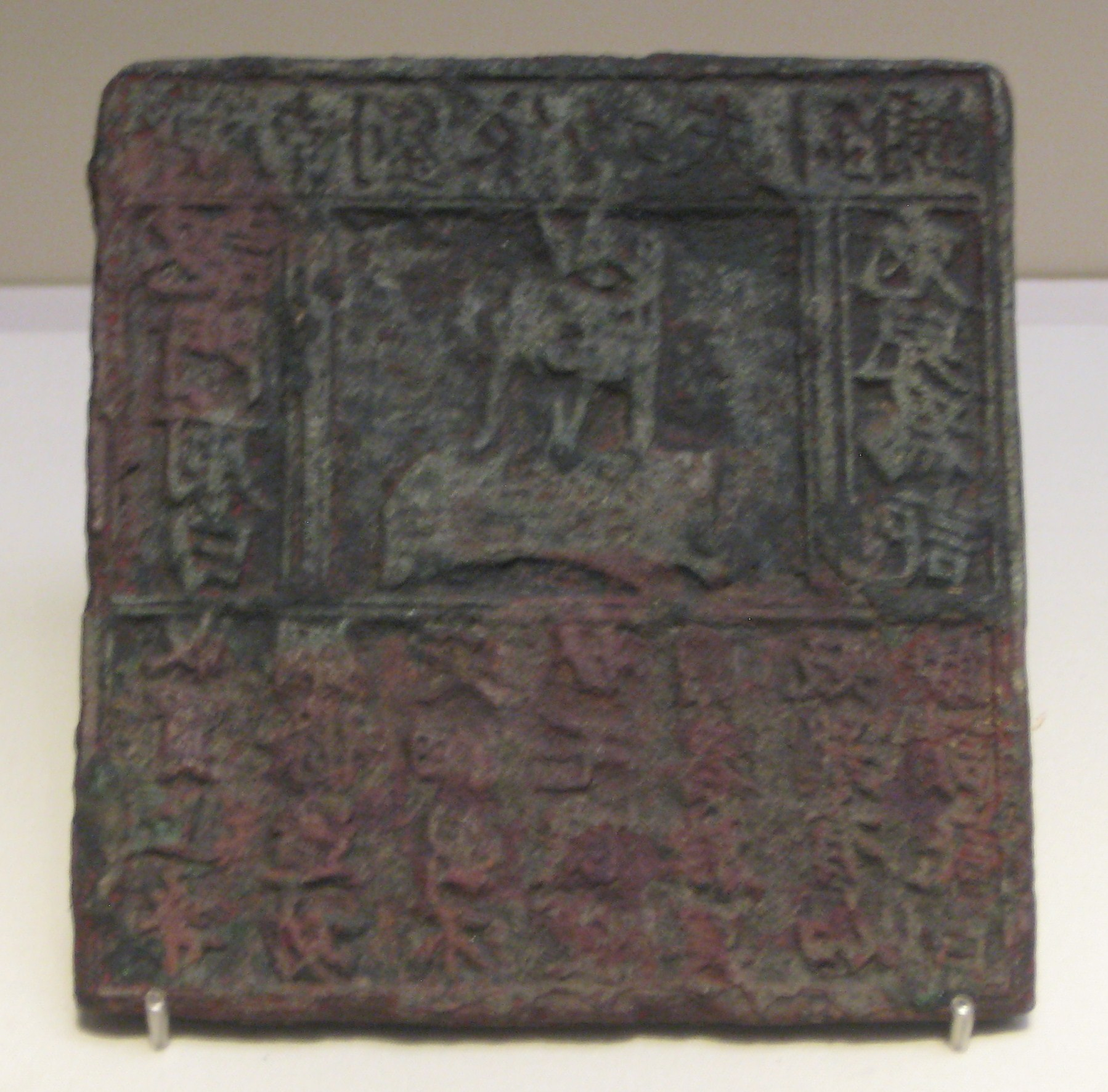
Bronze plate for printing an advertisement for the Liu family needle shop at Jinan, Song dynasty. The earliest extant example of a commercial advertisement

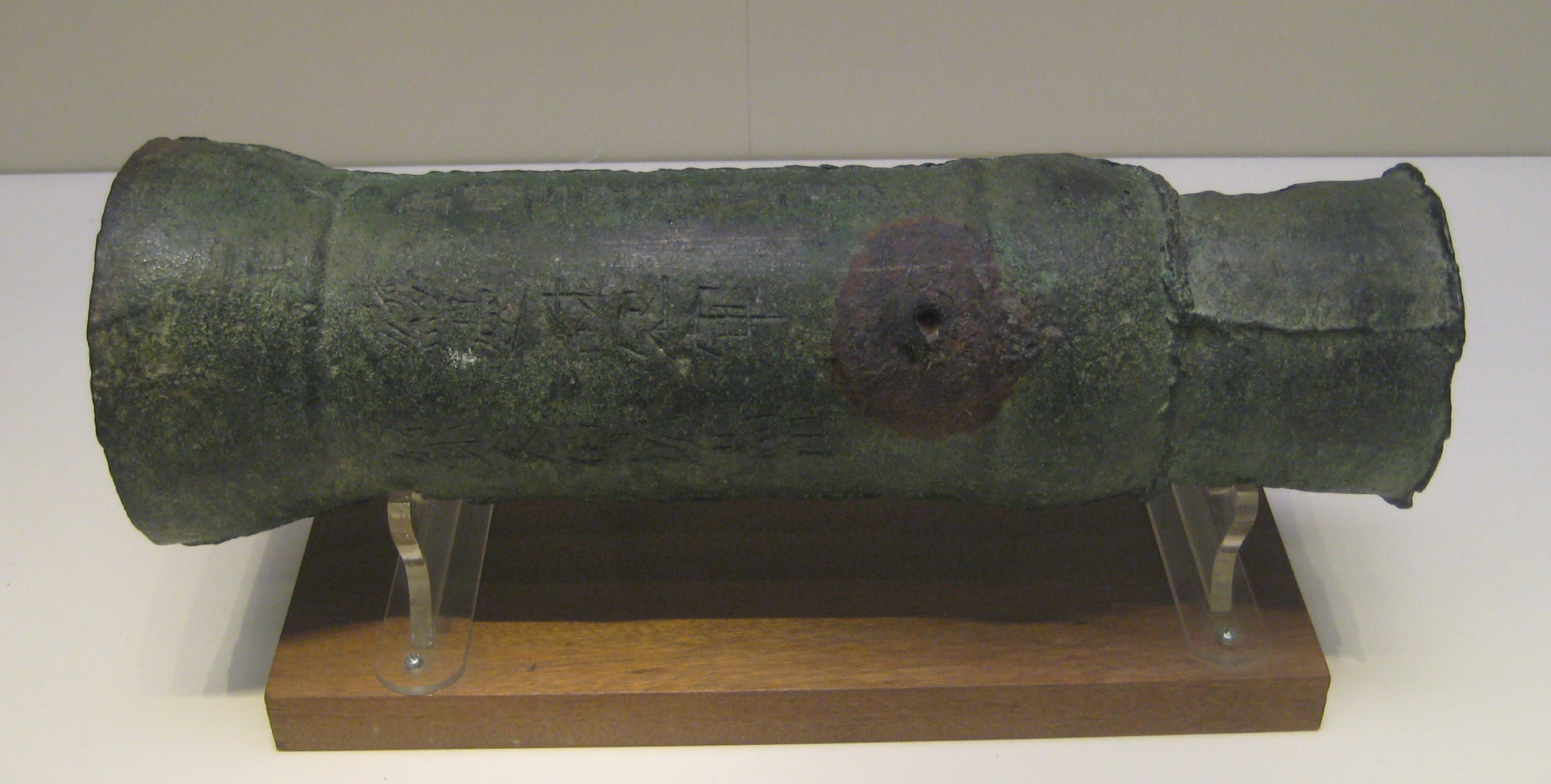
Bronze cannon with inscription dated the 3rd year of the Zhiyuan Era (1332), Yuan dynasty

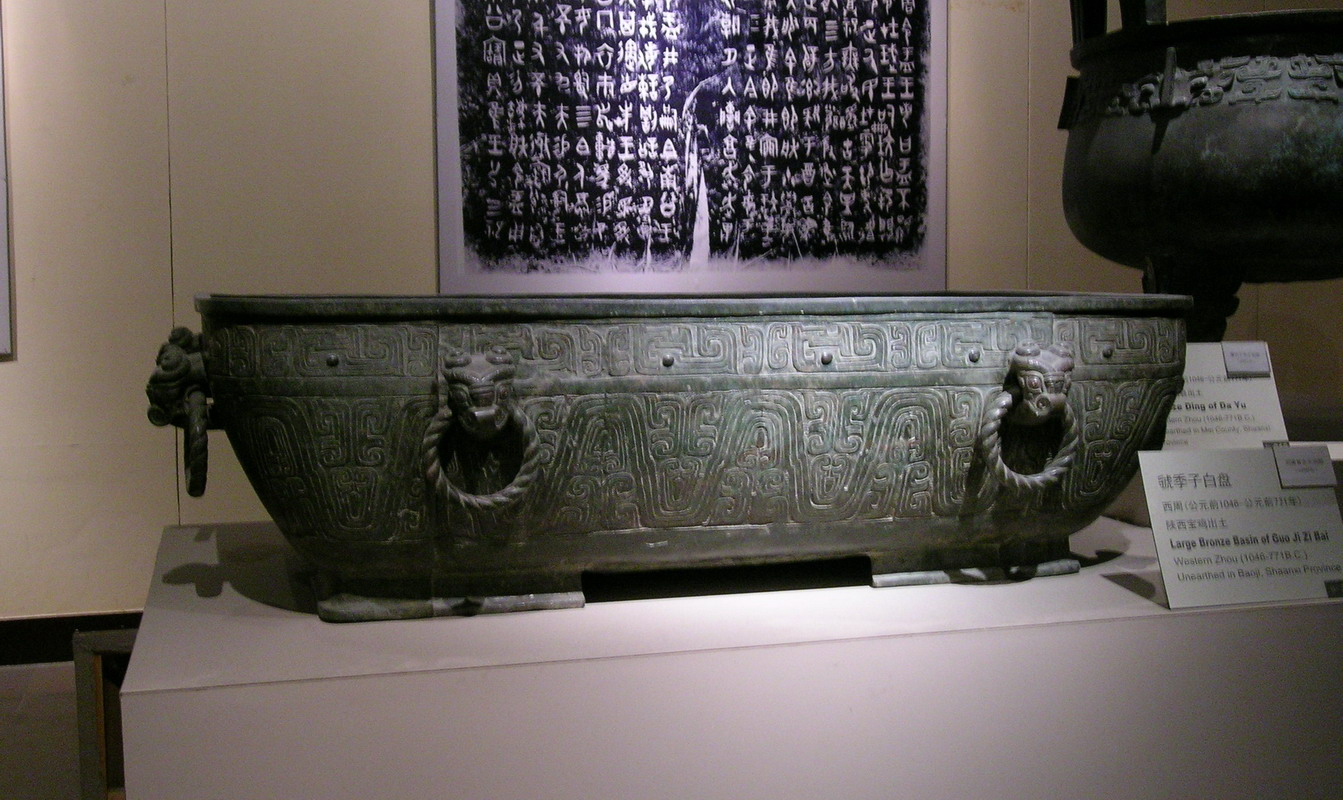
Guoji Zibai pan, from Western Zhou

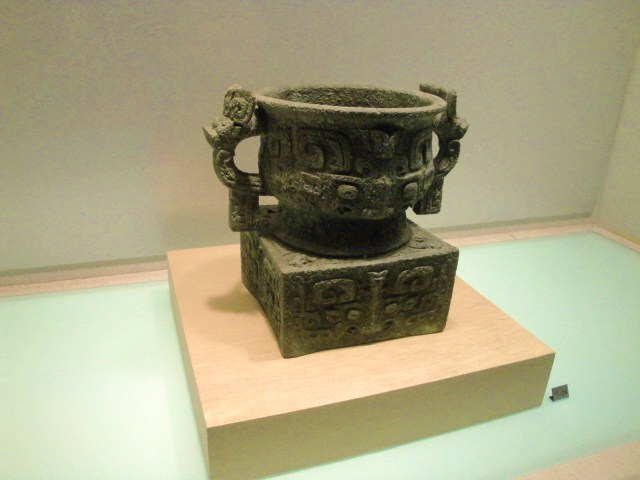
Li gui, the earliest Zhou dynasty bronze vessel to be discovered, and the only epigraphic evidence of the day of the Zhou conquest of Shang

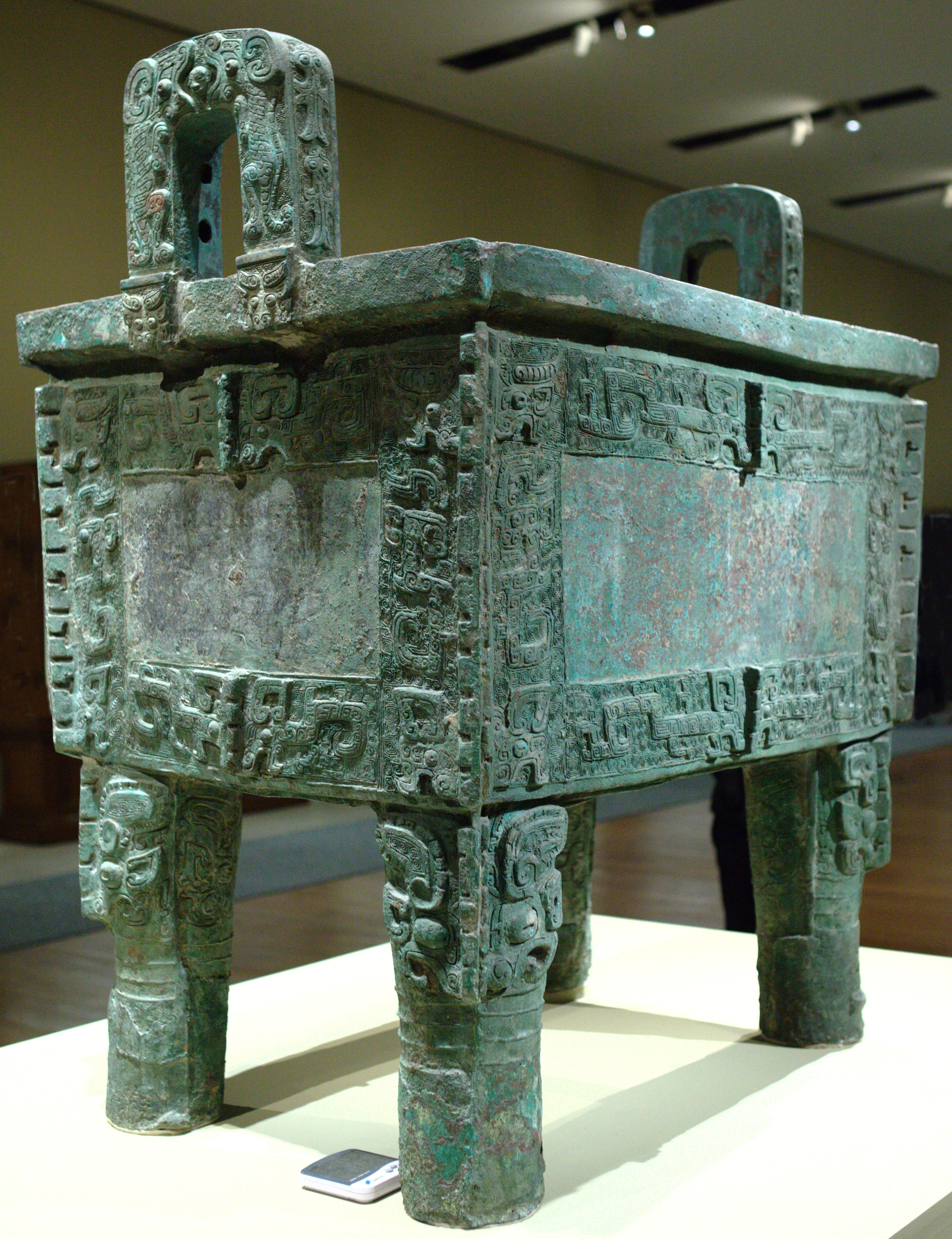
Houmuwu Ding, the largest piece of bronze work found in the world so far. It was made in the late Shang dynasty at Anyang

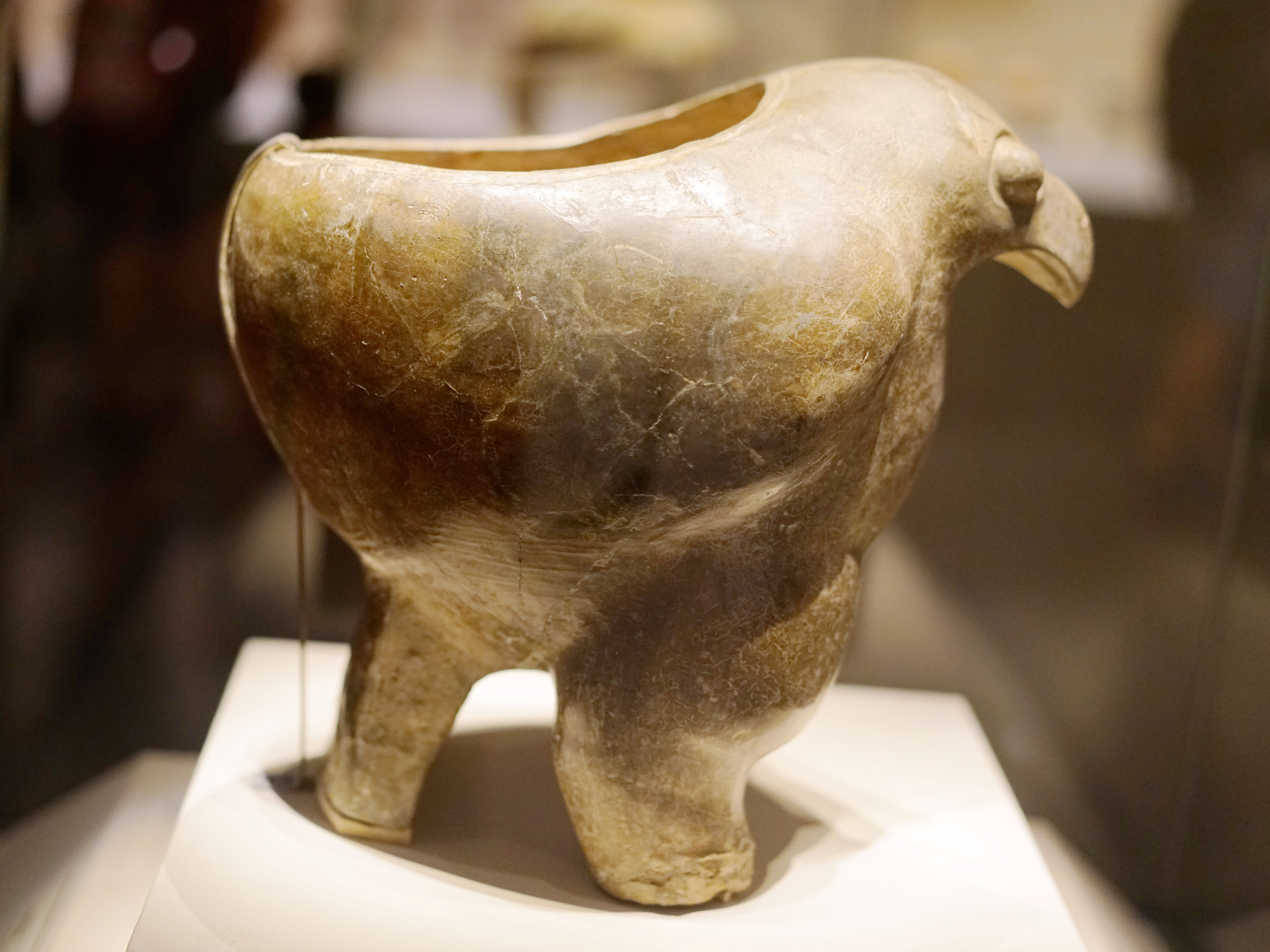
Eagle-shaped pottery of neolithic Yangshao culture

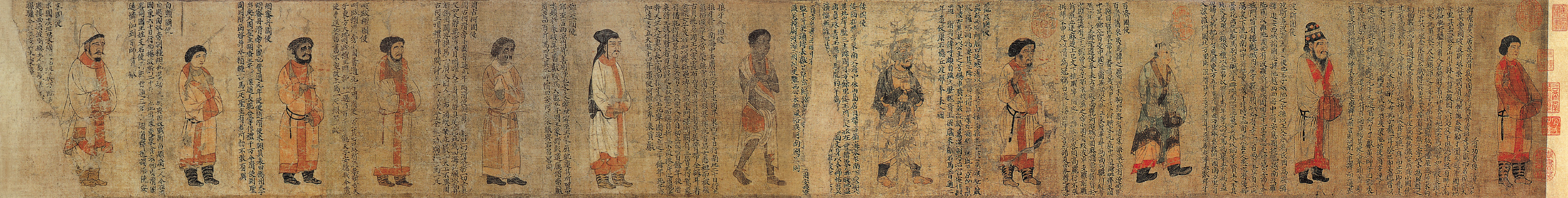
A Song dynasty copy of the Portraits of Periodical Offering of Liang, dated to the 6th century, depicting ambassadors from various tributary states

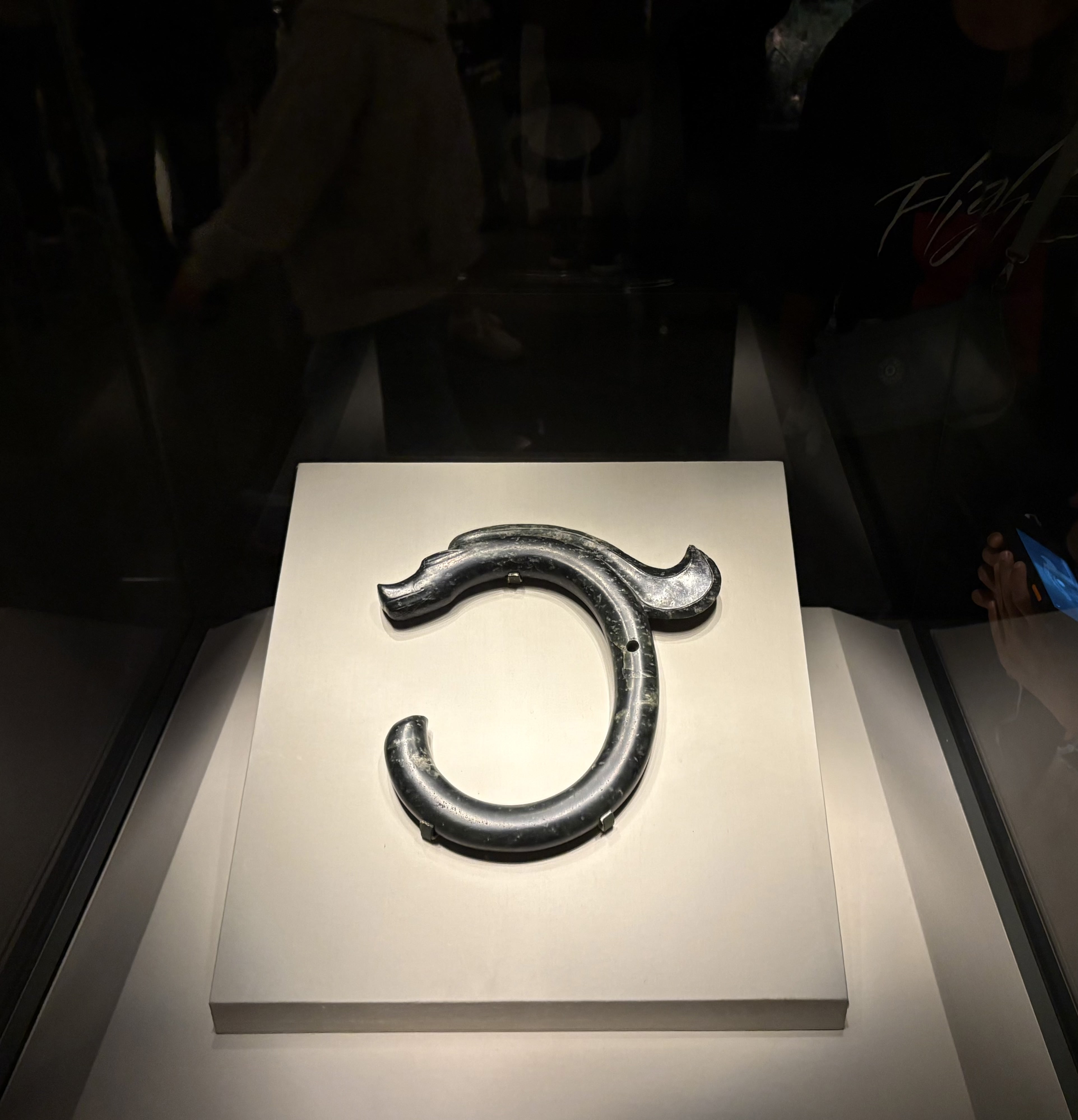
A Stylized Carving of a Dragon in Jade, Neolithic, Hongshan Culture

== Countdown clocks ==
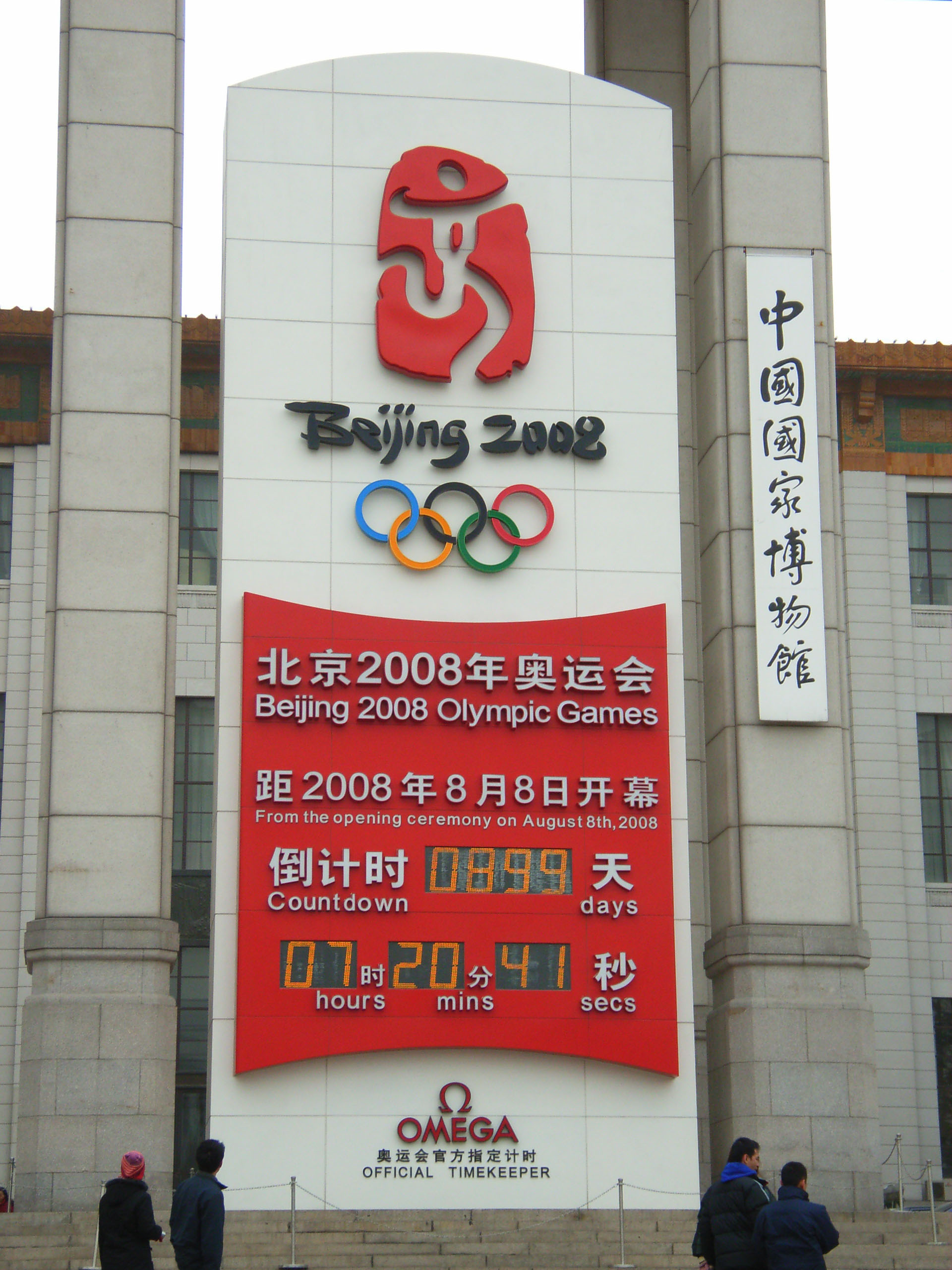
The countdown clock for the beginning of the 2008 Beijing Olympics

Because of its central location in Tiananmen Square, the front of the museum has been used since the 1990s for the display of countdown clocks relating to occasions of national importance, including the 1997 transfer of sovereignty over Hong Kong, the 1999 transfer of sovereignty over Macau, the beginning of the 2008 Beijing Olympics, and the opening of the 2010 World Expo in Shanghai.

== Controversies ==
A three-month exhibition of the luxury brand Louis Vuitton in 2011 led to some complaints of commercialism at the museum, with Peking University professor Xia Xueluan stating that as a state-level public museum, it "should in fact only be dedicating itself to non-profit cultural promotion." Yves Carcelle, chairman and chief executive officer of Louis Vuitton Malletier, defended the exhibition by stating: "What's important is what you are going to discover. I think before money, there's history: 157 years of creativity and craftsmanship."

Some critics have also alleged the museum's modern historiography tends to focus on the triumphs of the CCP, while minimizing or ignoring politically sensitive subjects such as the Great Leap Forward and the Cultural Revolution.

== See also ==
- List of largest art museums
- List of most visited art museums
- List of museums in China
- Palace Museum
- National Palace Museum
- State Administration of Cultural Heritage
- Ministry of Culture

== Bibliography ==
- Kirk A. Denton, Exhibiting the Past: Historical Memory and the Politics of Museums in Postsocialist China (University of Hawaii Press, 2014), pp. 33–39, 45–74.
