= Luo Bozhao =

Luo Bozhao (Chinese: 羅伯昭; Wade–Giles: Lo Po-chao; 1899–1976) was a Chinese numismatist. He was also known as Wenjiong (文炯), Muyuan (沐園) and P. C. Low.

== Life ==
Luo was born in Chongqing, Sichuan Province. After graduating from St. John's University, Shanghai, he engaged in business, exporting tung oil from Sichuan to the United States, the profits of which enabled him to fund his passion for collecting and researching coins. After the founding of the People's Republic of China in 1949, Luo served as a people's representative of the Shanghai Municipality (1950-1966) and Deputy Director of the Huangpu District (1961-1966).

He was persecuted during the Cultural Revolution, forced to sweep the streets.

== Numismatic career ==
In 1940 Luo was one of co-founders of the China Numismatic Society (Zhongguo Quanbi Xueshe 中国泉币学社) in Shanghai. He was Vice-President of the Society, and authored 100 articles in the 32 issues of the society's journal. He wrote many more articles, but lost a lot of his work in the Cultural Revolution. In 1956 he donated his entire collection of coins (over 15,000 coins) to National Museum of Chinese History. He subsequently donated over 800 coins to the Shanghai Museum and the Sichuan Provincial Museum.

== Publications ==
- 《沐園四十泉拓》 (Rubbings of 40 coins in the Muyuan Collection) (Shanghai, 1989)
- 《羅伯昭錢幣學文集》 (Collection of articles on numismatics by Luo Bozhao), ed. by Ma Feihai 马飞海, Zhou Xiang 周祥, and Luo Jiong 罗炯 (Shanghai, 2004)
