= Sinyan Shen =

American physicist

Sinyan Shen (Chinese: 沈星扬; born November 12, 1949 - died November 7, 2016) was a Singaporean physicist and classical composer.

== Life ==
Born in Singapore to the parents of Shanghai background, Sinyan Shen studied music at a very early age and mastered the vertical fiddle family of instruments. His dual career in music and physics culminated in the development of cultural acoustics, a discipline addressing scientifically the cultural molding of our ears and brain to music. Shen's life work centered on the essence of music.

Shen, who lived in Illinois, taught cultural acoustics at Northwestern University and Harvard University. He was a music director of the Silk and Bamboo Ensemble and the Chinese Classical Orchestra. Both ensembles toured internationally under the auspices of the Chinese Music Society of North America, but have not performed publicly since 2006. Shen was an editor of the international journal Chinese Music, music authority for the Encyclopædia Britannica, and a Fulbright Scholar. He served as a technical advisor for the Shanghai Musical Instrument Factory. He died in Palo Alto, California at the age of 67, several years after suffering a debilitating stroke.

== Works ==
Shen's works include A Tune of Southern Anhui and Moon over the Western Water (for silk and bamboo ensemble), Lily Blossoms Crimson and Bright (for Chinese classical orchestra), and The Stream (vocal). He is the author of What Makes Chinese Music Chinese?, Foundations of the Chinese Orchestra, Acoustics of Ancient Chinese Bells, Chinese Music and Orchestration: A Primer on Principles and Practice, and China: A Journey Into Its Musical Arts and Chinese Musical Instruments.

Orchestral works performed or recorded by Shen Sinyan:

- A Tune of Southern Anhui
- Moon over the Western Water
- Lily Blossoms Crimson and Bright
- The Stream
- Clouds and Mists over the Xiao and Xiang Rivers (XiaoXiang ShuiYun)
- Wild Geese Descending on the Sandy Shores
- Ambush on All Sides
- Wailful Wrath by the River (Jiang He Shui)
- Music at Sunset
- Flower and Moon over the Spring River
- Days of Emancipation
- By the Qiantang River
- Listen to the Pine
- The Moon on High
- The Dance of Yao
- Song North of the Border (Sai Shang Qu),
- Galloping on the Prairie
- Ma-An Mountain Overture,
- Moon Over the Mountain Pass
- The Moon Mirrored in Erquan
- Jasmine Blossom
- Birds Return to the Woods
- Moderately Embellished Six Measures
- Wedding Processional
- Purple Bamboo Melody
- Unforgettable Water Splashing Festival
- Spring at the Emerald Lake
- Rain Falls on the Plantains
- The Little Cowherd
- Plum Blossom (Meihua Sannong)
- The Great Wall
- Fishing Song of the East China Sea
- Fantasy on the Sanmen Gorge
- The Dagger Society Suite
- Receiving My Kinsmen
- On the Prairie
