= Ministry of Culture (China) =

Former PRC government ministry

Ministry of Culture of the People's Republic of China
- 中华人民共和国文化部; Zhōnghuá Rénmín Gònghéguó Wénhuàbù
- National Emblem of China

Agency overview
- Formed: September 1954; 72 years ago
- Dissolved: 19 March 2018; 8 years ago
- Superseding agency: Ministry of Culture and Tourism
- Jurisdiction: China
- Headquarters: Beijing
- Minister responsible: Luo Shugang, last Minister
- Parent agency: State Council
- Website: mcprc.gov.cn (archived)

The Ministry of Culture of the People's Republic of China (MCPRC) was a constituent department from 1954 to 2018 of the State Council of China in charge of culture.

The ministry's designated responsibilities encompassed cultural policy and activities in the country, including managing national museums and monuments; promoting and protecting the arts (including censorship of visual, folk, theatrical, musical, dance, architectural, literary, televisual and cinematographic works); and managing the national archives and regional culture centers. Its headquarters were in Chaoyang District, Beijing. On 19 March 2018, it was merged with the China National Tourism Administration to establish the Ministry of Culture and Tourism.

== History ==
In November 1949, the Ministry issued a directive criticizing traditional nianhua for expressing feudal values. The Ministry called for the production of nianhua with revolutionary themes like the "great victory of the people's war of liberation" or "the life and struggles of ordinary labouring people."

In 1955, the Ministry of Culture sought to develop rural cultural networks to distribute media like other performances, lantern slides, books, cinema, radio, books, and to establish newspaper reading groups.

On March 9, 1958, the Ministry of Culture held a meeting to introduce a Great Leap Forward in cinema. During the Great Leap Forward, the film industry rapidly expanded, with documentary films being the genre that experienced the greatest growth. The number of film-screening venues, including both urban cinemas and mobile projectionist units that traveled through rural China, also radically increased during this period.

In 1963, the Ministry of Culture banned ghost plays. It allowed for exceptions, stating that plays based on legend and myth should not be banned, and that the decision to ban plays outright or revise them to remove ghost scenes should be made at the local and provincial levels in consultation between local cultural bureaus and performers.

Mao Zedong eventually developed the belief that the Ministry of Culture focused too much on elite art and foreign art. In 1963, he mocked the Ministry by stating that "[i]f nothing else is done, the Ministry of Culture should be changed into the Ministry of Emperors, Kings, Generals, Ministers, Scholars and Beauties, or the Ministry of Foreign Things and the Dead."

In 1965, Lu Dingyi took over as minister of culture from Mao Dun.

As political tensions increased in the period leading to the Cultural Revolution, Xiao Wangdong of the PLA's General Political Department was brought into the ministry to stabilize it and invigorate the left. He brought in colleagues from the military to assist in this effort, which was not deemed as successful. In 1970 the communist party deemed the cultural politics of the Ministry so disruptive that it was dissolved and a Culture Group was established within the State Council. It was re-established as a ministry in 1975.

During Reform and Opening Up, the Ministry's relative power over culture policy increased as the power of other parts of the bureaucracy dealing with culture declined.

Deng Xiaoping's view was that state cultural organizations should have the goal of becoming self-financing. The Ministry's first unit to earn its own money was China National Symphony Orchestra, which did so by recording movie sound tracks.

In 1986, the film bureau was removed from the Ministry of Culture; it formed part of the new Ministry of Radio, Film, and Television.

In 1998, the Ministry of Culture revived the practice of mobile rural cinema as part of its 2131 Project which aimed to screen one movie month per village in rural China and upgrade analog equipment to digital projectors.

The ministry was dissolved on 19 March 2018 and replaced by the Ministry of Culture and Tourism as part of the deepening the reform of the Party and state institutions.

== Duties ==
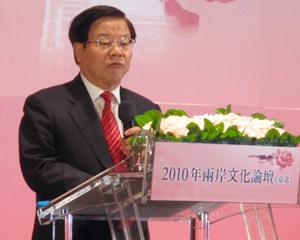
Cai Wu, former Minister of Culture

The Ministry operated an extensive network of arts organizations. These included opera companies, symphonies, conservatories, and arts academies. The Ministry's organizational structure was replicated across provinces and included cultural bureaus in each county in China. These cultural bureaus operated neighborhood cultural centres.

The Ministry disseminated many arts publications.

The duties of the ministry included digitizing and preserving public domain works, and making them available and accessible to every citizen. China had millions of public domain works, including but not limited to books, pictures, music and films.

Its headquarters were in Chaoyang District, Beijing.

== See also ==
- China Arts and Entertainment Group
- National first-class library
