= Chinese Music Society of North America =

The Chinese Music Society of North America (CMSNA) was organized in 1969 and was officially founded in 1976 as a federal non-profit international organization to increase and diffuse the knowledge of Chinese music and performing arts. Today it has grown to become the national association of musicians and scholars and National and International organization specializing in Research and Educational Material in English (Special Reports, Monographs, Pictures/Slides, Journal Publications, Archaeological Finds, Cultural Relics) concerning Music/Theater/Dance and Musical Instruments of China and Non-Western Cultures.

The Membership of the Society comprises Associate Members, Ordinary Members and Sustaining Members. Any person or institution interested in Chinese music is eligible for election to Associate Membership on written application to the Secretary on a prescribed form. A person with appropriate background experience and active in the field of Chinese Music may apply for transfer to Ordinary Membership in his or her second year of Associate Membership. Sustaining Membership is available for corporations and other organizations interested in materially supporting the publications and activities of the Society. The Society sends all members without charge its official international journal, Chinese Music.

Chinese Music is the international quarterly journal devoted to Chinese music, with articles covering all phases of research of Chinese music and performance activities in Chinese music. It is regarded as the most prestigious authority in sources of Chinese music research. Numerous discoveries relating to Chinese music were first reported in Chinese Music before they became publicly known. It also contains news items of general interest to the music community and the public, as well as book and recording reviews. Chinese Music is the only journal in the world devoted wholly to theoretical and applied Chinese music.

Chinese Music provides a forum for original papers concerned with musicology, musical life, composition, acoustics, analysis, orchestration, musicians, global interactions, intercultural studies, and musical instruments. It also publishes news items of importance to the music community and the general public, as well as book and recording reviews.

The Keywords of Chinese Music (ISSN 0192-3749): Performing Arts, Music, Theater, Dance, Cultural Relics, World, China, Acoustics, Aesthetics, Music Theory, Ensemble Music, Orchestration, Structure, Formal Design, Compositions, Analysis, Musicology, History, Criticism, Musicians, Musical Instruments, Instrumental Music.

Chinese Music (ISSN 0192-3749) is distributed to 167 Countries.

The Society coordinates field projects and conferences which bring about interaction among Chinese music enthusiasts from all over the world. Its membership now include music supporters and researchers from 168 countries. Members are therefore provided with many opportunities to interact with prominent experts in Chinese music on an international scale.
