= China Arts and Entertainment Group =

- Industry: Creative industries
- Founded: April 5, 2004
- Headquarters: People's Republic of China

China Arts and Entertainment Group (CAEG) was created on April 5, 2004, with the merger of the China Performing Arts Agency (1957) and the China International Exhibition Agency (1950) to become the largest state-owned creative enterprise in China. It was a major step to transform Chinese cultural and art institutions into modern enterprises.

CAEG is under the administration of the Minister of Culture. The group consists of 19 wholly owned enterprises, two shareholding enterprises and one stock company.

== See also ==
- Creative industries

China Arts & Entertainment Group
As the first large-scale state-level arts and entertainment group of enterprises approved by the State Council, China Arts and Entertainment Group (CAEG) was set up in April 2004 on the basis of China Performing Arts Agency (CPPA) and China International Exhibition Agency (CIEA), both formerly under China's Ministry of Culture. CAEG has the China State Council as investor, the Ministries of Culture and Finance as administrative supervisor and state-assets supervisor respectively.

CAEG owns 19 wholly owned subsidiaries and also many holding subsidiaries and joint-stock subsidiaries. The group's core companies, China Performing Arts Agency (CPPA) and China International Exhibition Agency (CIEA), were set up in 1957 and 1950 respectively and are the biggest supplier and organizer of China's international performing arts and art exhibitions. As China's only global runner of show productions and art exhibitions, CAEG is among the first 35 units of cultural administrative reform and is listed as Advanced Unit of National Cultural Administrative Reform in 2008.
CAEG has set up a development strategy of integrating cultural resources- creating industry chain-building brand-name products- expanding cultural exports. Talent and capital strategies are also planned to attain this goal. CAEG would join hand with person from all walks of life both at home and abroad to build win-win cooperative relationships on wide range and strive for a prosperous era of China's Cultural Creative Industry.

Main Activities Hosted by CAEG:

- Meet in Beijing Arts Festival
- Asia Arts Festival
- China International Chorus Festival
- China Pavilion of Biennale in Venice and St. Paul

Main Businesses of CAEG are:

- Organizing inter-governmental cultural exchange programs entrusted by the Ministry of Culture;
- Planning and organizing large-scale cultural and art activities in cooperation with international cultural exchange organizations;
- Planning and organizing performances and art exhibitions at home and abroad;
- Investing, producing and promoting large-scale shows;
- Business consultation of performances and art exhibitions at home and abroad;
- Providing services for various cultural activities, including accommodation, hotel, tickets, sightseeing etc.;
- Evaluation, sales, exhibition and duplication of artworks;
- Managing and running of theaters and exhibition hall;
- Ticket sales of shows, sport games and other activities;
- Book publishing.
