= Ding Yi =

Ding Yi may refer to:

== People ==
- Ding Yi (Han dynasty) (died 220), official under the Han dynasty warlord Cao Cao
- Ding Yi (businessman) (1927–2019), founder of Dongfang Electric Corporation
- Ding Yi (admiral) (born 1959), deputy commander of the PLA Navy
- Ding Yi (table tennis) (born 1959), Chinese-born Austrian table tennis player
- Yi Ding (actress) (born 1983), Chinese-born American actress
- Ding Yi (actress) (1942–2000), winner of the best supporting actress award at the 5th Golden Rooster Awards
- Ding Yi (artist) (born 1962), Chinese contemporary artist
- Ding Yi, fictional physicist, protagonist of Ball Lightning and minor character in Remembrance of Earth's Past
- Ding Yi, protagonist in Shi Tiesheng's novel My Sojourn in Ding Yi

== Other uses ==
- Ding Yi Music Company
