= Ding (surname) =

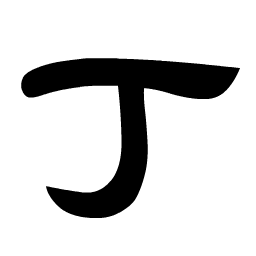
- The Chinese character Ding
- Romanisation: Mandarin: Ding, Ting; Korean: Jeong, Chung; Vietnamese: Đinh

Origin
- Origin: China

Ding (Chinese: 丁; pinyin: Dīng; Wade–Giles: Ting^{¹}) is a Chinese family name. It consists of only 2 strokes. The only two characters that have fewer strokes are "一" and "乙".

== Distribution ==
In 2019 it was the 48th most common surname in mainland China.

== Origins ==
There are four main hypothesized sources of Ding:

- The earliest record of this surname in history was the Duke of Ding during the Shang dynasty.
- The name derived from the ancestral surname Jiang. Duke Ding of Qi was the second recorded ruler of the State of Qi. After his death, his descendants adopted his posthumous name Ding as their clan name in his honor. Most of the people surnamed Ding are his descendants.
- During Spring and Autumn period, the descendants of Duke Ding of Song also used Ding as their last name.
- During the Three Kingdoms period, a general, Sun Kuang of the Wu kingdom, accidentally burnt the food supply and as a punishment, the king Sun Quan ordered this general to change his last name to Ding; the king did not want to bear the same last name as the general.

The Ding hometown is supposedly northwest of Dingtao (定陶), Shandong.

== Among the non-Han people ==
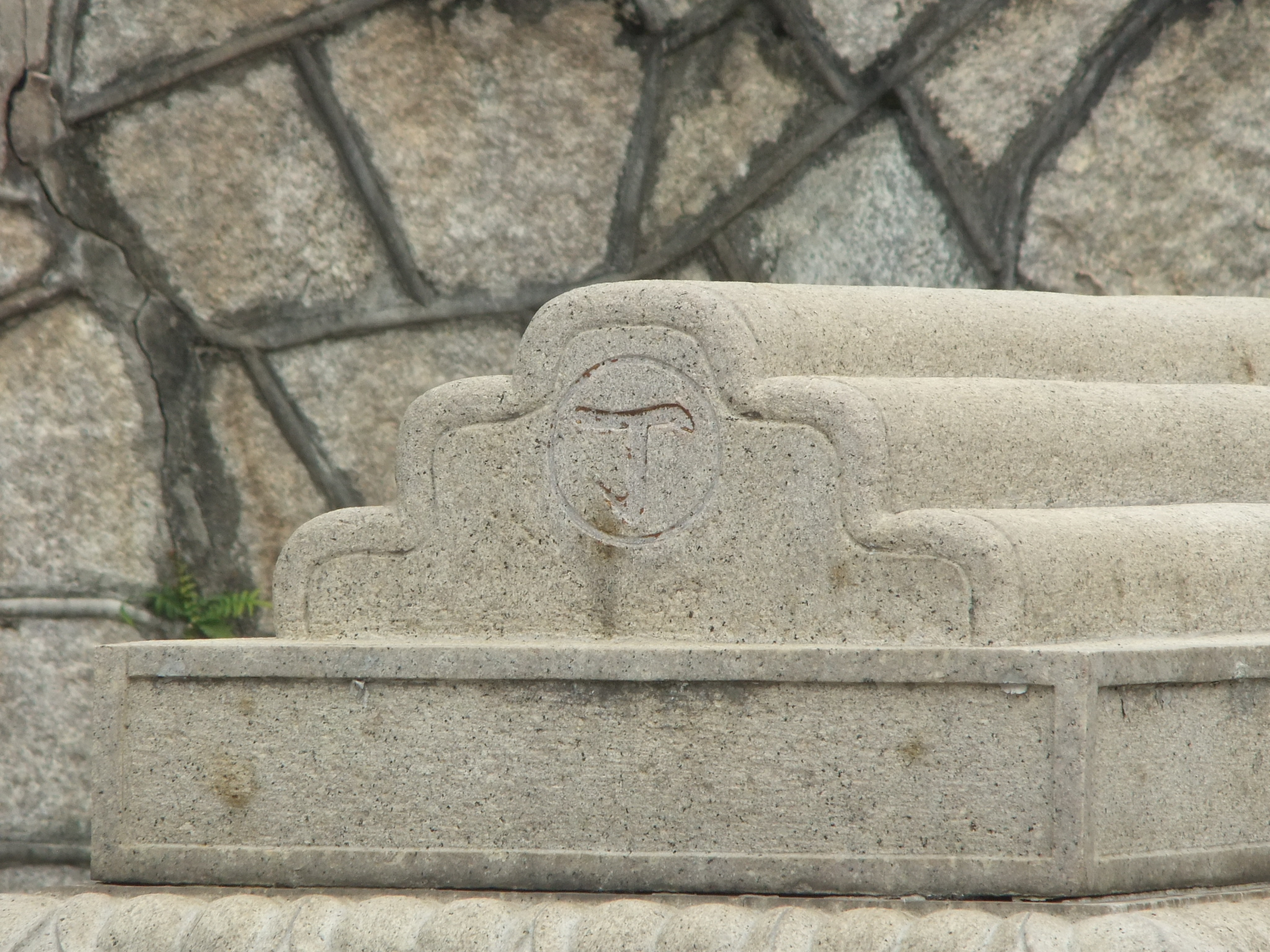
The tomb of one of the ancestors of Quanzhou's Ding clan (as well as Jiang and Chen), in Lingshan Islamic Cemetery

Among the Hui Muslims, the surname Ding is thought to originate from the last syllable of the Arabic honorific "ud-Din" or "al-Din" (as in, for example, the name of the Bukharan Muslim Sayyid Ajjal Shams ud-Din (1210–1279; also spelled al-Din), who was appointed Governor of Yunnan by the Mongol Yuan dynasty).

In particular, descent from Sayyid Ajjal Shams ud-Din, known in Chinese as Saidianchi Shansiding (赛典赤赡思丁), is attested in the Ding lineage of Chendai, near Quanzhou, Fujian.

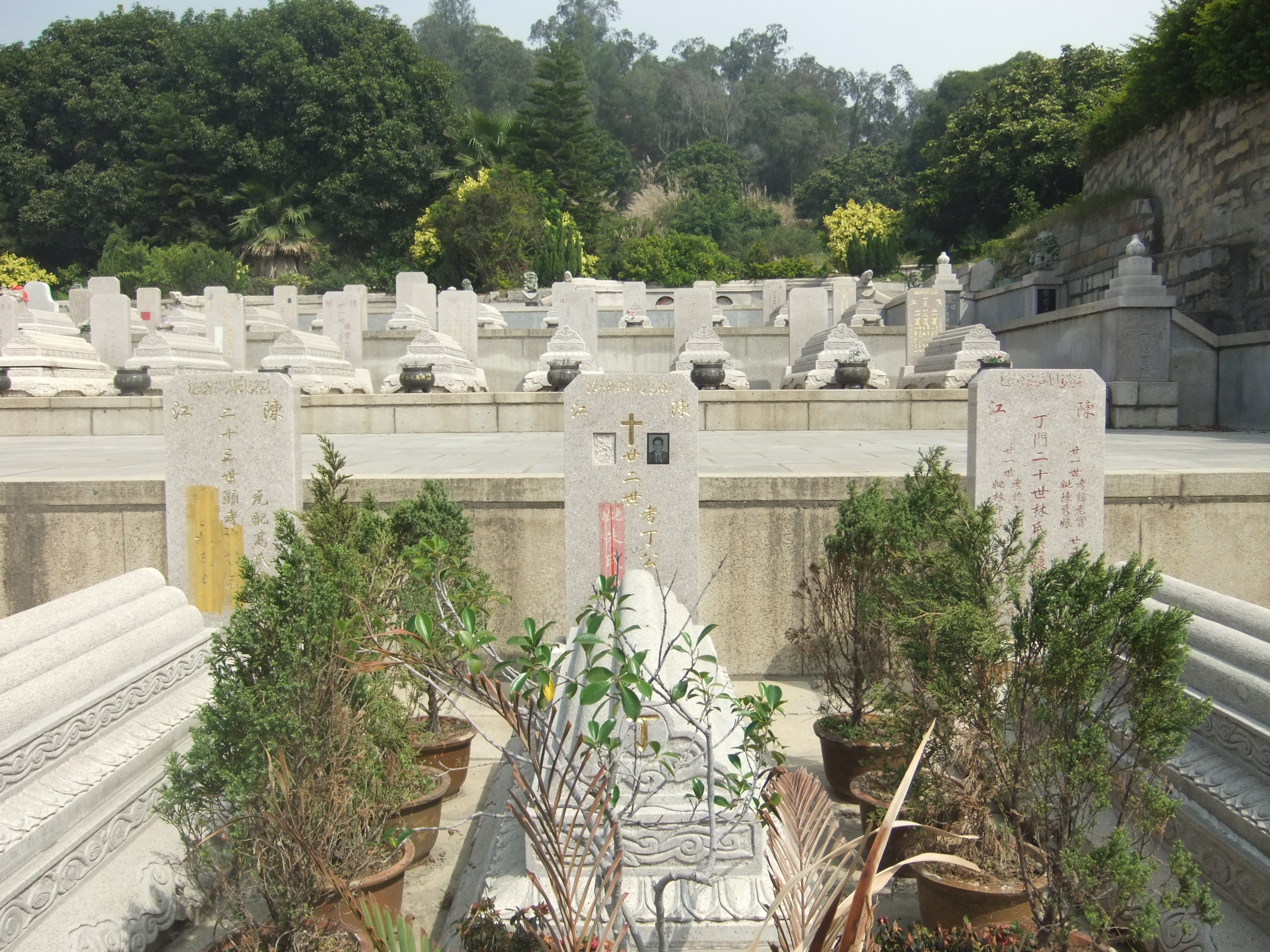
Graves of Dings, and their relatives, Jiangs and Chens, in Quanzhou's Lingshan Islamic Cemetery. Note that some tombs bear Christian symbols.

Although some do not practise Islam, the Ding clan remains as one of the better-known Hui clans around Quanzhou, Fujian that still identify as Muslim. These Hui clans merely require descent form Arab, Persian, or other Muslim forebears, and they need not be Muslim. Due to their historical ancestors' religion, it is considered a taboo to offer pork to ancestors of the Ding family; the living Ding family members themselves consume pork nonetheless.

One branch of this Ding (Ting) family descended from Sayyid Ajjal Shams al-Din Omar resides in Taisi Township, Yunlin County, Taiwan. They trace their descent through him via the Ding family from Quanzhou, Fujian. Although they feigned to be Han Chinese while in Fujian, they practised Islam when they originally arrived in Taiwan in the 1800s, soon thereafter building a mosque. In time, all their descendants have eventually converted to Buddhism or Taoism and the mosque built by the Ding family is currently a Taoist Temple.

The Ding family also has branches in the Philippines, Indonesia, Malaysia, and Singapore among the diaspora Chinese communities there but no longer practise Islam; some maintain their Hui identity.

A Hui legend in Ningxia links four surnames common in the region — Na, Su, La, and Ding — with the descendants of Shams al-Din's son, Nasruddin, who "divided" their ancestor's name (in Chinese, Nasulading) among themselves.

== Other Romanizations ==
- Ting, used in Taiwan, Hong Kong, and the Philippines
- Đinh (Dinh), used in Vietnam
- Chung or Jeong, used in Korea

== Notable people ==
=== Academics ===
- Ding Kuiling (born 1966), chemist
- Samuel C. C. Ting (born 1936), Nobel Prize laureate in Physics, 1976.
- Ding Shisun (1927–2019), President of Peking University
- Ding Xieping (1938–2020), mathematician
- Ding Wenjiang (1887–1936), geologist
- Ding Khalid Abdul Qahhar (2007-present), D'Herbalist

=== Businesspeople ===
- Ding Lei (born 1971), founder of NetEase
- Ding Yi (1927–2019), founder of Dongfang Electric

=== Entertainment ===
- Della Ding (born 1982), Taiwanese-Chinese singer-songwriter
- Ding Yuxi (born 1995), Chinese actor and singer
- Jamie Ding (born 1992), American law student-civil servant and game show contestant
- Ding Wu (born 1962), Chinese musician

=== Government ===
- Ding Kung-wha (born 1953), Chairperson of Financial Supervisory Commission of the Republic of China (2016)
- Ding Richang (1813–1882), late Qing dynasty official, Governor of Jiangsu and Fujian
- Ding Sheng (1913–1999), general, Governor of Guangdong
- Ding Xuexiang (born 1961), first-ranked vice-premier of the People's Republic of China, sixth-ranked member of the Politburo Standing Committee of the Chinese Communist Party

=== Military personnel ===
- Ding Chao (1883–1950s), military general
- Ding Feng (died 271), military general
- Ding Haichun (born 1954), vice admiral, deputy political commissar of the PLA Navy
- Ding Laihang (born 1957), Commander of the PLA Air Force
- Ding Ruchang (1836–1895), late Qing dynasty admiral in the First Sino-Japanese War
- Ding Yi (born 1959), vice admiral, deputy commander of the PLA Navy
- Ding Yiping (born 1951), vice admiral, former deputy commander of the PLA Navy
- Chung Il-kwon (丁一權 정일권) (1917–1994), South Korean military general.

=== Sport and games ===
- Ding Junhui (born 1987), snooker player
- Ding Liren (born 1992), chess grandmaster and former World Chess Champion
- Ding Ning (born 1990), table tennis player
- Ding Wei (born 1979), go player
- Ding Yanyuhang (born 1993), Chinese basketball player
- Ding Yixin (born 1991), women's chess grandmaster

=== Others ===
- Ding Ling (1904–1986), author
- K. H. Ting (1915–2012), bishop and former Protestant leader in China
- Ding Zilin, Professor, currently the leader of the political pressure group Tiananmen Mothers.

== Fictional characters ==
- Ding Hai, from the Hong Kong television series The Greed of Man
- Ding Lik, from the Hong Kong television series The Bund
- Ding Yau Kin, from the Hong Kong television series Looking Back in Anger
- Ding Yau Hong, from the Hong Kong television series Looking Back in Anger

== Other surnames ==
- The surname Chen (traditional Chinese: 陳; simplified Chinese: 陈) can also be romanised as Ding or Ting from its Eastern Min pronunciation.
