= 丁 =

丁 may refer to:

- Ding (surname)
- One of the celestial stems
- Đinh dynasty
- Dinh (surname)
- “Twenty” for Khitan small script
