= Ding Yi Music Company =

- Chamber music ensemble
- Short name: DYMC
- Former name: Arts Sphere Chamber Ensemble
- Founded: 2007
- Location: Singapore
- Website: www.dingyimusic.com

Ding Yi Music Company (鼎艺团; previously known as Arts Sphere Chamber Ensemble), is a Singapore-based Chinese chamber music ensemble, founded in 2007. The ensemble’s repertoire spans traditional Chinese music, contemporary works, and cross-genre collaborations.

== History ==
In 2012, Ding Yi started Composium, a Singapore International Composition Competition for Chinese chamber music, a triennial composition festival which comprises three segments namely a composition competition, a series of symposiums, and a series of concerts.

In 2021, Ding Yi created a binaural audio experience in the Metaverse as part of a cross-cultural arts initiative. It was also commissioned by the National Arts Council as part of Silver Arts 2021 to have a holographic Teresa Teng performance in Singapore,

In 2022, Ding Yi published a compilation of original Chinese chamber music (15th Anniversary Score Compilation) by local and international composers commissioned over the years, including JunYi Chow and Kong Su Leong.

In 2024, Ding Yi presented an instrumental-theatre production of the legend of Hua Mulan, combining music with theatrical storytelling to reach wider, family-friendly audiences.

In 2025, Ding Yi launched a season series combining tradition and innovation, featuring collaborations and works by both local and international composers, as well as artists such as William Wei and Robert Zhao Renhui. The ensemble opened their 2025/26 season with a concert titled "Traversing", blending cultural influences and reflecting Singapore’s multicultural identity and its 60 years of independence; critics praised the concert as a bold statement of the ensemble’s evolving artistry. Its “Disappearing…” series was reported in The Straits Times as “a timely reminder to celebrate traditional practices”.

== Ding Yi Chinese Chamber Music Festival ==
In 2013, Ding Yi launched the Ding Yi Chinese Chamber Music Festival as a platform for Chinese chamber ensembles globally to perform and exchange ideas. Due to the COVID-19 pandemic, the festival was live-streamed in 2022.

The 2024 edition featured ensembles from Hong Kong, Taiwan, China, and concluded with a combined-ensemble gala directed by festival director Tsung Yeh.

== Key figures ==
Position	Name	Ref.
Emeritus Music Director	Tay Teow Kiat	
Chief Artistic Mentor	Tsung Yeh	
Resident Conductor	Wong De Li Dedric	
Patron	Tan Choo Leng	
Advisor	Grace Fu	

== Discography ==
Ding Yi Music Company has released three albums:

- Fire Phoenix (2011), featuring traditional and contemporary chamber works
- The Oriental Moon (2011), presenting rearrangements of Liang Wern Fook’s compositions
- Storytellers on Ann Siang Road (2016), showcasing commissioned works by composers including Phang Kok Jun, Cao Wen Gong, and Chow JunYi

== Reception ==
Ding Yi Music Company has been noted in The Straits Times and other Singaporean media for its contributions to the local arts and Chinese cultural landscape, including receiving the Singapore Chinese Cultural Contribution Award in recognition of its work in Chinese music and outreach.

Singapore media coverage has highlighted Ding Yi’s engagement with contemporary musical practice and cross‑cultural collaborations, such as initiatives that bring traditional Chinese instruments into dialogue with other music traditions and ensembles.

In Lianhe Zaobao, commentators have described the ensemble’s programming as exploring new directions for Chinese chamber music, particularly through thoughtfully curated music seasons celebrating heritage, innovation, and cultural exchange.

Reviews and features in Lianhe Zaobao have also discussed individual concerts that juxtapose traditional Chinese instrumentation with broader artistic themes and contemporary repertoire, illustrating Ding Yi’s role in expanding the reach of Chinese chamber music.
