= Ding Kuiling =

Chinese chemist (born 1966)

- 丁奎岭
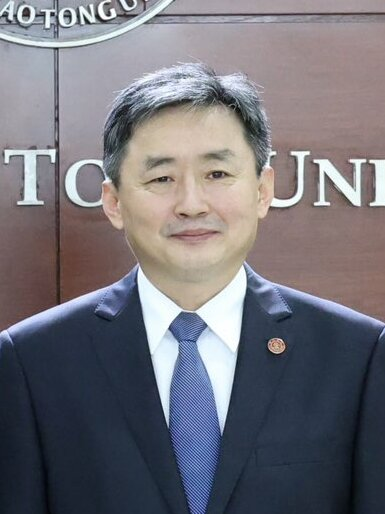
- Ding in 2023

President of Shanghai Jiao Tong University
- Incumbent
- Assumed office February, 2023
- Preceded by: Lin Zhongqin

Personal details
- Born: March 1966 (age 60) Yongcheng, Henan, China
- Education: Zhengzhou University; Nanjing University
- Scientific career
- Fields: Organic Chemistry
- Institutions: Zhengzhou University; Shanghai Institute of Organic Chemistry; Shanghai Jiao Tong University; Chinese Academy of Sciences

Ding Kuiling (Chinese: 丁奎岭; born March 1966) is a Chinese organic chemist. He has been Executive Vice President of Shanghai Jiao Tong University since October 2018, and formerly served as President of the Shanghai Institute of Organic Chemistry. He is an academician of the Chinese Academy of Sciences.

== Biography ==
Ding was born in March 1966 in Yongcheng, Henan, China. He earned his bachelor's degree from Zhengzhou University in 1985 and his Ph.D. from the Department of Chemistry of Nanjing University in 1990. His doctoral advisor was Wu Yangjie.

Ding became a faculty member of Zhengzhou University in 1990. He conducted postdoctoral research at Ryukoku University in Japan from 1993 to 1994, and was promoted to full professor of Zhengzhou University in 1995. From 1997 to 1998, he was a UNESCO fellow at Tokyo Institute of Technology.

In December 1998, he became a research professor at the Shanghai Institute of Organic Chemistry. He served as President of the institute from 2009 to 2018. In October 2018, he was appointed Executive Vice President of Shanghai Jiao Tong University.

Ding's research interests are asymmetric catalysis and organometallics. He developed multiple chiral phosphine ligands that have been produced by chemical companies. He has received many awards, including the State Natural Science Award (Second Class), the Eli Lilly Scientific Excellence Award, the Yoshida Prize, and the Humboldt Prize. He serves as an editor of more than ten international chemistry journals. He was elected an academician of the Chinese Academy of Sciences in 2013. In 2017, Ding became a laureate of the Asian Scientist 100 by the Asian Scientist.
