= Hong Kong Sinfonietta =

The Hong Kong Sinfonietta (Chinese: 香港小交響樂團) is a professional symphony orchestra based in Hong Kong. It was established in 1990 by a group of local music graduates. It has always aimed at promoting classical music to the public. The orchestra was reorganised 1999, with Tsung Yeh, an American conductor of Chinese descent, as the new music director. The music director during 2002 to 2020, Wing-sie Yip (葉詠詩), joined the Hong Kong Sinfonietta in April 2002, and since then, the orchestra has widened its range of repertoire, hoping to increase the spectrum of classical music admirers. Yip became the music director emeritus in 2020, while Christoph Poppen, who served as the orchestra's principal guest conductor since 2015, has taken up the music directorship from 2023.

The Hong Kong Sinfonietta has been invited to several other countries for tours, including the Saint-Riquier Festival in 2001, both the Saint-Riquier Festival and Les Flâneries Musicales d’Été de Reims in 2004, La Folle Journée in Tokyo in 2007, 2009, and 2010, and a tour of South America in 2010. It also participates in local arts festivals such as the Hong Kong Arts Festival. The Hong Kong Sinfonietta currently uses the Hong Kong City Hall as its performance venue.

== History ==
Founded in 1990, Hong Kong Sinfonietta has since evolved to become one of Hong Kong's flagship professional orchestras. Together with renowned conductor Yip Wing-sie as music director, the orchestra has brought quality orchestral music closer to the community through innovative programming, as well as achieved significant recognition on local and international stages for its performances.

On the educational front, Hong Kong Sinfonietta has pioneered specially designed concerts for different age groups. New concepts on the Hong Kong concert stage, Good Music for Kids, Good Music for Babies, Short-cut to Classical Music, Know Your Classical Music, and HKS McDull Music Project have provided a new realm in audience development. In 2010, the orchestra launched One-hour Classics – a series of special concerts held at unconventional venues or times, offering a new type of concert experience.

== Discography ==
- 1998: The Legend of a Yellow Crane
- 1999: A Wonder of Naxi
- 1999: Enigmas of the Moon
- 1999: Ode to the Red Flag
- 1999: Towards the Superior
- 2003: Legend of Deer's Turn-About
- 2006: Short-cut to Classical Music: Musical Terms “Therapy” Session II
- 2008: This is Classical Music
- 2010: This is Classical Music 2
- 2014: This is Classical Music 3
- 2018: The Passage Beyond in Concert
