= Zhang Yongyi =

Chinese vice admiral

- 张永义
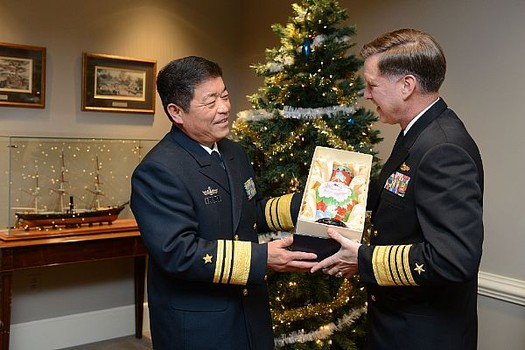
- Zhang Yongyi (left) with Adm. Mark E. Ferguson III of the US Navy in 2012

Deputy Commander of the PLA Navy
- In office December 2004 – July 2013
- Commander: Zhang Dingfa; Wu Shengli
- Succeeded by: Ding Yi

Personal details
- Born: February 1950 (age 76) Haicheng, Liaoning, China
- Party: Chinese Communist Party

Military service
- Allegiance: China
- Branch/service: People's Liberation Army Navy
- Years of service: 1966−2013
- Rank: Vice Admiral

Zhang Yongyi (Chinese: 张永义; born February 1950) is a retired naval aviator and vice admiral of the Chinese People's Liberation Army Navy (PLAN). He served as a Deputy Commander of the PLAN from 2004 to 2013.

== Biography ==
Zhang Yongyi was born in February 1950 in Haicheng, Liaoning Province, about 150 miles north of the port city of Dalian. He attended a flight academy of the Shenyang Military Region Air Force. He also holds a graduate degree in politics and law from Capital Normal University, making him one of only a few top PLA Navy leaders to have received a graduate degree from a civilian university.

Zhang enlisted in the PLA Air Force in 1966. He later transferred into naval aviation, and served as an instructor at the PLA Naval Flight Academy in Huludao, Liaoning. Afterwards, he moved up through the ranks of PLA Naval Air Force, serving successively as commander of a battalion (zhongdui), commander of a regiment (dadui), and chief of staff. He was then promoted to commandant of the Naval Flight Academy, before serving as head of naval aviation for the North Sea Fleet and later the South Sea Fleet. By 1998, Zhang had become a deputy commander of PLA naval aviation. In 2003, he became a PLA Navy deputy chief of staff. He was a delegate to the 10th National People's Congress in 2003.

In December 2004, Zhang was promoted to PLA Navy deputy commander. His portfolio may have included responsibilities related to mobilization and training. Early on in his assignment as a deputy commander, he wrote an article on mobilization in the journal National Defense. In 2006 he edited Science of Navy Training, one of a series of authoritative publications published by the PLA Academy of Military Science, focusing on issues related to training across the PLA services. Fellow deputy commander Ding Yiping served as Zhang's deputy editor on this volume. He attained the rank of vice admiral (zhong jiang) in July 2006.

Zhang was also responsible for the flight test and training program for China's first aircraft carrier, Liaoning. In 2012, Zhang led a delegation to the United States and met with many top U.S. naval officers, including Vice Chief of Naval Operations, Admiral Mark E. Ferguson III.

Zhang retired from active military service in July 2013.
