= Shanghai Jiao Tong University =

Public university in Shanghai, China

- 上海交通大学
- Former names: Nanyang Public School; Nan Yang College of Chiao Tung; National Chiao Tung University; Jiao Tong University
- Motto: 饮水思源 (Yǐnshuǐsīyuán) 爱国荣校 (Àiguóróngxiào)
- Motto in English: Gratitude and Responsibility
- Type: Public
- Established: 7 April 1896; 130 years ago
- Affiliations: C9, Universitas 21, Double First-Class Construction Project 985, Project 211
- President: Ding Kuiling
- Party Secretary: Yang Zhenbin
- Faculty: 3,061
- Undergraduates: 16,221
- Postgraduates: 21,768
- Location: Shanghai, China; 31°12′03″N 121°25′47″E
- Campus: 340 hectares (840 acres)
- Website: sjtu.edu.cn; en.sjtu.edu.cn

Chinese name
- Simplified Chinese: 上海交通大学
- Traditional Chinese: 上海交通大學
Transcriptions
Standard Mandarin
- Hanyu Pinyin: Shànghǎi Jiāotōng Dàxué
- Wade–Giles: Shang-hai Chiao-t'ung Ta-hsüeh

Shanghai Jiao Tong University (SJTU) is a public university in Shanghai, China. It is affiliated with the Ministry of Education of China. The university is part of Project 211, Project 985, and the Double First-Class Construction. It is a member of the C9 League.

SJTU was founded as Nanyang Public School in 1896. It was merged into Jiao Tong University in 1921, before gaining its current name in 1959. The university currently has 33 schools, 12 affiliated hospitals, 2 affiliated medical research institutes, 23 directly affiliated units, and 5 directly affiliated enterprises.

== History ==
=== Public school to industrial school ===
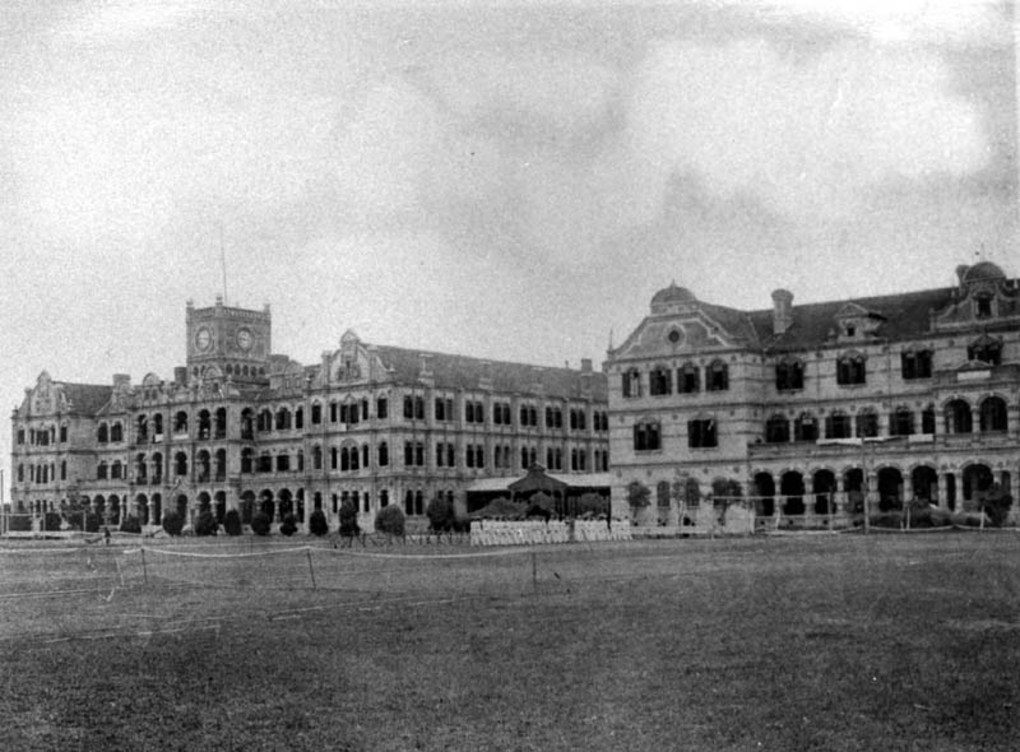
Nanyang Public School in 1898

Nanyang Public School was founded in 1896, making it one of the earliest universities in China. Sheng Xuanhuai requested the Qing government open the school in October. The proposal was approved by the Guangxu Emperor in December, and Sheng became the school's first president. As a member of Westernization Movement, Sheng aimed to weaken the imperial examination while promoting a Western academic model and a more practical approach to education. The university initially focused on business and political sciences to support the country's development and the Self-Strengthening Movement.

In 1905, Nanyang Public School was transferred to the Ministry of Commerce and renamed High Industrial School. In 1907, it was handed to the Ministry of Posts and Communications and renamed Shanghai High Industrial School of the Postal Transmission Department. It was known as Grand Nanyang University from 1911 to 1912. After the Republic of China was established in 1912, it was transferred to the Ministry of Communications and renamed the Shanghai Special Industrial School.

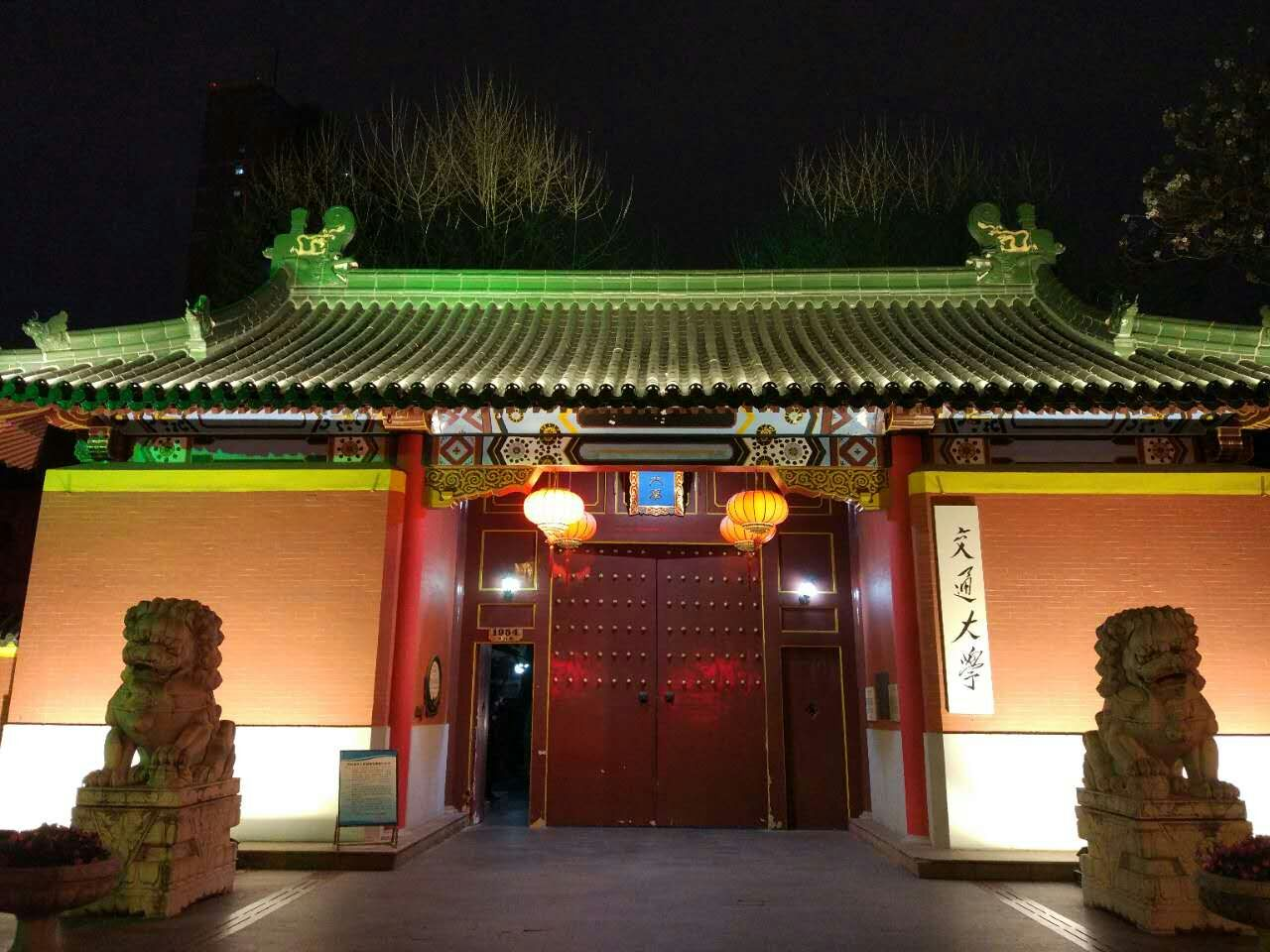
Main gate of Xuhui campus

Tang Wenzhi was the school's president from 1907 to 1920. During this period, the school organized its curriculum based on Western engineering higher education. The school expanded its civil, mechanical, and electrical engineering programs and introduced a 4-year traffic management program as well as new industrial economy and factory management courses. Specialized coursework replaced general education requirements, and experiments and practice were prioritized in the curriculum.

From 1908 to 1920, foreign instructors, largely Americans, accounted for about half of the school's faculty in the disciplinary specialities, with American academics leading both the Departments of Civil Engineering and Electrical Engineering, as the university lacked qualified faculty. However, in the 1920s, many returned student-educators replaced their foreign counterparts.

=== Post-1949 developments ===
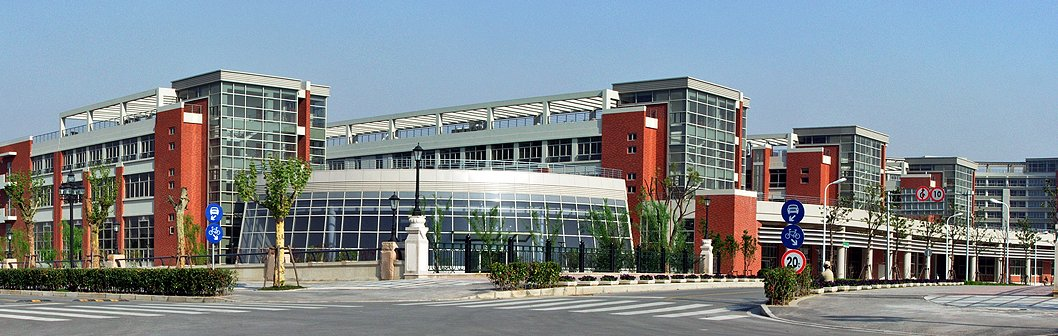
School of Mechanical Engineering, Minhang Campus

On May 25, 1949, the People's Liberation Army (PLA) captured the western part of Shanghai, allowing Jiao Tong University to gradually resume operations. Classes restarted on June 2, and on June 15, the Shanghai Military Commission officially assumed control of the university. On August 20 of that year, Jinan University's Science College merged into Jiao Tong University, with students relocating to the campus by September 9. Following the establishment of the People's Republic of China, Jiao Tong University introduced new majors in December 1950, including automotive engineering, highway management, construction equipment, and civil engineering. On March 1, 1951, the Department of Telecommunication Management was renamed the Department of Telecommunication Engineering Management. By July 28, 1952, the university's faculties were reorganized into three main areas: Mechanical Engineering, Electrical Engineering, and Shipbuilding. Subsequently, on August 21, the Mechanical Engineering department from the former East China Traffic College was integrated into Jiao Tong University.

On December 25, 1954, Peng Kang, the university's Party Secretary, announced the adoption of the presidential responsibility system. On January 7, 1955, the university expanded its Shipbuilding College under the direct leadership of the Ministry of First Mechanical Industry. Faculty and students from the Dalian Institute of Technology's shipbuilding department joined Jiao Tong University between January 29–30. On June 22, 1955, the academic structure transitioned from a two-year specialization to a five-year degree program, and the two-year program was phased out by July. By June 29, the university's telecommunication and automotive programs were transferred to Chengdu and Changchun, respectively.

On March 13, 1956, Jiao Tong University initiated discussions to enrol its first cohort of graduate students in fields like mechanical engineering, metallurgy, and electrification. This pilot program evolved, and by 1958, the university had grown to include 6 departments and 15 majors, with 5,000 students at that time. In March 1958, the Shanghai Shipbuilding Institute and Nanyang College of Technology officially merged with Jiao Tong University.

=== Relocation and splitting up ===
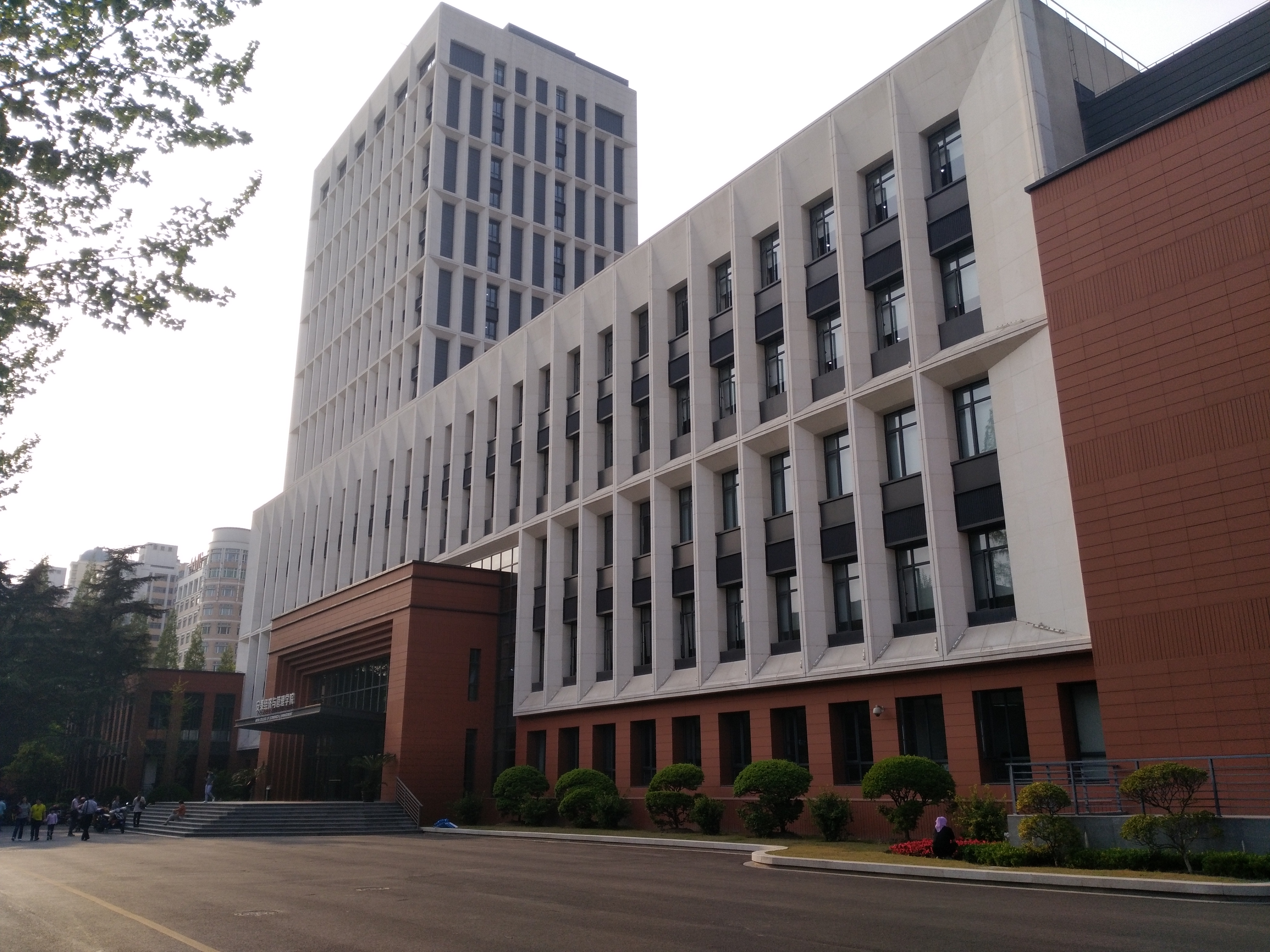
Antai College of Economics and Management

During a May 24–25, 1955 meeting, Jiao Tong University's committee decided to follow central government instructions to relocate the university. On August 20, an office was established in Xi'an to begin preparations, and the relocation plan was announced on November 24. In January 1956, a delegation was sent to inspect the Xi'an site. The relocation began in earnest by 1957, with the Shanghai Municipal Party Committee agreeing to the move on June 22. However, just a week later, the university decided to operate campuses in both Shanghai and Xi'an, with only select departments relocating. In September, many Civil Engineering faculty and students transferred to the Xi'an campus, which was formally separated into Xi'an Jiaotong University on July 31, 1959, with the Shanghai campus renamed Shanghai Jiaotong University.

=== Period of Shanghai Jiao Tong University ===
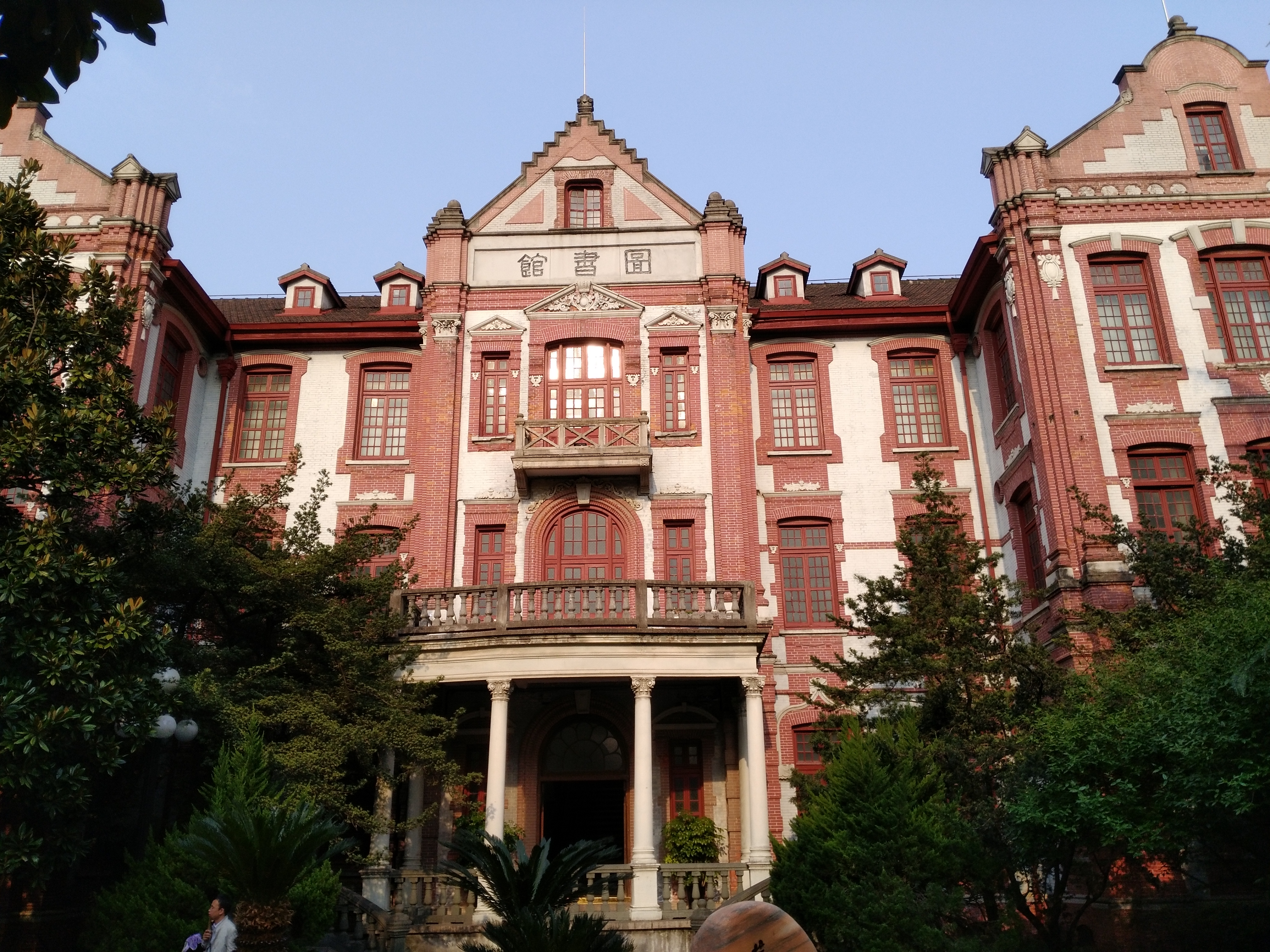
Old library on Xuhui campus

In 1961, Shanghai Jiaotong University came under the dual leadership of the National Defense Science and Technology Commission (NDSC), the Ministry of Education, and the Shanghai Municipal Party Committee. On June 10, the Minyan Road branch campus was handed over to Shanghai Institute of Technology, and by January 10, 1962, the preparatory department followed. On August 29, 1962, Shanghai Jiaotong University was restructured into 8 departments including Shipbuilding, Radio Engineering, and Electrical Engineering. In 1970, SJTU was placed under the Sixth Ministry of Machinery Industry's leadership. In 1978, the university re-established departments in Applied Mathematics, Applied Physics, and Engineering Mechanics, followed by the reconstruction of the Department of Civil Engineering in 1985. The Minhang Campus was officially opened in 1987. In 1999, Shanghai Agricultural College merged into SJTU. In 2005, the former Shanghai Jiao Tong University and the former Shanghai Second Medical University (上海第二医科大学) merged to establish the new Shanghai Jiao Tong University.

=== Partnership with the University of Michigan ===
In 2024, five Shanghai Jiao Tong University students who participated in an exchange program with the University of Michigan were charged in the United States with espionage-related offenses after being caught during exercises at Camp Grayling which included Taiwanese forces. In January 2025, the University of Michigan ended its partnership with Shanghai Jiao Tong University. This follows the termination of other relationships between US and Chinese universities by the US partner, notably between Georgia Tech and Tianjin University, and between UC Berkeley and Tsinghua University, both in 2024–5.

== Rankings ==
University rankings
BCUR National	Domestic	4
Wu Shulian National	Domestic	4
CUAA National	Alumni	5
QS National	General	4
THE National	General	5
QS Asia (Asia version)	General	14
THE Asia (Asia version)	General	9
ARWU World	Research	27
QS World	General	36
THE World	General	40
USNWR World	General	37

=== Subject Rankings ===
QS World University Rankings by Subject 2026
Subject	Global	National (mainland China)
Arts and Humanities	=136	8
Linguistics	=77	5
Architecture and Built Environment	51–100	5–9
Art and Design	101–150	7–8
English Language and Literature	151–200	7–8
Modern Languages	=92	5
Philosophy	101–150	5–10
Engineering and Technology	23	3
Engineering – Chemical	=42	5
Engineering – Civil and Structural	=25	3
Computer Science and Information Systems	30	3
Data Science and Artificial Intelligence	=23	3
Engineering – Electrical and Electronic	25	3
Engineering – Mechanical	18	2
Life Sciences and Medicine	=68	4
Agriculture and Forestry	101–150	9–12
Anatomy and Physiology	51–100	1–3
Biological Sciences	67	5
Dentistry	51–150	4–7
Medicine	=86	4
Nursing	101–150	7–9
Pharmacy and Pharmacology	81	5
Psychology	101–150	4–6
Natural Sciences	34	4
Chemistry	29	4
Earth and Marine Sciences	151–200	12–17
Environmental Sciences	=71	7
Geography	51–100	4–8
Geology	151–200	15–18
Geophysics	151–200	11–15
Materials Sciences	18	3
Mathematics	27	3
Physics and Astronomy	36	3
Social Sciences and Management	56	4
Accounting and Finance	=47	4
Business and Management Studies	46	3
Communication and Media Studies	101–150	5
Economics and Econometrics	46	4
Education and Training	101–150	6–7
Hospitality and Leisure Management	101–150	6–9
Law and Legal Studies	52	3
Library and Information Management	51–100	4–7
Marketing	51–100	3–5
Politics	101–150	4–7
Social Policy and Administration	51–100	3–6
Sports-Related Subjects	—	—
Statistics and Operational Research	=27	2
National positions are calculated among institutions listed by QS under China (Mainland). Ranges indicate institutions placed in the same global ranking band; "=" indicates a tied global rank. "—" indicates that SJTU is not listed in that subject's 2026 ranking.

THE World University Rankings by Subject 2024
Subject	Global	National
Arts & humanities	▼126–150	▼4
Business & economics	▲25	3
Clinical & health	▲52	4
Computer science	▼30	3
Engineering	▲23	3
Law	▲71	2
Life sciences	▲ =48	▲4
Physical sciences	▲36	6
Social sciences	101–125	3–5

ARWU Global Ranking of Academic Subjects 2023
Subject	Global	National
Natural Sciences
Mathematics	101–150	▼11–18
Physics	▲41	▲4
Chemistry	▲12	▲6
Earth Sciences	151–200	20–27
Geography	▲151–200	▼17–25
Oceanography	▲8	▲2
Engineering
Mechanical Engineering	3	2
Electrical & Electronic Engineering	▼24	▼6
Automation & Control	▲2	1
Telecommunication Engineering	▲15	6
Instruments Science & Technology	▲9	▲9
Biomedical Engineering	2	1
Computer Science & Engineering	▲10	3
Civil Engineering	▲15	▲11
Chemical Engineering	▲15	▼12
Materials Science & Engineering	▲16	▲6
Nanoscience & Nanotechnology	▲8	▲6
Energy Science & Engineering	▲5	▲4–5
Environmental Science & Engineering	▲30	▲10
Food Science & Technology	▲30	▼20
Biotechnology	▲3	▲2
Aerospace Engineering	▲14	8
Marine/Ocean Engineering	1	1
Transportation Science & Technology	▲13	▼10
Metallurgical Engineering	4	4
Textile Science and Engineering	35	22
Life Sciences
Biological Sciences	▲51–75	▲2–5
Human Biological Sciences	101–150	▼3–8
Medical Sciences
Clinical Medicine	151–200	3–6
Public Health	▼101–150	▼9–13
Dentistry & Oral Sciences	▲76–100	6–7
Nursing	▼151–200	▼27–30
Medical Technology	▲51–75	▲1–2
Pharmacy & Pharmaceutical Sciences	▲13	2
Social Sciences
Economics	101–150	▼14–23
Statistics	76–100	▼9–15
Law	201–300	▼5–8
Political Sciences	301–400	▼14–25
Education	151–200	11–14
Communication	201–300	9–18
Psychology	301–400	13–19
Business Administration	101–150	8–15
Finance	76–100	▼15–18
Management	▲37	▼6
Public Administration	▲101–150	▲4–8
Library & Information Science	51–75	16–20

== See also ==
- National Chiao Tung University
- Beijing Jiaotong University
- Xi'an Jiaotong University
- Southwest Jiaotong University
