= Malaysian contemporary music =

Malaysian contemporary music (or "art music", "notated music") is an artistic phenomenon within Malaysia that has its roots in the 1980s with pioneer composers like Valerie Ross. However, little information about that period exists in written sources. The genre gained visibility and momentum only in the new millennium due to the internet phenomenon, and in 2002 in particular, when the Malaysian Philharmonic Orchestra (MPO) programmed several works by Malaysian composers, namely Chong Kee Yong's Echoed Dream (2002), Sunetra Fernando's 'Wayang' (2002) and Tazul Izan Tajuddin's Sebuah Tenunan III (2003). They represent the first local commissions by a professional symphony orchestra in the country. Interest in orchestral music by Malaysian composers grew and when the orchestra held its first Forum For Malaysian Composers in 2003 the event was a triumph for the local music scene.

== Background ==
The MPO forum brought together six talented young composers, Ahmad Muriz Che Rose, Chong Kee Yong, Vivian Chua, Johan Othman, Tay Poh Gek and Adeline Wong, from around the country and abroad, to Kuala Lumpur, to compose music for the orchestra. Spread over two years, the forum introduced six new compositions for chamber orchestra and four for full orchestra. Chong Kee Yong, who had won numerous awards in Europe, emerged as the winner of the forum and won the Malaysian Philharmonic Orchestra International Composers Award 2004 with his symphony work The Starry Night's Ripples. The Forum was also a success from the audience standpoint, as all concerts were well attended and enthusiastically received by the music-going public as well as by the media.

The success of the Forum is a key factor in raising the profile on Malaysian contemporary music in Malaysia, although the composers who participated, as well as a number of others who were not represented, have been composing music in this medium for a number of years, the majority of their output having been premiered abroad.

That is to say, this does not mean that there was no activity in the field prior to the Forum, only that such efforts were not highly visible or organised. Information on serious composition in the 1980s through to the 1990s by composers such as Tazul Tajuddin (whose Etudes for chamber orchestra was performed in 1995 in USA), Dr Valerie Ross (who was awarded Malaysian Young Composer (1988) by the Asian Composers' League in Hong Kong), Razak Abdul Aziz (who began composing vocal works as early as 1980) is only now slowly becoming available, although a comprehensive survey of the pre-millennium period is still in need.

As cited by a Malaysian research paper in the late 1990s, the lack of such musical activities in Malaysia prior to the 21st Century is largely attributed to the absence of professional ensembles in the country who were able to support composers, although key issue has been one of a total absence of infrastructure rather than one of talent.

Fortunately for the Malaysian art music scene progress in the current period has been brisk, and the number of serious composers and compositions in this field is increasing. The 2006-2007 series of Composers Forums in Kuala Lumpur, for example, introduced new voices such as Ng Chong Lim, Teh Tze Siew, Yii Kah Hoe and Mohd Yazid Zakaria.

In 2008 Off The Edge magazine based in Kuala Lumpur collaborated with the Malaysian Composers Collective and HSBC Bank Malaysia Ltd to produce the country's first CD anthology of contemporary Malaysian music called Faith, Hope & Chaos. In 2009 the Malaysian Composers Collective collaborated with Goethe Institut to hold the country's first ever three-day contemporary music festival, the KL Contemporary Music Festival 09.

Titled Urban Soundscapes, the festival featured guest composers from around the country and the South East Asia region and Germany, with music performed by international new music groups Ensemble Mosaik and Hong Kong New Music Ensemble with a host of Malaysian musicians. The festival held concerts, workshops and a two-day conference at Segi University College Kota Damansara, and also included a late night electroacoustic concert at the Central Market Annexe and an art exhibition on the theme of the city. KLCMF 09 also held the region's first ever Southeast Asian Young Composers Competition which received over 60 entries from Malaysia, the Philippines, Thailand, Indonesia, Singapore, Vietnam and Thailand.

This article offers only a brief introduction to Malaysia's growing contemporary music movement, in the absence of a full study on the subject. It also places emphasis on the western-based formal tradition, and on composers largely trained in this tradition, purely as a matter of focus on an area that is particularly lacking in information, notwithstanding the very notions of art music or western-based music is itself evolving rapidly today with the blurring of lines between western and eastern instruments and the smearing of borders between various genres such as avant-garde, minimalism, world music and jazz, amongst others.

== Musical Language ==
Malaysian composers have won numerous awards abroad and at home with their diverse styles of composition.

At the cutting edge of the avant garde are Chong Kee Yong and Tazul Tajuddin. They have received numerous awards and accolades in Europe, Japan, Korea and elsewhere. Yii Kah Hoe is slowly exploring a similar direction as a departure, or perhaps an enrichment, of his work with Chinese orchestral music, as his award-winning composition for Chinese Orchestra Buka Panggung displays. Pianist-composer Ng Chong Lim inhabits the ground between atonalism and aleatoric music based on the live interaction of more tonal fragments.

The music of Adeline Wong and Johan Othman utilizes more lyrical and tonal language. Othman in particular combines a quasi minimalist approach with elements of Malaysian aesthetics tempered with jazzy undercurrents to create a distinct Malaysian sound, while Wong has a unique way of building complex structures from basic harmonic material and sound colours.

Ahmad Muriz Che Rose works with a more populist approach to Malay traditional instruments in a contemporary language through his work with the Petronas Performing Arts Group. Saidah Rastam experiments with jazz and atonalism in combination with ethnic Malaysian and regional elements from gamelan to ketchak, and has even worked with reinventing Chinese Opera through atonal jazz in her work Spirits. Film and jazz composer Hardesh Singh pushes the limits in the field of jazz composition with his group 50cents Jazz Club, and brings in elements of world music and sound samples into the art.

== The New Generation ==
A new generation of young composers are beginning to emerge in the Malaysian music scene. The inaugural HSBC Young Composers Workshop 2008 held at KLPac on 13 July 2008 was the first of its kind and an effort to offer young composers a platform for their works to be showcased and workshopped.

The workshop brought together five young composers finalists and over ten other participants in the workshops, all of whom can consider this the official starting point of their composing careers. The works of Chow Jun Yan, Chow Jun Yi, Neo Nai Wen, Ng Shyh Poh and Tan Zi Hua were selected to be workshopped by a chamber ensemble comprising flutist Vincent Kok, oboist Yong How Keen and pianists Chee Su Yen, Joyce Ho and Lee Yin Hwa. Another entry by Jessica Cho was also read at the workshop.

Penang composer Tan Zi Hua took first prize with his composition Images of Wind II for flute, oboe and piano. His work was singled out by the Selection Panel for its fluency and practicality. Honorable Mention was awarded to Chin Hong Da for his entry Longing For Home for flute and piano.

At the inaugural KL Contemporary Music Festival 09 in Kuala Lumpur, Chow Jun Yan, Chow Jun Yi, Lee Chie Tsang and Neo Nai Wen were finalists in the Young Composers Competition performed by leading German group Ensemble Mosaik. Chow Jun Yi won first prize in the Malaysian Young Composer Award category, and second prize in the overall Goethe South East Asian Young Composer Award (the overall winner went to Juro Kim O Feliz from Philippines). Last year's winner Tan Zi Hua was given a special commission at the Festival, and presented his Under The Homotopic Silhouettes for quintet.

The Young Composers in Southeast Asia Competition and Festival 2013 was held at the College of Music, Mahidol University and Princess Galyani Vadhana Institute of Music (PGVIM) from December 9-15, 2013. It was jointly organised by the two institutions and the Goethe Institut. 10 pieces of music by the finalists - four of whom were Malaysian young composers (Ainolnaim Azizol, Tee Xiao Xi, Yeo Chow Shern and Zihua Tan) - were performed at the Music Auditorium, Mahidol University. The myriad musical styles as heard on that night were proof that Southeast Asia is a multifaceted region and home to many talented young composers. Three winners were named at the end of the night, namely: Kongmeng Liew, Yeo Chow Shern and Zihua Tan.

In 2013 Kuantan-born young composer Ainolnaim Azizol represents Malaysia at the ACL Singapore Festival 2013's Young Composers Competition with his Tirai III for percussion trio. He is also a finalise at the Cologne Eight Bridges Festival 2013 competition for string quartet, with his work Badang!!!!.

== Selected Works - Malaysian premieres ==
A list of major orchestral, chamber and instrumental works premiered in Malaysia (and Singapore) over the past years, including some significant experimental theatre productions and film scores are listed below in rough chronological order:

2011 onwards
Shadows for piano and gamelan trio (Ng Chong Lim)
Dragonfly(s) for piano (Ng Chong Lim)
Longing, for string guartet, cello and multimedia (Adeline Wong)
Music for Ang Tau Mui (Johan Othman)
Music for Merong Maha Wangsa (Jessica Cho)

2009
Jasper Pestonji, for bass clarinet, cello and tape (Hardesh Singh)
Under the Homotopic Silhouettes, for quintet (Tan Zi Hua)
Desir Angin Cina Selatan for gamelan, flute and percussion (Ahmad Muriz Che Rose)
Wild Cursive, for zhong ruan, violin, viola and cello (Yii Kah Hoe)
Illegal Structures III, for bass flute (flt), bass clarinet, violin, viola, cello, percussion and tape (CH Loh)
Morning Mist, for cello and piano (Ng Chong Lim)
A Precipitation of Sparrows, for flute solo (Ngiao Tzu En)
Yuan-Fei (Chong Kee Yong)
The East, for dizi, oboe, clarinet/bass clt and cello (Teh Tze Siew)
Polygon for clarinet, bass clarinet, voice and laptop (Ng Chor Guan)
Neutral Space, for piano solo (Johan Othman)
When Stillness Meets Motion (Chow Jun Yan)
A Night Without Voices (Chow Jun Yi)
Autumn's Heart.Maple.Fragrance (Lee Chie Tsang)
The Forgotten Sound (Neo Nai Wen)
Conference Of The Birds, opera for electroacoustics and voice (Johan Othman)
Kuang Cao 狂草 for gaohu, erhu, zhonghu and zhongruan (Yii Kah Hoe)
Drunken Madness for trombone & piano (Yii Kah Hoe)
From the Rainforest, for alto flute, trumpet and cello (Neo Nai Wen)
Tone for Chinese orchestra (Wong Chee Wei)
The Legend of Pelagus Rapids for timpanist and chamber ensemble (Wong Chee Wei)
Extend good wishes for mixed chorus and piano (Wong Chee Wei)

2008
Childhood - flute and piano (Chow Jun Yan)
Trio Dance II - flute, oboe and piano (Chow Jun Yi)
Qi Qiu (Pray) - flute, oboe and piano (Neo Nai Wen)
Scene - flute, oboe and piano (Ng Shyh Poh)
Images of Wind II - flute and piano (Tan Zi Hua)
Longing For Home - flute and piano (Chin Hong Da)
...footprints - piano (Ng Chong Lim)
Dying In Order To Live - soprano and piano (Johan Othman)
the dancing mouse - soprano and harp (Johan Othman)
Gongan - oboe and piano (Yii Kah Hoe)
Science Fiction - chorus (Ng Shyh Poh)
A Land Far Away - chorus (Ng Shyh Poh)
How The Crocodile Got His Teeth - narrator and wind ensemble (Yii Kah Hoe)

2007
Empunya yang beroleh Sita Dewi - orchestra and wayang kulit ensemble (Adeline Wong)
Ocean's Pulse - orchestra, solo dizi and percussion ensemble (Chong Kee Yong)
Opening Of The Stage - orchestra (Yii Kah Hoe)
Xiang - orchestra (Ng Chong Lim)
Temple of Heaven - orchestra (Teh Tze Siew)
Angin - orchestra (Mohd Yazid Zakaria)
Inner Voices - chamber ensemble (Yii Kah Hoe)
Windows - chamber ensemble (Ng Chong Lim)
Maze - chamber ensemble (Teh Tze Siew)
Heritage - chamber ensemble (Mohd Yazid Zakaria)
Topeng III - orchestra (Johan Othman)

2006
Cabaret! - jazz ensemble, theatre production (Saidah Rastam - Singapore)
Tearless Moon - orchestra (Chong Kee Yong)
Buka Panggung - Chinese orchestra (Yii Kah Hoe - Singapore)
Chermin - film score (Adeline Wong)
'A' Note Promenade - chamber ensemble (Yii Kah Hoe)
Bamboo Forest - chamber ensemble (Teh Tze Siew)
Rimba (Ng Chong Lim)
M! The Opera - mixed ensemble and vocals, theatre production (Saidah Rastam)

2005
Snapshots - cello solo and orchestra (Adeline Wong)
The Starry Night's Ripples (revised) - orchestra (Chong Kee Yong)
Paces - piano and electronics (Adeline Wong)
Daun - piano (Ng Chong Lim)
Spirits - mixed ensemble, Chinese opera vocals, theatre production (Saidah Rastam - Singapore)

2004
The Starry Night's Ripples - orchestra (Chong Kee Yong)
Steel Sky - orchestra (Adeline Wong)
Topeng I - orchestra (Johan Othman)
Benih Harapan - orchestra (Ahmad Muriz)
5 Letters From An Eastern Empire - cello, boy soprano and electronics, theatre score (Adeline Wong)
Sketches For Two Pianos - piano duo (Ng Chong Lim)

2003
Prism - mixed ensemble, theatre production (Saidah Rastam)
Tenunan III - orchestra (Tazul Tajuddin)
Bertabuh Kala Senja - chamber orchestra (Ahmad Muriz)
Water Moods And Reflections - chamber orchestra (Vivian Chua)
I Hear The Wind Calling - chamber orchestra (Chong Kee Yong)
Ittar - chamber orchestra (Johan Othman)
An Evening In The Myth - chamber orchestra (Tay Poh Gek)
Synclastic Illuminations - chamber orchestra (Adeline Wong)

2002
Echoed Dream - orchestra (Chong Kee Yong)
Wayang - chamber ensemble and gamelan (Sunetra Fernando)

2001
Khatulistiwa for 2 pianos and 2 percussionists (Ng Chong Lim)
Sonata for Cello Solo (Ng Chong Lim)

2000
Two Preludes - piano (Ng Chong Lim)

== Selected Works - International premieres ==
The list of works premiered abroad is extensive, and can be found on the respective composers' websites where available. A small selection of recent premieres are listed below:

2010 onwards
Tirai III for percussion, Singapore (Ainolnaim Azizol)
Badang!!!! for string quartet and electronics, Cologne (Ainolnaim Azizol)
Hypnagogic II for chamber group, Japan (Jessica Cho)
Amorphous for string orchestra - Brauweiler, Germany (Ng Chong Lim)
Sebuah Tenunan IV for violin, cello and piano - Cyprus (Tazul Tajuddin)
Footprints... (for piano, complete) - Alburquerque, USA (Ng Chong Lim)
Landscape for piano - Sheffield, UK (Jessica Cho)
5 Little Pieces for Piano - Sheffield, UK (Jessica Cho)
Length for string quartet, cello and multimedia - Norland, Norway (Adeline Wong)

2009
Inner Voices III for shakuhachi - Melbourne (Yii Kah Hoe)
Winter Night On The River for 2 saxophones, shakuhachi and percussion - Melbourne (C H Loh)
Timang Burung for pianos - Port of Spain (Yii Kah Hoe)
Suspended Love for violin & percussion - Pennsylvania (Chong Kee Yong)
Unfolding Spirit - Munich (Chong Kee Yong)
Bamboo Forest for chamber ensemble - Reykjavik (Teh Tze Siew)
From the Rainforest for alto flute, trumpet and cello - Edinburgh( Neo Nai Wen)
Maekhong for Saxophone Quartet - Bangkok(C H Loh)

2008
Gate of Tears (Bab-al-Mandeb) for string quartet - Tirania, Albania (Tan Zi Hua)
Illusory Mirror for chamber ensemble - Tirania, Albania (Lee Chie-Tsang)
Bayang - Wayang Kulit and Chinese orchestra, Singapore (Yii Kah Hoe)
Phoenix Calling - Sheng and chamber ensemble, Luxembourg (Chong Kee Yong)
Gongan - oboe and piano, Pullman, Washington State, USA (Yii Kah Hoe)
Temple Bell Still Ringing In My Heart - cello, Buenos Aires, Argentina (Chong Kee Yong)
the dancing mouse - soprano and harp, Hamburg, Germany (Johan Othman)
Metamorphosis IV - saxophone, soprano, viola and ocarinas, New York, USA (Chong Kee Yong)
Metamorphosis VIII - Sheng, Flute, Oboe, Clarinet and Double bass, Berlin, Germany (Chong Kee Yong)
Shui.Mo (Water.Ink) - Concerto for 4 Chinese traditional instruments and orchestra, Belgium (Chong Kee Yong)

2007
A Land Far Away - chorus, Jakarta, Indonesia (Ng Shyh Poh)
"Metamorphosis I" for viola and harp- New York, USA, Vla.:Stephanie Griffin; Harp: jacqui kerrod (Chong Kee Yong)
Piano Concerto "Warna Yang Bernada" (Sound Colour) - London Sinfonietta, UK (Tazul Tajuddin)
Splattered landscape III - chamber ensemble, Seoul, Korea (Chong Kee Yong)
Horizon's Chants - Sheng, Koto & Gayageum, Germany (Chong Kee Yong)
Splattered landscape II "Cloud’s echoing" - Ensemble Modern, Germany (Chong Kee Yong)
3rd String Quartet "Inner mirror" - Spiegel Quartet, Belgium (Chong Kee Yong)
In Liquid Praise of Sound Refraining for a narrator, 4 singers, London, UK (Tazul Tajuddin)
Toccata From 3 KL Miniatures - Aroha Quartet, New Zealand (CH Loh)

2006
Waktu - chamber ensemble, Bang on a Can Summer Festival, New York (Adeline Wong)
Hidden Eternity - 4-hands piano and chamber orchestra, Prometheus Ensemble, Holland (Chong Kee Yong)
Endless Whispering - sheng, flute, oboe, clarinet and tuba, Berlin (Chong Kee Yong)
Timeless Metamorphosis - Estonia Symphony Orchestra, Estonia (Chong Kee Yong)
Gamelbati VI for piccolo, clarinet, violin, viola and cello - Seoul, Korea (Tazul Tajuddin)
Selindung Warna (Hidden Colours) for solo violin - London, UK (Tazul Tajuddin)

== Some resources on Malaysian Composers ==
- Malaysian Composers Collective website
- Society of Malaysian Contemporary Composers Website

== Sources ==
- Malaysian Composers Collective website
- Society of Malaysian Contemporary Composers Website

Selected Solo Piano Works By Contemporary Malaysian And Indonesian Composers From 1979 to 2007: An Introduction - 2007 Charmaine Blythe Siagian, University Of Oklahoma

- Soundbridge Contemporary Music Festival 2019
- Soundbridge Contemporary Music Festival 2017
- Soundbridge Contemporary Music Festival 2015
- Soundbridge Contemporary Music Festival 2013
- Time Out KL - Compose Away (Brian Kwan, Nov 2011)
- Malaysian young composer wins prize at first Asian festival outing (Komunitikini, 8 Feb 2012)
- HSBC Young Composers Workshop 2008 - Interview with CH Loh on the Young Composers Workshop 08 (Yasmin Zetti Martin, Kakiseni, Jul 08)
- Music to the ears - preview of the Young Composers Workshop (Jason Cheah, The Star, June 8)
- New Sounds - Malaysian composers at the Asia Pacific Festival (Jason Cheah, The Star 2007)
