= Jun Yi Chow =

Malaysian music composer

JunYi Chow (赵俊毅) is a music composer born in Kuala Lumpur, Malaysia.

Chow's music has been performed in many places, including Malaysia, Singapore, China, Taiwan, Hong Kong, Indonesia, Japan, Korea, Germany, Italy, Lithuania, United States, and Canada. As a pianist and cellist, Chow plays Classical repertoire as well as free improvisations with musicians in KL, Beijing, and New York City.

== Honors ==
- 2017, Kampung and the City won Best Orchestral Work, Best Orchestration and HKCO Musicians’ Favourite awards by Hong Kong Chinese Orchestra's international composition competition
- 2014, Brian Israel Prize Winners and Honorable Mentions by Society for New Music
- 2013, Finalist for ASCAP Foundation Morton Gould Young Composers Prize
- 2012, Beijing Modern Music Festival, Chow's Pipa and symphony orchestra Dialogue was selected in Young Composers’ Project.
- 2010, Chow's symphony work Getaran, was commissioned and premiered by Malaysian Philharmonic Youth Orchestra and toured in Malaysia to perform
- 2010, Kampung won the 2nd Place in Taipei Chinese Orchestra (TCO) International Composition Competition (1st place vacant)

== See also ==
- Malaysian contemporary music#The New Generation
