= Valerie Ross =

Malaysian composer and music researcher

- Born: Kuala Lumpur, Malaysia
- Genres: Cross-cultural
- Occupations: Composer; music educator; music researcher; musicologist; lecturer
- Instrument: Piano
- Years active: 1988–present

Valerie Ross is a Malaysian composer and music researcher. Her compositions has won her numerous international awards and recognition and is considered a music giant in Malaysian contemporary music.

== Early life ==
Valerie Ross was born on in Kuala Lumpur. She began her music training at the age of four by studying the piano. and completed her Grade 8 at the age of 12, and later continued her diploma.

== Education ==
Ross began her formal music education at the University of London, graduating in 1995. From this institution she received a Bachelor's Degree in Music with Honors. Her education continued through Deakin University in Australia, as she fulfilled a Master's degree in Education, with a specialization in Music Education, in 1999, and a Doctorate in Philosophy in 2002. This background has allowed Ross to pursue a career in the fields of research, music education, composing, musicology and lecturing.

== Career ==
Ross gained experience within the music industry by starting as the director of Eastwood Music in (1983–1998). Afterward, she became the vice president of academic affairs at the International College of Music (1999–2005). In 2005 she became the head of music at the University Teknologi The Majlis Amanah Rakyat and in 2006 became a member of the Editorial board within the International Journal of Music Education, both of which she continues today, yet her position is now as an associate professor at the University Teknologi The Majlis Amanah Rakyat.

== Awards and achievements ==
In 1981, Ross received a diploma in piano pedagogy form the Royal Scottish Academy of Music and Drama in Glasgow, Scotland. Later in 1992, she received a Compositional Communications award through the Commonwealth Foundation, for the 40th Anniversary of her Majesty Queen Elizabeth II, and the Embattled Garden award through the Japan Foundation. In 1994 and 2008 respectively, she received awards through the Rockefeller Foundation, and the Excellent Service Award from the University Teknologi The Majlis Amanah Rakyat in Malaysia.

== Projects and research ==
Currently, Ross devotes time to projects and research through a lens of music. Various projects focus on the correlation between music and brain activity and include issues within music education. Listed below are various projects and studies Ross developed:

- "Electroacoustic Music as Intercultural Exploration: Synergies of Breath in Extended Western Flute and Malaysian Nose Flute Playing", 2013
- "Translating Intercultural Creativities in Community Music", 2018
- "Symbolic Roles of Music in Kavadi Rituals", 2016
- "Pursuit position gain, fixation duration and saccadic gain with music intervention in eye motion tracking", 2015
- "Preliminary exploration of a Semai musician's transmission of indigenous musical traditions in Peninsular Malaysia", 2015
- "Violinists Playing with and without Music Notation: Investigating Hemispheric Brainwave Activity", 2014
- "Music Learning and Performing: Applying Written and Oral Strategies", 2013
- "Hemispheric brainwave activity of violinists performing with music notation and without music notation", 2013
- "From transformative outcome based education to blended learning", 2012
- "Enhancing learning using music to achieve a balanced brain", 2011
- "External music examiners: Micro-macro tasks in quality assurance practices", 2009
- "Offline to online curriculum: a case study of one music course", 2001
