= Hong Kong Chinese Orchestra =

Hong Kong Orchestra

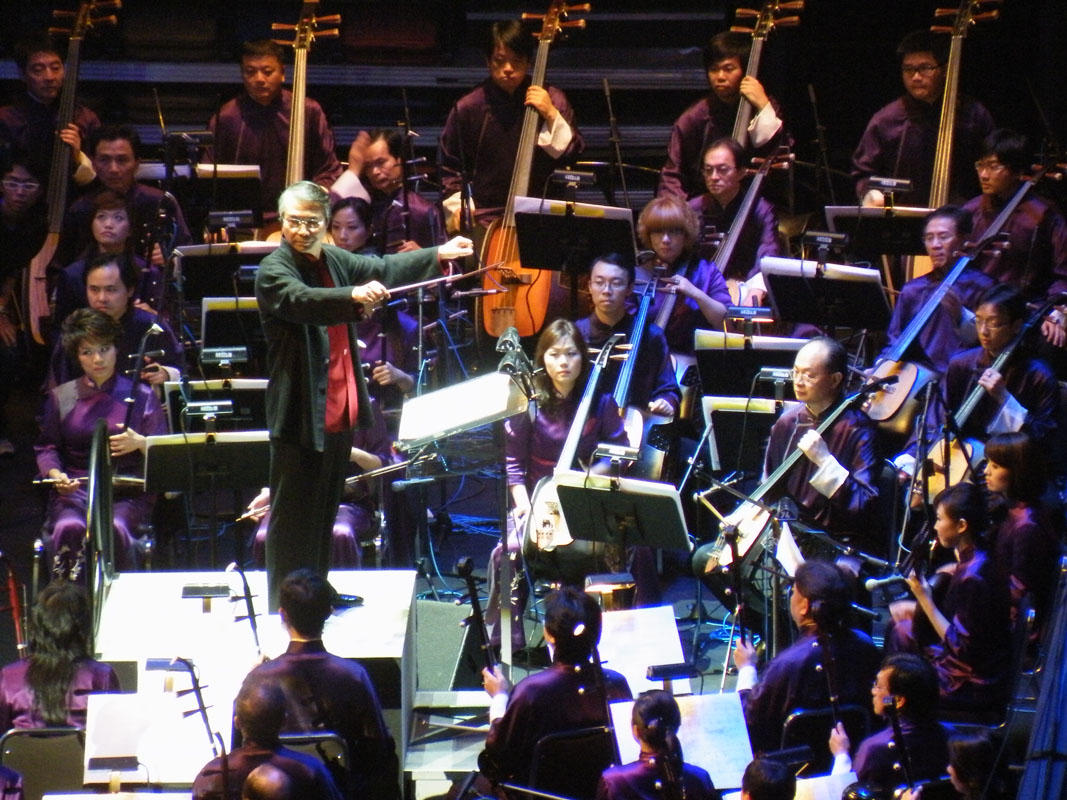
Hong Kong Chinese Orchestra

The Hong Kong Chinese Orchestra (Chinese: 香港中樂團; abbreviated HKCO) was founded in 1977. The orchestra has won the accolades as “a leader in Chinese ethnic music” and “a cultural ambassador of Hong Kong”. It is often invited to perform at famous venues and festivals all over the world, having covered Europe, North America, Asia, Australia and the Arctic Circle to date. It has been acclaimed as a leader among full-sized Chinese music ensembles in the international arena today.

The Orchestra has an establishment of 91 professional musicians playing in four sections: bowed-strings, plucked-strings, wind and percussion. The instruments include both the traditional and the improved, new versions. The bowed-string section has been using the Eco-Huqin series developed by the Orchestra since 2009, and is capable of performing both traditional Chinese music and contemporary, full-length works in a variety of musical formats and contents. The Orchestra also explores new frontiers in music through commissioning about 2,300 new works of various types and styles, whether as original compositions or arrangements.

== Background ==
The HKCO was founded in 1977 by the Urban Council. Ng Tai Kong who was conductor at a Chinese orchestra in Singapore was invited back to take helm at the orchestra. Between January 2000 and March 2001, it was funded and managed by the government's Leisure and Cultural Services Department, but became an independent body under the management of the Hong Kong Chinese Orchestra Limited in April 2001. Its repertoire includes traditional, contemporary, and popular pieces, and it has commissioned numerous works by local composers from Hong Kong as well as Chinese composers around the world. In October 2002, the Orchestra was awarded for "The Most Outstanding Achievement in Advancing Contemporary Chinese Music" by the International Society of Contemporary Music.

It achieved a number of world records as recorded by Guinness Book of Records. In 2001, it recorded the largest number of people performing the erhu at the same time with a thousand players performing at a mass performance entitled Music from a Thousand Strings. In 2003, in a drum festival, it features the biggest Peace Drum (Taiping gu) and Gong with 3,000 drummers from local organisations and school playing a drum piece, "The Earth Shall Move", and in 2005, it set another world record for having the largest number of people playing the dizi together in the Dizi and Xiao Festival 2005.

== Performances and activities ==
Apart from regular concerts and activities promoting arts education, the Orchestra has initiated several instrumental festivals, including the Hong Kong International Youth Chinese Music Festival, to honour its mission statement that “Music is to be shared”. Together with the citizens of Hong Kong, the Orchestra has achieved many Guinness World Records for having the largest number of people playing musical instruments at the same time. The Hong Kong Drum Festival, which the Orchestra launched in 2003, is now into its 16th year with no interruption in between, and has become a keenly-anticipated annual cultural event.

Striving to ensure the transmission and development of Chinese music, the Orchestra has organized many symposia and competitions. Notable examples in recent years are ‘The International Composition Prize 2013’ co-organized with the Luxembourg Society for Contemporary Music, and the ‘Chinese Music Without Bounds - International Composition Competition’ in 2017. They have been acclaimed as platforms for composers to publish their new works and for musical exchange. A milestone event is the world's first ever ‘International Conducting Competition for Chinese Music’, which the Orchestra organized in 2011.

Other accolades and acclaims the Orchestra has won are its achievements in the arts, governance and administration, arts education, marketing and promotion. The Eco-Huqin series which the Orchestra developed has won not only the 4th Ministry of Culture Innovation Award in 2012, but also many other awards presented by various institutions for its green and innovative concepts. They add to the remarkable and highly commendable list of achievements in the history of the Hong Kong Chinese Orchestra.

Awards
Preceded by Liza Wang	Golden Needle Award of RTHK Top Ten Chinese Gold Songs Award; 2005	Succeeded by Adam Cheng
