= Wu Yangjie =

Chinese organic chemist

Wu Yangjie (Chinese: 吴养洁; born 1 January 1928) is a Chinese organic chemist and a professor at Zhengzhou University. He is an academician of the Chinese Academy of Sciences.

== Biography ==
Wu was born 1 January 1928 in Jinan, Shandong, Republic of China. He graduated from the Department of Chemistry of Fudan University in 1951, and was hired as a faculty member by the university. In September 1954, he began his graduate studies in the Department of Chemistry of the Moscow State University, and earned his associate doctor degree (Ph.D. equivalent) in June 1958.

After returning to China, Wu was assigned to the newly founded Zhengzhou University to help establish its chemistry department, where he worked for the rest of his career. He later served as chairman of the department and a doctoral advisor.

Wu published more than 160 research articles. He won a National Science Congress Award in 1978, and the Henan Science and Technology Progress Award (First Class) in 2001. He was elected an academician of the Chinese Academy of Sciences in 2003.
