= Dongfang Electric =

Electrical engineering company of China

Dongfang Electric Corporation 东方电气集团
- Type: Public
- Industry: Power plant equipment manufacturing
- Founded: 1984
- Founder: Ding Yi
- Headquarters: Chengdu, Sichuan, China
- Area served: Worldwide
- Key people: Wang Ji (王计) (Chairman)
- Revenue: 32,324,500,000 renminbi (2018)
- Subsidiaries: Dongfang Electric Corporation Limited
- Website: Dongfang Electric Corporation; Dongfang Electric Corporation Limited

Dongfang Electric Corporation (Chinese: 东方电气集团) is a Chinese state-owned manufacturer of power generators and the contracts of power station projects. According to Platts, in 2009-10 the company was the second largest manufacturer of steam turbines by worldwide market share, tying with Harbin Electric and slightly behind Shanghai Electric. The company currently operates the world's most powerful wind turbine by installed capacity, at 18 MW.

== History ==
It was founded in 1984 and is based in Chengdu, Sichuan. Its subsidiary is Dongfang Electric Corporation Limited (Chinese: 东方电气股份有限公司) (SEHK: 1072, SSE: 600875). Its H shares and A shares were listed on the Hong Kong and Shanghai.

- 1958: Dongfang Electric Machinery Plant (Chinese: 东方电机厂) was established.
- 1984: Dongfang Electric Corporation was established by Ding Yi.
- 1993: China Dongfang Electric Machinery Plant was restructured to form Dongfang Electric Machinery Company Limited (Chinese: 东方电机股份有限公司).
- 1994: Dongfang Electric Machinery Company was listed on the Hong Kong Stock Exchange.
- 1995: Dongfang Electric Machinery Company was listed on the Shanghai Stock Exchange.
- 2007: China Dongfang Electric Corporation was listed entirely in Dongfang Electric Machinery Company. Dongfang Electric Machinery Company was renamed to Dongfang Electric Corporation Limited (Chinese: 东方电气股份有限公司).

== Controversy ==
Dongfang was accused by General Electric in court papers of benefitting from a rigged tendering process awarded by South African utility giant Eskom to install a new boiler at the Duvha Power Station. General Electric claims that Dongfang got the contract even though its bid was R1 billion (US$76 million) more than the General Electric bid.

== See also ==
- List of wind turbine manufacturers
- Wind energy companies of China
- Wind power
