= Dinh (surname) =

Dinh (丁) is a Vietnamese surname. In Vietnam, the surname is spelled Đinh or Đình, but the latter is very rare in Vietnamese.

== Notable people ==
- Andy Dinh, Team SoloMid owner, player
- Dan Dinh, League of Legends player, brother of Andy Dinh
- Đinh Xuân Lưu, Vietnamese ambassador to Poland and Israel
- Viet D. Dinh (born 1968), lawyer, former US Assistant Attorney General, and chief architect of the Patriot Act

== See also ==
- Ding (surname)
- Đinh dynasty
