= Tsung Yeh =

Chinese conductor (born 1950)

- 葉聰
- Born: May 17, 1950 (age 76); Shanghai, China
- Education: Shanghai Conservatory of Music Mannes College of Music Yale University
- Occupation: Conductor
- Employer: Singapore Chinese Orchestra
- Spouse: Wong Sau Lan
- Awards: Cultural Medallion

Yeh Tsung (born 17 May 1950), better known as Tsung Yeh, is a Chinese conductor. He was the world’s first conductor to hold music directorship of a Western symphony orchestra and a Chinese orchestra simultaneously, being the musical director of both the Singapore Chinese Orchestra and the South Bend Symphony Orchestra in the United States, although he left the South Bend Symphony Orchestra in 2016.

== Early life and education ==
Yeh was born on 17 May 1950 in Shanghai, China. His father was a businessman and later a professor at the Shanghai Institute of Foreign Trade, and his mother was a professor at the Shanghai Conservatory of Music, and began sending him for piano lessons when he was five. Yeh studied in the Shanghai Conservatory of Music through an elementary school music programme in 1960. However, in 1966, his studies were interrupted by the Cultural Revolution, during which both of his parents were detained by authorities due to suspicions that they were foreign spies, as they could speak English and had acquaintances from the west. His parents were released after a few days, but his father was placed on house arrest for three months, while his mother was placed on house arrest for a year. During the revolution, Yeh remained a student of the conservatory, despite the banning of European music. However, Yeh was eventually able to persuade a teacher to teach him the works of Frédéric Chopin in secret.

== Career ==
Yeh graduated from the conservatory in 1972, and was sent to an arts college in Hefei to become a piano teacher for "re-education" in 1975. After the end of the revolution, Yeh joined the Oriental Sound and Dance Troupe as a pianist in 1977. With the troupe, he toured in Thailand and Singapore, during which he gained the thought of leaving and China. In 1979, after watching concerts by the Boston Symphony Orchestra and the Berlin Philharmonic, Yeh decided to return to the Shanghai Conservatory of Music to study conducting. After he completed his studies in the conservatory, Yeh won a scholarship in for the Mannes College of Music in New York City, and graduated in 1983. He then studied at the Yale University after receiving a scholarship for a postgraduate music programme.

In 1984, Yeh won the Exxon/Arts Endowment Award, and became the assistant conductor of the St. Louis Symphony Orchestra, and the principal conductor of the St. Louis Symphony Youth Orchestra. Somewhere from 1987-1989, he was the resident conductor of the Florida Orchestra and the principal guest conductor of the Albany Symphony Orchestra. He was appointed the musical director of the South Bend Symphony Orchestra on 10 April 1988. In 1995, he and the orchestra were awarded the American Society of Composers, Authors and Publishers Award in Excellence in Programming and Performing.

Yeh was appointed the music director of the Singapore Chinese Orchestra in January 2002, despite still being based in America. By then, he was also the conductor laureate of the Hong Kong Sinfonietta. The decision for him to take over as music director was first announced in December 2001. When Yeh took over as music director, he initiated a project in which he began to blend the traditional Chinese music which the orchestra typically played, with several musical genres such as jazz and rock. He began the project as he believed that adapting the orchestra in this way would help it stay relevant and ahead of the competition. In 2005, he renewed his contract for the Singapore Chinese Orchestra. In 2005, Yeh, along with the Singapore Chinese Orchestra, went on tour in Europe, and was the first Chinese orchestra to perform at the Barbican Centre in London. The orchestra has also toured in China under his directorship.

Yeh renewed his contract with the Singapore Chinese Orchestra again in 2011. He was awarded the Cultural Medallion in 2013 for his work with the Singapore Chinese Orchestra. He left the South Bend Symphony Orchestra in 2016 and held his last concert with the orchestra on 7 May 2016. Yeh, along with conductors Hu Bing Xu and Choo Hoey, conducted a special performance to commemorate the Singapore Chinese Orchestra's 20th Anniversary.

== Personal life ==
Yeh is married to Wong Sau Lan, whom he first met in the 1980s, and together they have three children, named Mona, Melina and Joseph. All of his children were born in the United States. Yeh became a permanent resident of Singapore in 2004. In 2016, after leaving the South Bend Symphony Orchestra, he and his family moved to Tanjong Pagar in Singapore.
