= Ding Yi (businessman) =

Chinese electrical engineer and business executive (1927–2019)

Ding Yi (Chinese: 丁一; June 1927 – 5 March 2019) was a Chinese electrical engineer and business executive. He established the state-owned Dongfang Electric Corporation in 1984 and served as its general manager for ten years.

== Biography ==
Ding Yi was born in June 1927 as Xu Weiwen (徐纬文), in Penglai, Shandong, Republic of China. During the Second Sino-Japanese War, he joined the Communist resistance in April 1944, and changed his name to Ding Yi.

After the founding of the People's Republic of China, Ding entered Tsinghua University in 1950. In 1951, he was sent to study in the Soviet Union, together with Li Peng (later Premier of China) and Zou Jiahua (later Vice Premier). After graduating from the Leningrad Institute of Technology in 1957, he worked at Harbin Turbine Factory in Northeast China, and was later promoted to deputy chief engineer.

In 1967, Ding was transferred to Sichuan as part of the Third Front Movement, and served as chief engineer, and later head of the Dongfang Turbine Factory.

During the reform and opening era, Ding was tasked with reorganizing Dongfang Turbine Factory and establishing Dongfang Electric Corporation in March 1984. He served as the first general manager and chairman of the company for the next ten years. Under his leadership, Dongfang developed into one of the world's largest electrical engineering companies. By the time of his retirement in 1994, Dongfang was ranked as the world's 120th largest engineering contractor.

During the Great Sichuan earthquake of May 2008, the original Dongfang Turbine Factory in Hanwang, Sichuan was severely damaged. The earthquake killed many Dongfang employees and caused economic damages estimated at 2.7 billion yuan. At the time, Ding was hospitalized in Beijing for medical treatment. When Dongfang Electric began rebuilding the factory in Deyang in August, Ding donated more than 200,000 yuan of his savings to the company to help with reconstruction. Over more than 10 years, he also donated over 100,000 yuan to support college students from poor families.

Ding died on 5 March 2019 at Huaxi Hospital in Chengdu at the age of 91.
