= Ding Yi (admiral) =

Chinese vice admiral

- 丁毅

Deputy Commander of the PLA Navy
- Incumbent
- Assumed office 2013
- Commander: Wu Shengli
- Preceded by: Zhang Yongyi

Personal details
- Born: October 1959 (age 66) Leiyang, Hunan
- Party: Chinese Communist Party

Military service
- Allegiance: China
- Branch/service: People's Liberation Army Navy
- Years of service: ? − present
- Rank: Vice Admiral

Ding Yi (Chinese: 丁毅; pinyin: Dīng Yì; born October 1959) is a naval aviator and vice admiral of the Chinese People's Liberation Army Navy (PLAN). He has served as Deputy Commander of the PLAN since 2013.

== Biography ==
Ding was born in October 1959 in Leiyang, Hunan Province. He began his military career as a naval aviator, and served as commander of an aviation division in the East Sea Fleet, deputy chief of staff the North Sea Fleet, and deputy commander and then commander of the PLA Naval Air Force. In 2013, he was promoted to deputy commander of the PLA Navy. He attained the rank of vice admiral (zhong jiang) on 10 July 2014.
