= Singer season 4 =

Singer
- Season 4
- Hosted by: Hacken Lee (Episode 1–11); Hacken Lee and all participating Breakout singers (Breakout); He Jiong (final round, 2016 Biennial Concert)
- Judges: 500 public audiences
- Winner: Coco Lee
- Runner-up: Jeff Chang
- Finals venue: Hunan Broadcasting System

Release
- Original network: Hunan Television
- Original release: January 15 – April 15, 2016

Season chronology
- ← Previous; Season 3 Next → Season 5

I Am a Singer is the fourth season of the Chinese version of the South Korean reality show I Am a Singer. The show was broadcast on Hunan Television in 2016. Due to the sudden banning of Korean entertainment in China in November 2016, this was currently the last season to feature Korean singers in the competition. It was also the last season to use the I Am a Singer title, before renaming to Singer with effect from the next season.

The season premiered on 15 January 2016, and concluded on 15 April 2016. On the finals aired 8 April 2016, Hong Kong-American singer Coco Lee was the winner of the season, becoming the first non-mainland Chinese national to win the show. Jeff Chang came in second, and Korean singer Hwang Chi-yeul finished third place.

== Competition format ==
Most of the competition followed the same format as the previous series, including the Challenge rounds debuted in the last season. Like the previous seasons, the votes counted from both the Qualifier and Knockout rounds determined which singer was eliminated for the night. The Challenge round which introduced in the previous season also return, with an added rule where singers had to rank in the top four (4th place or better) to remain in the competition.

=== I Am a Singer- Who Will Challenge ===
An online Spin-off of the show, I Am a Singer- Who Will Challenge (我是歌手—誰來踢館) was aired daily from 5 December 2015, until the finale on 23 January 2016, on the online site of Mango TV, for a total of 50 days.

The site featured each contestant having their own Challenge page, where online viewers were able recommend the singers in participating the competition. When a singer's recommendation hit at least 18,000 views, they were eligible to participate in a daily live show aired between 5 December 2015, until 7 January 2016. During each episode's broadcast, viewers could distribute their 100 "Decibel points" to the singers they liked the most on each show.

The top eight singers accumulating the most 'Decibel points' after 7 January moved on to the Sing-off. During each night's broadcast until 15 January, two random singers had to sing one song each, with a total of three songs throughout the eight shows. 10,000 viewers were chosen at random. These viewers distributed their 100 "Decibel points" to determine the contestants placement in the sing-off as well as in the finale. The second week's shows that aired from 16 January until 22 January featured the singer's daily lives and their preparations up to the finale.

The finale aired 23 January and showcased the eight singers for the last time, each singing two songs (one chosen song and one hit song from previous seasons). In each round, 10,000 "Decibel points were distributed to random viewers eligible to cast their votes for the winner (viewers had to vote for three singers to be counted as a valid vote). The singer accumulating the most votes after two songs would win the right to take part in the competition as a Challenger on the third Challenge round.

Korean singer Kim Ji-Mun was named as the winner of I Am a Singer- Who Will Challenge.

=== Tiebreaker ===
A tiebreaker can occur when multiple singers were tied with the lowest votes cast during an elimination round. The tie is resolved based on the placements in the next round, and the singer receiving a lower placement (regardless of the placements from other singers) was eliminated. Any eliminations (if applicable) in the following round would conduct as normal.

== Contestants ==
The following singers participated in the fourth season are listed in alphabetical order (singers without a placement for the final is listed as finalist and singers withdrew were listed as withdrawn):

Key:

– Winner
– Runner-up
– Third place
– Other finalist

Contestant	Country/Region	Manager	Status	Week Entered	Week Exited	Result
Jeff Chang	Taiwan	Shen Mengchen	Substitute singer	Week 4 (qualifier round 2)	Week 13 (finals)	Runner-up
Chao Chuan	Taiwan	Li Rui	Initial singer	Week 1 (qualifier round 1)	Week 5 (knockout round 2); Week 12 (Breakout round)	Eliminated
Guan Zhe	China	Ryan	Initial singer	Week 1 (qualifier round 1)	Week 2 (knockout round 1); Week 12 (Breakout round)	Eliminated
HAYA Band	China	Wayne Zhang	Initial singer	Week 1 (qualifier round 1)	Week 2 (knockout round 1); Week 12 (Breakout round)	Eliminated
LaLa Hsu	Taiwan	Leo Li	Initial singer	Week 1 (qualifier round 1)	Week 13 (finals)	Finalist (4th-6th place)
Hwang Chi Yeul	South Korea	Zhang Yu'an	Initial singer	Week 1 (qualifier round 1)	Week 13 (finals)	Third place
Kim Ji Mun	China	Aaron Sun Pu	Challenger	Week 9 (challenge round 3)	Week 9 (challenge round 3); Week 12 (Breakout round)	Eliminated
Lao Lang	China	Eliza Liang	Substitute singer	Week 10 (qualifier round 4)	Week 13 (finals)	Finalist (4th-6th place)
Coco Lee	Hong Kong/United States	Shen Ling	Initial singer	Week 1 (qualifier round 1)	Week 13 (finals)	Winner
Hacken Lee	Hong Kong	Li Weijia	Initial singer	Week 1 (qualifier round 1)	Week 13 (finals)	Finalist (4th-6th place)
Shin	Taiwan	Cindy Sun	Initial singer	Week 1 (qualifier round 1)	Week 6 (challenge round 2); Week 12 (Breakout round)	Eliminated
Su Yunying	China	Wang Qiao	Challenger	Week 3 (challenge round 1)	Week 3 (challenge round 1); Week 12 (Breakout round)	Eliminated
Elvis Wang	China	Yan Wei	Challenger	Week 6 (challenge round 2)	Week 8 (knockout round 3); Week 12 (Breakout round); Week 13 (Finals)	8th place
Joey Yung	Hong Kong	Rolling Wang	Substitute singer	Week 7 (qualifier round 3)	Week 13 (finals)	7th place

=== Future appearances ===
Coco Lee later returned as a guest performer on the fifth and sixth seasons. Kim Ji Mun later appeared on the seventh season as a guest performer for Yang Kun. Lala Hsu returned to compete for a second time on the eighth season.

== Results ==
First	Safe	Bottom	Eliminated	Return performance	Challenger
Challenge success	Challenge failure	Breakout success	Breakout failure	Winner	Runner-up

	Singer	Broadcast date (2016)													
	Singer	15 Jan	22 Jan	29 Jan	5 Feb	12 Feb	19 Feb	26 Feb	4 Mar	11 Mar	18 Mar	25 Mar	1 Apr	8 Apr	
	Singer	1st round			2nd round			3rd round			4th round		Breakout	Final round	
	Singer	Qualifying	Knockout	Challenge	Qualifying	Knockout	Challenge	Qualifying	Knockout	Challenge	Qualifying	Knockout	Breakout	1st round	2nd round
1	Coco Lee	6	1	2	4	1	4	1	7	2	5	2	—	1	1
2	Jeff Chang	—	—	—	2	5	5	6	2	1	4	6	1	3	2
3	Hwang Chi Yeul	2	2	3	1	6	3	4	1	4	1	4	—	2	3
=4	Hacken Lee	3	5	1	5	3	2	5	6	5	2	1	—	5	—
=4	LaLa Hsu	1	6	4	3	2	6	2	4	7	3	5	—	6	—
=4	Lao Lang	—	—	—	—	—	—	—	—	—	6	7	3	4	—
7	Joey Yung	—	—	—	—	—	—	3	5	3	7	3	2	7	—
=8	Elvis Wang	—	—	—	—	—	1	7	3	—	—	—	4	—	—
=8	Chao Chuan	5	3	6	7	7	—	—	—	—	—	—	5	—	—
=8	Shin	4	7	7	6	4	7	—	—	—	—	—	6	—	—
=8	Kim Ji Mun	—	—	—	—	—	—	—	—	6	—	—	7	—	—
=8	Su Yunying	—	—	5	—	—	—	—	—	—	—	—	8	—	—
=8	HAYA Band	7	4	—	—	—	—	—	—	—	—	—	9	—	—
=8	Guan Zhe	7	8	—	—	—	—	—	—	—	—	—	10	—	—

== Competition details ==
=== 1st round ===
==== Qualifying (scramble tournament) ====
- Taping Date: 7 January 2016
- Airdate: 15 January 2016

For the first time in the show's history, as there were eight first round singers instead of seven, this round featured elimination. The singer receiving the lowest number of votes would be immediately eliminated; however, no one was eliminated as the bottom two singers were tied for 7th.

I Am a Singer season 4 1st qualifying round (scramble tournament) 15 January 2016 Host: Hacken Lee
Order of Performance	Singer	Comedian Manager	Song Title	Original Singer	Lyrics	Composer	Arranger	Ranking	Singer voting
1	HAYA Band	Wayne Zhang	"蒼狼大地"	Tengger	布和傲斯爾; Tengger	Tengger	HAYA Band	7 (Tie)	2
2	Hwang Chi Yeul	Zhang Yu'an	"那個人" (Korean)	Lee Seung Chul	Kim Sang Ik; Park Seul Hwa	Hong Jin Young	Kang Hwa Seong	2	—
3	Coco Lee	Shen Ling	"想念你"	Harlem Yu	吳正奇 林愷	Harlem Yu; Lee Zheng Fan	Kubert Leung	6	1
4	Hacken Lee	Li Weijia	"霧之戀" (Cantonese)	Alan Tam	Andrew Lam	Suzuki Kisaburō	Johnny Yim ^{[a]}	3	—
5	Chao Chuan	Li Rui	"愛要怎麼說出口"	Chao Chuan	Jonathan Lee		劉迦寧 周以力	5	—
6	Guan Zhe	Ryan	"如果分開我也愛你"	Guan Zhe			Terence Teo	7 (Tie)	—
7	LaLa Hsu	Leo Li	"失落沙洲"	LaLa Hsu			Zheng Nan	1	—
8	Shin	Cindy	"告別的時代"	Shin	Lin Xi	Yang Jung Seung	陳熙	4	—

==== Knockout ====
- Taping Date: 14 January 2016
- Airdate: 21 January 2016

The round features its first-ever (and the series' only) tiebreaker of the series; between the two singers (HAYA band and Zhe) who tied for 7th on the last round, the one with the lower vote would be eliminated regardless of the overall placement. Eliminations for the round went ahead as normal; of the remaining seven singers, the singer with the lowest combined votes will also be eliminated.

I Am a Singer Season 4 1st Knockout Round 22 January 2016 Host: Hacken Lee
Order of Performance	Singer	Comedian Manager	Song Title	Original Singer	Lyrics	Composer	Arranger	Ranking	Singer Voting
1	LaLa Hsu	Leo Li	"修煉愛情"	JJ Lin	Yee Kar Yeung	JJ Lin	Zheng Nan	6	—
2	Hwang Chi Yeul	Zhang Yu'an	"從開始到現在"	Jeff Chang (Mandarin)	Francis Lee	吳熙俊 劉海俊	Kang Hwa Seong	2	—
2	Hwang Chi Yeul	Zhang Yu'an	"從開始到現在"	Ryu (Korean)	Min Kwan Hong	吳熙俊 劉海俊	Kang Hwa Seong	2	—
3	Guan Zhe	Ryan	"神奇"	Stefanie Sun	Karey	Lee Shih Shiong	多劍平; Guan Zhe	8	—
4	Chao Chuan	Li Rui	"飛得更高"	Wang Feng			劉文仁	3	
5	Shin	Cindy	"人質"	A-mei; Aska Yang	冷玩妹	黃韻仁	黃雨勳	7	—
6	Hacken Lee	Li Weijia	"當我知道你們相愛"	Aaron Kwok	Siu Mei		Johnny Yim	5	—
7	HAYA Band	Wayne Zhang	"飛翔的鷹"	HAYA Band	科爾沁夫	HAYA Band	Rama	4	2
8	Coco Lee	Shen Ling	"愛的初體驗"	Chang Chen-yue			Chiu Tsang Hei	1	

==== Overall ranking ====
Guan Zhe was eliminated for losing the tie-breaker while HAYA Band was eliminated for receiving a lower count of overall votes; ironically, the two eliminated singers coincidentally received the bottom two count of overall votes.

I Am a Singer Season 4 1st round overall ranking
Ranking	Singer	Match 1 Percentages of Votes (Ranking)	Match 2 Percentages of Votes (Ranking)	Total Percentages of Votes
1	Coco Lee	9.05% (6)	26.30% (1) ^{[a]}	17.64%
2	Hwang Chi Yeul	17.30% (2)	13.45% (2)	15.39%
3	Hacken Lee	16.90% (3)	11.76% (5) ^{[b]}	14.34%
4	LaLa Hsu	18.51% (1)	9.53% (6)	14.04%
5	Chao Chuan	11.73% (5) ^{[c]}	12.30% (3)	12.02%
6	Shin	12.13% (4)	7.36% (7)	9.76%
7	HAYA Band	7.17% (7)	12.03% (4)	9.59%
8	Guan Zhe	7.17% (7)	7.23% (8)	7.20%

A. Coco Lee received 389 votes this round.
B. Four votes less than 4th.
C. Six votes less than 4th.

==== Challenge ====
- Taping Date: 21 January 2016
- Airdate: 29 January 2016

Su Yunying was the first challenger of the season; Shin would have been eliminated for finishing last, however, Su was unsuccessful in her challenge (placed 5th) and she was eliminated instead. Chuan was originally going to perform "白天不懂夜的黑" this week, but later changed to "Hotel California" as Chuan decided to pay tribute to the late-Eagles founder and lead singer Glenn Frey, who died the day before taping.

I Am a Singer Season 4 1st Challenge Round 29 January 2016 Host: Hacken Lee
Order of Performance	Singer	Comedian Manager	Song Title	Original Singer	Lyrics	Composer	Arranger	Ranking	Singer Voting
1	Chao Chuan	Li Rui	"Hotel California" (Mandarin)	Eagles	Don Felder; Don Henley; Glenn Frey		Kubert Leung	6	2
2	Shin	Cindy	"刀馬旦"	Coco Lee	Vincent Fang	Jay Chou	Joy	7	-
3	Hacken Lee	Li Weijia	"遙遠的她" (Cantonese)	Jacky Cheung	Poon Yuen Leung	Tanimura Shinji	Johnny Yim ^{[c]}	1	-
4	LaLa Hsu	Leo Li	"不醉不會" (Mandarin)	Hebe Tien	Lin Xi	Liu Da Jiang	Zheng Nan	4	-
Band show: Drummer (郝稷倫), Bassist (韓陽)
5	Coco Lee	Shen Ling	"Price Tag" (English)	Jessie J	Jessica Cornish; Dr. Luke; Claude Kelly; Bobby Ray Simmons, Jr.		Nick Pyo	2	1
6	Hwang Chi Yeul	Zhang Yu'an	"一路上有你"	Jacky Cheung	謝明訓	片山圭司	Johnny Yim	3	3 (Tie)
7	Su Yunying	Wang Qiao	"野子"	Su Yunying			Kubert Leung	5	3 (Tie)
8	Guan Zhe	Ryan	"你是愛我的"	A-mei	鄔裕康	楊陽	Terence Teo	Return Performance	
9	HAYA Band	Wayne Zhang	"寂靜的天空" (Mandarin/Mongolian)	HAYA Band				Return Performance	

===== Percentages of votes =====
I Am a Singer Season 4 1st Challenge Round Percentages of votes
Ranking	Singer	Number of votes	Percentages of votes
1	Hacken Lee	354	27.20%
2	Coco Lee	347	26.67%
3	Hwang Chi Yeul	173	13.29%
4	Lala Hsu	162	12.45%
5	Su Yunying	148	11.37%
6	Chao Chuan	62	4.76%
7	Shin	55	4.22%
Total valid votes		1301

=== 2nd round ===
==== Qualifying ====
- Taping Date: 27 January 2016
- Airdate: 5 February 2016

Jeff Chang was the first substitute singer of the season.

I Am a Singer Season 4 2nd Qualifying Round 5 February 2016 Host: Hacken Lee
Order of Performance	Singer	Comedian Manager	Song Title	Original Singer	Lyrics	Composer	Arranger	Ranking	Singer Voting
1	Hacken Lee	Li Weijia	"謝謝你的愛"	Andy Lau	Eric Lin	熊美玲	Johnny Yim	5	—
1	Hacken Lee	Li Weijia	"一起走過的日子" (Cantonese)	Andy Lau	Siu Mei	胡偉立	Johnny Yim	5	—
2	Su Yunying	Wang Qiao	"我"	Jolin Tsai	Xiaohan	Jolin Tsai	Kubert Leung	Return Performance	
3	Chao Chuan	Li Rui	"大地"	Beyond	Gene Lau	Wong Ka Kui	Terence Teo	7	—
4	Shin	Cindy	"Still Loving You" (English)	Scorpions	Klaus Meine	Rudolf Schenker	Kubert Leung	6	3 (Tie)
5	Hwang Chi Yeul	Zhang Yu'an	"Bang Bang Bang" (Korean, Mandarin)	BigBang	TEDDY; G-Dragon; T.O.P	TEDDY; G-Dragon	Shin Seung-Ick	1	
Band show: Percussion (劉效松)
6	Coco Lee	Shen Ling	"你"	Jam Hsiao		Hanjin Tan		4	3 (Tie)
7	LaLa Hsu	Leo Li	"莉莉安"	Song Dongye			Zheng Nan	3	—
8	Jeff Chang	Shen Mengchen	"信仰"	Jeff Chang	Chan Yiu Chuen; Yee Kar Yeung	Chan Yiu Chuen	屠穎	2	

==== Knockout ====
- Taping Date: 3 February 2016
- Airdate: 12 February 2016

I Am a Singer Season 4 2nd Knockout Round 12 February 2016 Host: Hacken Lee
Order of Performance	Singer	Comedian Manager	Song Title	Original Singer	Lyrics	Composer	Arranger	Ranking	Singer Voting
1	Chao Chuan	Li Rui	"征服"	Na Ying	John		Redd Kross; Terence Teo	7	3 (Tie)
2	Hacken Lee	Li Weijia	"單車" (Cantonese)	Eason Chan	Wyman Wong	Jim Lau	Chiu Tsang Hei; Lincoln Lam	3	—
3	LaLa Hsu	Leo Li	"我好想你"	Sodagreen	Wu Tsing Fong		Zheng Nan	2	3 (Tie)
4	Coco Lee	Shen Ling	"Nobody" (English)	Wonder Girls	JY Park		Nick Pyo	1	2
5	Hwang Chi Yeul	Zhang Yu'an	"默"	Na Ying	尹約	錢雷	全相煥 權博士	6	—
Band show: Keyboard
6	Jeff Chang	Shen Mengchen	"二十年以前" (Mandarin/English)	Bobby Chen		Michael Noble; Wood Newton; C. Michael Spriggs; Dan Tyler	PheBe Chou	5	—
7	Shin	Cindy	"Gangnam Style" (Korean)	Psy	Psy; Yoo Gun hyung		Joy	4	1

==== Overall ranking ====
I Am a Singer Season 4 2nd round overall ranking
Ranking	Singer	Match 1 Percentages of Votes (Ranking)	Match 2 Percentages of Votes (Ranking)	Total Percentages of Votes
1	Coco Lee	13.49% (4)	23.39% (1) ^{[a]}	18.51%
2	LaLa Hsu	16.95% (3)	18.88% (2)	17.93%
3	Hwang Chi Yeul	21.73% (1)	11.02% (6)	16.29%
4	Jeff Chang	20.89% (2)	11.69% (5)	16.22%
5	Hacken Lee	10.93% (5)	15.12% (3)	13.05%
6	Shin	10.44% (6)	11.89% (4)	11.18%
7	Chao Chuan	5.53% (7)	7.99% (7)	6.78%

A. Coco Lee received 348 votes this round.

==== Challenge ====
- Taping Date: 10 February 2016
- Airdate: 19 February 2016

Elvis Wang was the second challenger of the season.

I Am a Singer Season 4 2nd Challenge Round 19 February 2016 Host: Hacken Lee
Order of Performance	Singer	Comedian Manager	Song Title	Original Singer	Lyrics	Composer	Arranger	Ranking	Singer Voting
1	Hwang Chi Yeul	Zhang Yu'an	"Go Hae" (Korean)	Yim Jae-beom	CHAE JUNG UN	SONG JEA JOON; IM JAI BEON	全相煥 權博士; Lukas	3	—
2	Coco Lee	Shen Ling	"喜氣洋洋" (Cantonese)	Paula Tsui	Cheng Kwok Kong	Mayumi Itsuwa	Nick Pyo	4	—
2	Coco Lee	Shen Ling	"寶貝對不起"	Grasshopper	謝明訓	A.Chotikul	Nick Pyo	4	—
2	Coco Lee	Shen Ling	"Sha La La" (English)	Walkers	Poul Dehnhardt	Torben Lendager	Nick Pyo	4	—
3	LaLa Hsu	Leo Li	"喜歡你"	Kit Chan	Liang Wern Fook		Zheng Nan	6	—
4	Hacken Lee	Li Weijia	"友情歲月" (Cantonese)	Ekin Cheng	Gene Lau	Chan Kwong Wing	Johnny Yim	2	1
Band show: Guitar Wong Chung Yin, Tommy Chan）
5	Jeff Chang	Shen Mengchen	"愛的箴言"	Lo Ta Yu			Mac Chou	5	2 (Tie)
6	Shin	Cindy	"末班車"	Hsiao Huang Chi	馬嵩惟	Lee Wei Shiong	陳熙	7	—
7	Elvis Wang	Yan Wei	"Besame Mucho" (Spanish)	Emilio Tuero	Consuelo Velazquez		劉卓	1	2 (Tie)
8	Chao Chuan	Li Rui	"每次都想呼喊你的名字"	David Lee	姚凱祿		Terence Teo	Return Performance	

=== 3rd round ===
==== Qualifying ====
- Taping Date: 17 February 2016
- Airdate: 26 February 2016

Joey Yung was the second substitute singer of the season. During the episode, Yung was prompted to redo her recording twice after her radio equipment malfunctioned.

I Am a Singer Season 4 3rd Qualifying Round 26 February 2016 Host: Hacken Lee
Order of Performance	Singer	Comedian Manager	Song Title	Original Singer	Lyrics	Composer	Arranger	Ranking	Song Voting
1	Jeff Chang	Shen Mengchen	"微光"	Hua Chenyu	周潔穎	錢雷	Mac Chou	6	—
2	Hwang Chi Yeul	Zhang Yu'an	"一個人的天荒地老"	Phil Chang	十一郎	Phil Chang	姜和成	4	—
3	Coco Lee	Shen Ling	"What's Up" (English)	4 Non Blondes	Linda Perry		Kubert Leung	1	
4	Elvis Wang	Yan Wei	"重來"	Tiger Huang	Tanya Chua		羅俊霖 王淳	7	—
5	Shin	Cindy	"彩虹"	A-mei	陳鎮川	阿弟仔	Joy	Return Performance	
6	Hacken Lee	Li Weijia	"風繼續吹" (Cantonese)	Leslie Cheung	Cheng Kwok Kong	Ryudo Uzaki	Gary Tong	5	—
Band show: 愛之音合音組
7	LaLa Hsu	Leo Li	"不痛"	Angela Chang	Huang Yun Ru; Chen Hwai En	Chen Hwai En	Zheng Nan	2	—
8	Joey Yung	Rolling Wang	"Half Moon Serenade" (Cantonese)	Hacken Lee	Jolland Chan	河合奈保子	褚鎮東; Schumann	3	2

==== Knockout ====
- Taping Date: 25 February 2016
- Airdate: 4 March 2016

Chang and Coco were originally going to perform 2nd and 6th, respectively, but swapped by mutual agreement as Coco caught a bad cold.

I Am a Singer Season 4 3rd Knockout Round 4 March 2016 Host: Hacken Lee
Order of Performance	Singer	Comedian Manager	Song Title	Original Singer	Lyrics	Composer	Arranger	Ranking	Singer Voting
1	Hacken Lee	Li Weijia	"醜八怪"	Joker Xue	甘世佳	Li Ronghao	Johnny Yim	6	—
2	Coco Lee	Shen Ling	"我真的受傷了"	Jacky Cheung	Ivana Wong		Lau Chi Yuen 符元偉	7	—
3	LaLa Hsu	Leo Li	"咕叽咕叽"	Stefanie Sun	Issac Chen	Lee Shih Shiong	Nick Pyo	4	—
4	Hwang Chi Yeul	Zhang Yu'an	"Honey" (Korean)	Park Jin-young			全相煥; Lukas 樸敏珠	1	—
Band show: 靳海音弦樂團
5	Joey Yung	Rolling Wang	"想著你的感覺"	Eric Moo	Liang Wern Fook		褚鎮東; Schumann	5	—
6	Jeff Chang	Shen Mengchen	"親愛的小孩"	Su Rui	楊立德	陳復明	Lau Chi Yuen; Jim Lee; PheBe Chou	2	1
7	Elvis Wang	Yan Wei	"親密愛人"	Anita Mui	Johnny Chen		羅俊轟 王淳	3	—

==== Overall ranking ====
I Am a Singer Season 4 3rd round overall ranking
Ranking	Singer	Match 1 Percentages of Votes (Ranking)	Match 2 Percentages of Votes (Ranking)	Total Percentages of Votes
1	Hwang Chi Yeul	14.88% (4)	23.36% (1)	19.12%
2	LaLa Hsu	17.22% (2)	16.26% (4) ^{[a]}	16.74%
3	Coco Lee	24.26% (1)	3.68% (7)	13.97%
4	Joey Yung	15.71% (3)	12.05% (5)	13.88%
5	Jeff Chang	8.89% (6)	17.13% (2)	13.01%
6	Hacken Lee	13.85% (5)	11.17% (6)	12.51%
7	Elvis Wang	5.16% (7)	16.33% (3)	10.74%

A. One vote less than 3rd.

==== Challenge (Ultimate Challenge Round) ====
- Taping Date: 3 March 2016
- Airdate: 11 March 2016

Kim Ji-Mun won the I Am a Singer- Who Will Challenge online spin-off competition and became the third and final challenger of the season; LaLa Hsu was initially eliminated for finishing last, however, Kim was unsuccessful in his challenge (placed 6th) and was eliminated instead.

I Am a Singer Season 4 3rd Challenge Round (Ultimate Challenge Round) 11 March 2016 Host: Hacken Lee
Order of Performance	Singer	Comedian Manager	Song Title	Original Singer	Lyrics	Composer	Arranger	Ranking	Sing Voting
1	Hacken Lee	Li Weijia	"可惜不是你"	Fish Leong	Francis Lee	曹軒賓	Chiu Tsang Hei	5	—
2	Hwang Chi Yeul	Zhang Yu'an	"你只是在比我高的地方" (Korean)	Shin Seung-hun			姜和成	4	—
3	Joey Yung	Rolling Wang	"煞科" (Cantonese)	Sammi Cheng	周禮茂; MC 仁	Joon-Young Choi	Nick Pyo	3	2
4	Coco Lee	Shen Ling	"Stay with Me" (English)	Sam Smith			唐達; Nick Pyo	2	1
5	Elvis Wang	Yan Wei	"Autumn Leaves" (English)	Yves Montand	Johnny Mercer	Joseph Kosma	梁子	Return Performance	
6	LaLa Hsu	Leo Li	"相愛後動物感傷"	A-mei	Issac Chen	Andrew Chen	Zheng Nan	7	—
Band show: Keyboard (達日丹)
7	Jeff Chang	Shen Mengchen	"平凡之路"	Pu Shu	Han Han; Pu Shu	Pu Shu	彭莒欣	1	—
7	Jeff Chang	Shen Mengchen	"See You Again" (English)	Wiz Khalifa	DJ Frank E Cameron Thomaz; Andrew Cedar; Phoebe Louise; Joshua Karl Simon; Hardy Dann Hume		彭莒欣	1	—
8	Kim Ji-Mun	Aaron Sun Pu	"往事只能回味"	尤雅 韓寶儀; Li Mao Shan; Zeng Lin	林煌坤	Liu Chia Chang	Kim Ji-Mun 關天天	6	3

===== Percentages of votes =====
I Am a Singer Season 4 3rd Challenge Round Percentages of votes
Ranking	Singer	Number of votes	Percentages of votes
1	Jeff Chang	339	23.15%
2	Coco Lee	332	22.67%
3	Joey Yung	243	16.59%
4	Hwang Chi Yeul	212	14.48%
5	Hacken Lee	162	11.06%
6	Kim Ji-Mun	102	6.96%
7	Lala Hsu	74	5.05%
Total valid votes		1464

=== 4th round ===
==== Qualifying (Ultimate Qualifying Round) ====
- Taping Date: 10 March 2016
- Airdate: 18 March 2016

Lao Lang was the third and final substitute singer of the season. The order of performance for this episode was determined through swiping their smartphones, with the singer picking the first smartphone getting to perform first. After the performance, the backup singer would randomly pick one singer to perform next and vice versa.

I Am a Singer Season 4 4th Qualifying Round (Ultimate Qualifying Round) 18 March 2016 Host: Hacken Lee
Order of Performance	Singer	Comedian Manager	Song Title	Original Singer	Lyrics	Composer	Arranger	Ranking	Sing Voting
1	Joey Yung	Rolling Wang	"突然想愛你"	Valen Hsu			Kubert Leung	7	2
2	LaLa Hsu	Leo Li	"浪費"	Yoga Lin	Chen Xin Yan	Zheng Nan		3	1 (Tie)
3	Hacken Lee	Li Weijia	"天梯" (Cantonese)	C AllStar	Wendy Chung	賴映彤	Johnny Yim	2	—
4	Hwang Chi Yeul	Zhang Yu'an	"改變自己"	Wang Leehom			全相煥; Lukas 白賢秀	1	3
Band show: Keyboard (楊陽)
5	Kim Ji-Mun	Aaron Sun Pu	"中國姑娘"	Kim Ji-mun	李映雪	Kim Ji-Mun	關天天	Return Performance	
6	Jeff Chang	Shen Mengchen	"記得"	A-mei	Kevin Yi	JJ Lin	Nick Pyo	4	—
7	Coco Lee	Shen Ling	"不潮不用花錢"	JJ Lin	林怡鳳	JJ Lin	Jae Chong	5	—
8	Lao Lang	Eliza Liang	"旅途"	Pu Shu			Lung Lung ^{[f]}	6	1 (Tie)

==== Knockout (Ultimate Knockout Round) ====
- Taping Date: 17 March 2016
- Airdate: 25 March 2016

Yung and Lao were originally going to perform 4th and 6th, respectively, but swapped by mutual agreement due to Yung's leg injury. Portions of Leslie Cheung's lyrics during Chang's performance were unaired due to Cheung's death anniversary on 1 April.

I Am a Singer Season 4 4th Knockout Round (Ultimate Knockout Round) 25 March 2016 Host: Hacken Lee
Order of Performance	Singer	Comedian Manager	Song Title	Original Singer	Lyrics	Composer	Arranger	Ranking	Sing Voting
1	Hwang Chi Yeul	Zhang Yu'an	"像中槍一樣" (Korean)	Baek Ji-young	KIM, TAE YOON	Hitman Bang	申勝義	4	—
2	Coco Lee	Shen Ling	"Bad Romance" (English)	Lady Gaga	Lady Gaga; RedOne		Starr Chen 廖偉傑	2	—
3	Jeff Chang	Shen Mengchen	"這麼遠那麼近" (Cantonese)	Anthony Wong	Wyman Wong	Leslie Cheung	Nick Pyo	6	—
4	Lao Lang	Eliza Liang	"冬季校園"	李曉東	Gao Xiaosong		Lung Lung	7	—
4	Lao Lang	Eliza Liang	"睡在我上鋪的兄弟"	Lao Lang	Gao Xiaosong		Lung Lung	7	—
5	LaLa Hsu	Leo Li	"一無所有"	Cui Jian			Zheng Nan	5	—
Band show: Wind Band (謝燕輝, Angu, Charlie, Ray)
6	Joey Yung	Rolling Wang	"Bad Boy" (Mandarin)	A-mei	Chang Yu Sheng		Nick Pyo	3	1
7	Hacken Lee	Li Weijia	"我不會唱歌" (Cantonese)	Hacken Lee	Wyman Wong	Edmond Tsang	Johnny Yim	1	2

==== Overall ranking ====
I Am a Singer Season 4 4th round overall ranking
Ranking	Singer	Match 1 Percentages of Votes (Ranking)	Match 2 Percentages of Votes (Ranking)	Total Percentages of Votes
1	Hwang Chi Yeul	26.72% (1)	17.37% (4)	22.05%
2	Hacken Lee	18.92% (2)	19.78% (1)	19.35%
3	Coco Lee	12.78% (5) ^{[b]}	19.25% (2)	16.01%
4	LaLa Hsu	13.40% (3)	12.94% (5)	13.17%
5	Joey Yung	5.45% (7)	18.51% (3)	11.98%
6	Jeff Chang	13.19% (4) ^{[a]}	7.85% (6)	10.52%
7	Lao Lang	9.53% (6)	4.29% (7)	6.91%

A. Three votes less than 3rd.
B. Six votes less than 4th.

=== Breakout ===
- Taping Date: 24 March 2016
- Airdate: 1 April 2016

Four of the six singers who were initial singers (Hsu, Hwang, Coco and Hacken) were exempt from this round, while the other two singers participated along with previously eliminated singers for a chance to enter the finals. The performance order was determined based on the contestant's status quo and their duration on the stage. All but four singers went through ballot to decide the order, while Chang and Yung selected their performance freely, while unsuccessful challengers (Su and Kim) were defaulted to the first two performances.

The singers sang one song, and the three singers with the most votes qualified for the finals. Chang, Yung and Lao were the top three singers who received the highest number of votes and advanced to the finals. In a final tally, Lao, Wang, Shin, Kim and Su were revealed to have garnered 142, 134, 100, 99 and 98 votes, respectively.

"我的天空", during Chang's performance as part of his medley, was edited out due to time constraints. This is currently the only episode to date in I Am a Singer where all participating contestants in the Breakout round doubled their roles as the hosts.

I Am a Singer Season 4 Breakout 1 April 2016 Host: Hacken Lee and all participating Breakout singers
Order of Performance	Singer	Comedian Manager	Song Title	Original Singer	Lyrics	Composer	Arranger	Ranking	Singer Voting
1	Kim Ji-Mun	Aaron Sun Pu	"美酒加咖啡"	Teresa Teng	林煌坤	Charles Tso	Kim Ji-Mun 關天天	7	—
2	Su Yunying	Wang Qiao	"知足"	Mayday	Ashin		Kubert Leung 達日丹	8	—
3	Chao Chuan	Li Rui	"曾經的你"	Xu Wei			Kenn C	5	—
4	Shin	Cindy	"花心"	Wakin Chau	厲曼婷	Shoukichi Kina	Joy	6	1
5	HAYA Band	Wayne Zhang	"英格瑪" (English/Mongolian)	Enigma			HAYA Band	9	2 (Tie)
6	Guan Zhe	Ryan	"悟空"	戴荃			關天天	10	—
7	Elvis Wang	Yan Wei	"再見，我的愛人"	Teresa Teng	文君	平尾昌晃森 岡賢一郎	Nick Pyo	4	—
8	Lao Lang	Eliza Liang	"虎口脫險"	Lao Lang	郁冬		Lung Lung	3	2 (Tie)
9	Joey Yung	Rolling Wang	"放開你的頭腦"	Anita Mui	陳煥昌	Johnny Chen; Jerry Lo	Nick Pyo	2	
10	Jeff Chang	Shen Mengchen	"致光陰" medley				Terence Teo	1	—
10	Jeff Chang	Shen Mengchen	"時間煮雨	Yisa Yu	Guo Jingming; Luo Luo	Satoshi Takebe	Terence Teo	1	—
10	Jeff Chang	Shen Mengchen	"時間都去哪兒了"	Reno Wang	董冬冬	陳曦	Terence Teo	1	—
10	Jeff Chang	Shen Mengchen	"滴答"	Kan Kan	高地		Terence Teo	1	—
10	Jeff Chang	Shen Mengchen	"那些年"	Hu Xia	Giddens Ko	木村充利	Terence Teo	1	—
10	Jeff Chang	Shen Mengchen	"小幸運"	Hebe Tien	Jennifer 吳輝福	JerryC	Terence Teo	1	—
10	Jeff Chang	Shen Mengchen	"青春修煉手冊"	TFBOYS	王韻韻	劉佳	Terence Teo	1	—
10	Jeff Chang	Shen Mengchen	"一次就好"	Aska Yang	陳曦	董冬冬	Terence Teo	1	—
10	Jeff Chang	Shen Mengchen	"我想大聲告訴你"	樊凡	樊凡 魏文超	魏文超	Terence Teo	1	—
10	Jeff Chang	Shen Mengchen	"信仰"	Jeff Chang	Kevin Yi Chan Yiu Chuen	Chan Yiu Chuen	Terence Teo	1	—

=== Final Round ===
- Airdate: 8 April 2016

The finals were divided into two rounds, with the first song being a duet with a guest singer, and the second song being a solo encore performance. Similar to the previous season, only combined votes determined the season's winner.

==== First round ====
The first round of the finals was a guest singer's duet. The order was determined through balloting. The singer who received the lowest number of votes after the first round was eliminated from the competition.

I Am a Singer Season 4 1st Final Round 8 April 2016 Host: He Jiong
Order of Performance	Singer	Comedian Manager	Help Singer	Song Title	Original Singer	Lyrics	Composer	Arranger	Ranking
1	Hwang Chi Yeul	Zhang Yu'an	Gummy	"You Are My Everything" (Korean)	Gummy	Roco 志勛	Gummy	姜和成	2
2	LaLa Hsu	Leo Li	JJ Lin	"不為誰而作的歌"	JJ Lin	Eric Lin	JJ Lin	Zheng Nan	6
3	Coco Lee	Shen Ling	Ne-Yo	"Earth Song" (English)	Michael Jackson			Kubert Leung	1
4	Lao Lang	Eliza Liang	Wang Feng; Zhou Xiao'ou; Ma Shangyou 欒樹 丁武 陳勁 李延亮 高旗	"禮物"	Xu Wei; Wang Feng; Zhou Xiao'ou; Ma Shangyou; Thomas Lee 陳勁 欒樹 丁武; Zhang Chu 李延亮 高旗	梁芒 欒樹	欒樹	Lung Lung	4
5	Joey Yung	Rolling Wang	William Chan	"加大力度"	Joey Yung	Chan Wing Him	Carl Wong	Nick Pyo	7
6	Hacken Lee	Li Weijia	George Lam; Sally Yeh	"左林右莉走一回" medley				Johnny Yim	5
6	Hacken Lee	Li Weijia	George Lam; Sally Yeh	"瀟洒走一回"	Sally Yeh	Lo-Jung Chen; Wang Hui Ling	陳大力 陳秀男	Johnny Yim	5
6	Hacken Lee	Li Weijia	George Lam; Sally Yeh	"阿Lam日記" (Cantonese)	George Lam	George Lam	E Garcia	Johnny Yim	5
6	Hacken Lee	Li Weijia	George Lam; Sally Yeh	"數字人生" (Cantonese)	George Lam	Poon Yuen Leung	Denny Randell; Sandy Lizer	Johnny Yim	5
7	Jeff Chang	Shen Mengchen	Akon	"狂潮" medley				Suby 三桂	3
7	Jeff Chang	Shen Mengchen	Akon	"愛如潮水" (Mandarin)	Jeff Chang	Jonathan Lee	Li Feihui	Suby 三桂	3
7	Jeff Chang	Shen Mengchen	Akon	"Mr. Lonely" (English)	Akon	Akon; Gene Allan; Bobby Vinton	Akon; Bobby Vinton	Suby 三桂	3

==== Second round ====
The order of performance of this round was determined by the "First and Last" duel sequence based on the results of the first round, with the order being: 3rd, 4th, 2nd, 5th, 1st and 6th.

I Am a Singer Season 4 2nd Final Round 8 April 2016 Host: He Jiong
Order of Performance	Singer	Comedian Manager	Song Title	Original Singer	Lyrics	Composer	Arranger	Final Results
1	Lao Lang	Eliza Liang	"米店"	Zhang Weiwei			Lung Lung	—
2	Jeff Chang	Shen Mengchen	"天空之城"	Azumi Inoue	何啟弘	Joe Hisaishi	Baby Chung	2
3	Hacken Lee	Li Weijia	"愛是永恆" (Cantonese)	Jacky Cheung	Richard Lam	Dick Lee	Johnny Yim	—
4	Hwang Chi Yeul	Zhang Yu'an	"王妃"	Jam Hsiao	Issac Chen	Lee Shih Shiong	Denis Seo	3
5	LaLa Hsu	Leo Li	"突然好想你"	Mayday	Ashin		Zheng Nan	—
6	Coco Lee	Shen Ling	"月光愛人"	Coco Lee	Yee Kar Yeung	Tan Dun	Xu Ming	1
7	Joey Yung	Rolling Wang	"這麼近那麼遠"	Jacky Cheung	Wyman Wong	Jacky Cheung	Alex Fung	Return Performance
8	Yu Quan; Han Lei; Han Hong	–	"給所有知道我名字的人"	Chao Chuan	Jonathan Lee	Liu Tianjian	Rama Liu	Winners-only Exhibition Performance

==== Overall results (Winner of Battle) ====
Before the final results were announced, the host named Chang, Hwang and Coco as the "Ultimate Winner Candidates". Coco was declared the winner with 53.29% of the votes, beating Chang's 25.75% and Hwang's 20.96% of the votes cast. The percentages reflected in the table counted only the votes of the three aforementioned singers.

I Am a Singer Season 4 Ranking of Winner of Battle
Ranking	Singer	Total Percentages of Votes
1	Coco Lee	53.29%
2	Jeff Chang	25.75%
3	Hwang Chi Yeul	20.96%

=== Biennial Concert ===
- Airdate: 15 April 2016

The concert featured singers from the third and fourth series, which include Han Hong, Li Jian, The One, Sitar Tan, Tiger Hu and A-Lin from Season 3, as well as Season 4 finalists Coco Lee, Jeff Chang, Hwang Chi Yeul, Hacken Lee, Joey Yung, LaLa Hsu and Lao Lang.

I Am a Singer Season 4 Biennial Concert 15 April 15, 2016
Group of Performance	Order of Performance	Singer	Song Title	Original Singer	Lyrics	Composer	Arranger
I	1	Sitar Tan	"青春舞曲"	Uyghurs folk song	Wang Luobin		Rama Liu
I	2	Lao Lang	"純真年代"	Ye Pei	郁冬		Lung Lung
II	3	Hacken Lee; Joey Yung	"克不容緩" medley				Harris Ho
II	3	Hacken Lee; Joey Yung	"逃" (Cantonese)	Joey Yung	Wyman Wong	Hanjin Tan	Harris Ho
II	3	Hacken Lee; Joey Yung	"嘭門" (Cantonese)	Hacken Lee	Wyman Wong	Keith Chan Fai-young	Harris Ho
II	3	Hacken Lee; Joey Yung	"說好的幸福呢"	Jay Chou	Vincent Fang	Jay Chou	Harris Ho
II	4	Tiger Hu	"鴿子"	Song Dongye			Tiger Hu; Jason Gu
III	5	The One	"愛是永恆"	Jacky Cheung	Richard Lam	Dick Lee	Kim Hyung Kyu; Jeon Da Woon; Kwon Suk Hong
III	6	LaLa Hsu	"鲁冰花"	Tseng Shu Ching	Yao Chien	Chen Yang	Zheng Nan
IV	7	Jeff Chang	"I Believe"	Van Fan	Aguai Wu	Kim Hyung Seok	Baby Chung
IV	8	A-Lin	"我們都寂寞"	Eason Chan	Lin Xi	Adrian Fu	Roger Yo
V	9	Li Jian	"Feeling Good" (English)	Cy Grant	Anthony Newley; Leslie Bricusse	Anthony Newley; Leslie Bricusse	Zhao Zhao
V	10	Hwang Chi Yeul	"青蘋果樂園"	Xiao Hu Dui	Hsiao-Wen Ting	Jimmy Johnson	Shinsadong Tiger
V	10	Hwang Chi Yeul	"對你愛不完"	Aaron Kwok	Lo-Jung Chen	Ichiro Hada	Shinsadong Tiger
VI	11	Coco Lee	"I Will Survive" (English)	Gloria Gaynor	Freddie Perren; Dino Fekaris		Mickey Lin; Liao Wei Jie
VI	11	Coco Lee	"Survivor" (English)	Destiny's Child	Beyoncé Knowles; Anthony Dent; Mathew Knowles		Mickey Lin; Liao Wei Jie
VI	11	Coco Lee	"Run the World (Girls)" (English)	Beyoncé Knowles	Terius Youngdell Nash; Beyoncé Knowles; Wesley Pentz; David Taylor; Adidja Palmer; Nick van de Wall		Mickey Lin; Liao Wei Jie
VI	12	Han Hong	"If You" (Korean)	BigBang	G-Dragon	G-Dragon; P.K; Dee.P	Kubert Leung; Da Ridan
