= Daichin Tana =

Chinese Mongol singer

- Born: August 29, 1983 (age 43); Delhi, Haixi, Qinghai, China
- Genres: Folk music World music
- Years active: 2006–present
- Label: Wind Music
- Member of: HAYA

Daichin Tana

Chinese name
- Traditional Chinese: 黛青塔娜
- Simplified Chinese: 黛青塔娜
Transcriptions
Standard Mandarin
- Hanyu Pinyin: Dàiqīng tǎnà
- Bopomofo: ㄉㄞˋ ㄑㄧㄥ ㄊㄚˇ ㄋㄚˋ
- Wade–Giles: Tai^{4}ch'ing^{1} T'a^{3}na^{4}

Mongolian name
- Mongolian Cyrillic: Дайчинтана
- Mongolian script: ᠲᠠᠢᠴᠢᠨ ᠲᠠᠯ᠎ᠠ

Daichin Tana is an ethnic Mongol singer-songwriter from Qinghai, China. She is the lead singer of the band HAYA.

== Early life ==
Daichin Tana's mother was well known locally as a Mongol folk musician; she supported Daichin Tana's interest in music from a young age. Daichin Tana studied vocal performance at Minzu University of China in Beijing.

== Career ==
Daichin Tana joined the band HAYA (Mongolian: ᠬᠠᠶᠠᠭ᠎ᠠ; Mongolian: Хаяа; 'sometimes' simplified Chinese: 哈雅乐团; traditional Chinese: 哈雅樂團; pinyin: hāyǎ yuètuán 'band Haya') in 2006. The band produces world music, using Mongolian folk music as its basis.

Daichin Tana provided the lead vocals for HAYA's first album, Wolf Totem, released in 2008. Their second album Silent Sky was released in 2009 with the label Wind Music. A special edition LP vinyl was released in 2015. In 2011, Daichin Tana released another album with HAYA, titled Migration. HAYA released another album in 2014 called Crazy Horse.

In 2016, Daichin Tana and HAYA participated in the fourth season of the musical talent show I Am a Singer. They were eliminated in the first round on 22 January.

== Personal life ==
In June 2013, Daichin Tana married bandmate and founder of HAYA Zhang Quansheng (Chinese: 张全胜).

== Discography ==
=== HAYA ===
- Wolf Totem (Chinese: 狼圖騰) (2008)
- Silent Sky (Chinese: 寂静的天空) (2009)
- Migration (Chinese: 迁徙) (2011)
- Crazy Horse (Chinese: 疯马) (2014)
- Silent Sky (Special Edition LP) (2015)
- Link (2019)
