= Elvis Wang =

Chinese pop bass singer

Wang Xi
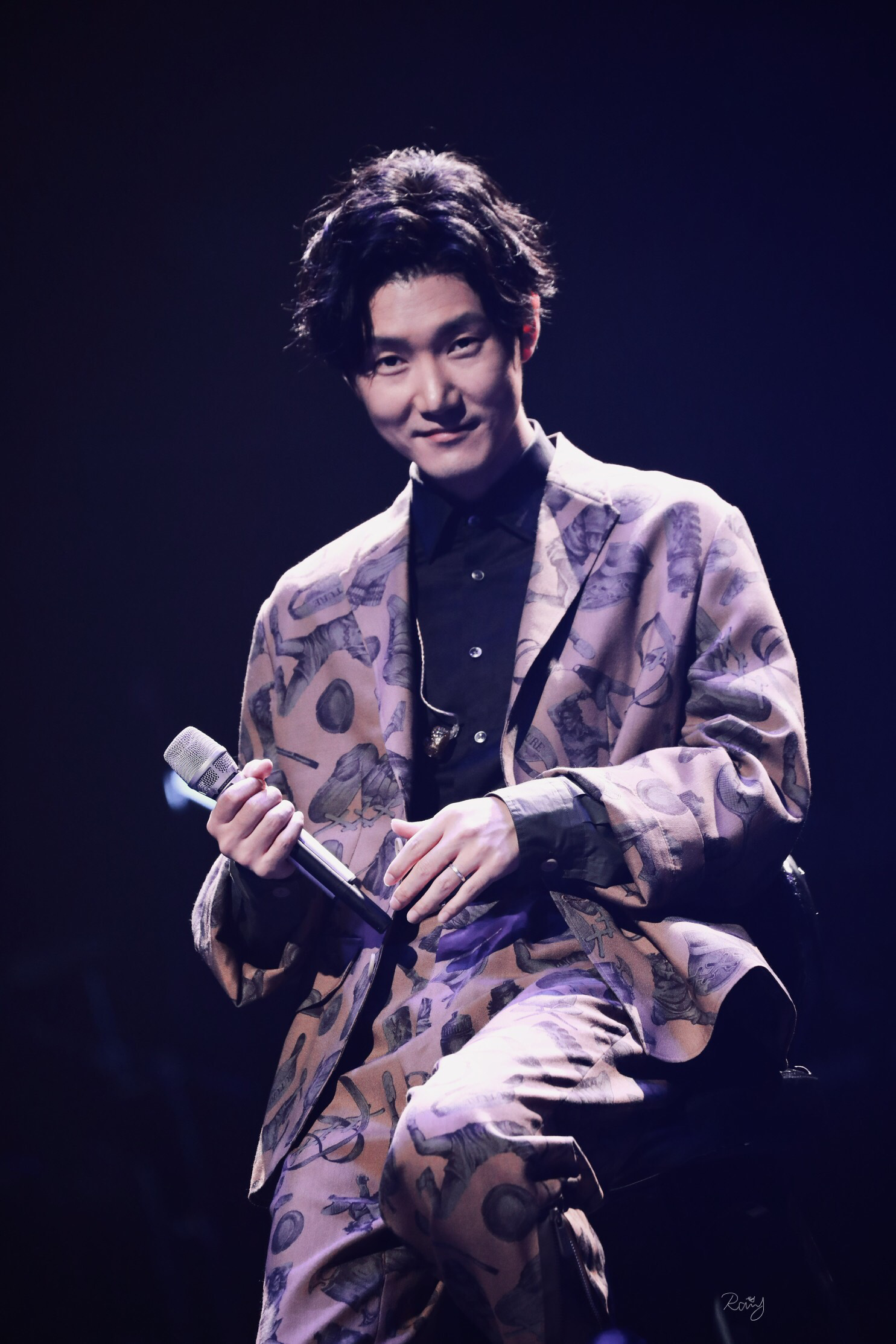
- Wang in 2019
- Chinese: 王晰
Transcriptions
Standard Mandarin
- Hanyu Pinyin: Wáng Xī

Birth name
- Chinese: 王欣
Transcriptions
Standard Mandarin
- Hanyu Pinyin: Wáng Xīn

Wang Xi (born Wang Xin; 9 April 1985), known professionally as Elvis Wang, is a Chinese pop bass singer from Yingkou, Liaoning. He represented China at the Intervision 2025 with the song "Zài lùshàng" finishing in 9th place with 328 points.

He graduated from Liaoning Arts Vocational College with a major in pop singing and then studied at the Shenyang Conservatory of Music. He is also a youth singer of the Chinese People's Liberation Army Naval Political Department and a member of the Chinese Musicians Association.

In 2011, he participated in the "8th China Music Golden Bell Awards Pop Music Competition" and won the men's gold award. In 2013, he participated in the CCTV's "15th National Youth Singer TV Grand Prix" and won the popular singing championship. In the same year, he won the 2014 Top Ten Hot Record Award for his first album, The Temptation of Low C. In 2015, he kicked off his first concert tour in Zhuhai. In 2016, he participated in season 4 of I Am a Singer and won the first round, but he was eliminated in the third round. He became the first singer to sing a Spanish song in the history of the show. In 2018, he participated in Super-Vocal. He represented China in Intervision 2025.

== Career ==
At the age of 15, Wang learned vocal music from Han Song, a teacher at the Opera School. In 2004, Wang was admitted to the popular singing major of Liaoning Art Vocational College.

In 2007, he participated in the HBS competition show Super Boy and won the top four in Guangzhou region and the top 24 in the country. He also released his first single in the same year. In January 2008, he participated in the show "Unparalleled in the World". In April, he was invited to participate in Sichuan TV's "King of Kings" program, and sang the single Blue Cello; on 15 November, he released the single Blue Cello.

In 2009, he acted in the drama Grandkeeper, which was his first TV series. In March 2011, he released the singles such as Chongqing Wild Rose and Friends in the Streets Are Lonely and participated in the "8th China Golden Bell Awards Pop Music Competition" by Shenzhen Satellite TV, and finally won the men's gold medal; that same year, Wang joined the Chinese Musicians Association, and was admitted to the People's Liberation Army Navy Politics Group. He asked Ku Feng for help and devoted himself to learning pop music. In the same year, on 6 November, he was interviewed for a show on BTV.

On 26 March 2012, he sang at the welcoming of Irish Prime Minister Enda Kenny by Xi Jinping at the Diaoyutai State Guesthouse. In 2013, he participated in the "15th National Youth Singer TV Grand Prix" of CCTV, and advanced to the national competition as first place in Henan Division, and then won the popular competition. In March 2014, he participated in the recording of the theme song Spring for the 10th anniversary of the CCTV music channel.

On 19 September 2014, his first album Low C's Temptation was released, including 13 songs including When Love Has Been Things and At least You, and won the "10th whole army performance" vocal music award. On 14 December, he won the "2014 Top Ten Hot Record Awards" at the 10th "Top Ten Album Awards Ceremony" with the album Low C's Temptation.

On 27 June 2015, his first national tour concert was held in Zhuhai. On 27 January 2016, at the banquet of the "People's Navy Spirit", Wang premiered and sang the original song Soldier Talk by the writer Feng Xiaobin and the songwriter Wang Jie. On 10 February, he participated season 4 of I Am a Singer and won the first round.

== Discography ==
=== Soundtrack appearances ===
Title	Singer	Notes	Ref.
"Born at the Right Time"	Elvis Wang	New Generation: Because I Have A Home OST	
