= 1993 US Open – Men's doubles =

Men's doubles
- 1993 US Open

Final
- Champion: (United States) Ken Flach (United States) Rick Leach
- Runner-up: (Czech Republic) Karel Nováček (Czech Republic) Martin Damm
- Score: 6–7^{(3–7)}, 6–4, 6–2

Details
- Draw: 64
- Seeds: 16

Events
Singles	men	women		boys	girls
Doubles	men	women	mixed	boys	girls
WC Singles	men	women	quad
WC Doubles	men	women	quad
Legends	men	women	mixed
- US Open

The men's doubles tournament at the 1993 US Open was held from August 30 to September 12, 1993, on the outdoor hard courts at the USTA National Tennis Center in New York City, United States. Ken Flach and Rick Leach won the title, defeating Karel Nováček and Martin Damm in the final.

This was the first US Open edition to play best-of-three sets matches in all rounds. Until 1992 from the quarterfinals onwards men's doubles were played best-of-five sets.

== Seeds ==
1. (Australia) Todd Woodbridge / (Australia) Mark Woodforde (third round)
2. (United States) Patrick McEnroe / (United States) Richey Reneberg (third round)
3. (Canada) Grant Connell / (United States) Patrick Galbraith (second round)
4. (Netherlands) Jacco Eltingh / (Netherlands) Paul Haarhuis (second round)
5. (Australia) Mark Kratzmann / (Australia) Wally Masur (second round)
6. (Netherlands) Tom Nijssen / (Czech Republic) Cyril Suk (third round)
7. (United States) Luke Jensen / (United States) Murphy Jensen (second round)
8. (Spain) Sergio Casal / (Spain) Emilio Sánchez (first round)
9. (United States) Steve DeVries / (Australia) David Macpherson (second round)
10. (United States) Jared Palmer / (United States) Jonathan Stark (first round)
11. (South Africa) Danie Visser / (Australia) Laurie Warder (first round)
12. (United States) Ken Flach / (United States) Rick Leach (champions)
13. (Canada) Glenn Michibata / (United States) David Pate (first round)
14. (United States) Shelby Cannon / (United States) Scott Melville (first round)
15. (South Africa) David Adams / (Russia) Andrei Olhovskiy (semifinals)
16. (Netherlands) Hendrik-Jan Davids / (South Africa) Piet Norval (second round)

== Draw ==
Key

- Q = Qualifier
- WC = Wild card
- LL = Lucky loser
- Alt = Alternate
- ITF = ITF entry
- PR = Protected ranking
- SR = Special ranking
- SE = Special exempt
- JE = Junior exempt
- JR = Junior Accelerator Programme entrant
- CO = College Accelerator Programme entrant
- NG = Next Gen Accelerator Program entrant
- w/o = Walkover
- r = Retired
- d = Defaulted

=== Finals ===
Quarterfinals
15	(South Africa) David Adams (Russia) Andrei Olhovskiy	7	6
(United States) Brad Pearce (United States) Dave Randall	6	2
(Sweden) Jonas Björkman (Australia) Pat Rafter	6	2
12	(United States) Ken Flach (United States) Rick Leach	7	6
(Canada) Sebastien Lareau (India) Leander Paes	5	6	6
WC	(United States) Matt Lucena (United States) Brian MacPhie	7	2	2
(Czech Republic) Martin Damm (Czech Republic) Karel Nováček	6	6	6
(Italy) Diego Nargiso (Spain) Javier Sánchez	2	7	3

Semifinals
15	(South Africa) David Adams (Russia) Andrei Olhovskiy	7	4	5
12	(United States) Ken Flach (United States) Rick Leach	6	6	7
(Canada) Sebastien Lareau (India) Leander Paes	6	1	4
(Czech Republic) Martin Damm (Czech Republic) Karel Nováček	3	6	6

Final
12	(United States) Ken Flach (United States) Rick Leach	6^{3}	6	6
(Czech Republic) Martin Damm (Czech Republic) Karel Nováček	7	4	2

=== Top half ===
==== Section 1 ====
First round
1	(Australia) T Woodbridge (Australia) M Woodforde	6	6
(France) O Delaître (France) JP Fleurian	3	3
(United States) P Annacone (United States) D Wheaton	1	6	7
(Netherlands) M Oosting (Czech Republic) D Vacek	6	3	5
(South Africa) JL de Jager (South Africa) M Ondruska	4	4
(Sweden) P Nyborg (Norway) BO Pedersen	6	6
(The Bahamas) M Knowles (United States) T Martin	6	3
15	(South Africa) D Adams (Russia) A Olhovskiy	7	6
10	(United States) J Palmer (United States) J Stark	4	4
(Germany) MC Goellner (Germany) D Prinosil	6	6
(Argentina) P Albano (Australia) N Borwick	6	3
(United States) B Pearce (United States) D Randall	7	6
(Sweden) J Donar (Sweden) O Jonsson	6	5	3
WC	(United States) D Flach (United States) D Witt	2	7	6
(Australia) J Fitzgerald (Switzerland) J Hlasek	4	6	4
7	(United States) L Jensen (United States) M Jensen	6	2	6

Second round
1	(Australia) T Woodbridge (Australia) M Woodforde	6	7	6
(United States) P Annacone (United States) D Wheaton	7	5	4
(Sweden) P Nyborg (Norway) BO Pedersen	5	6
15	(South Africa) D Adams (Russia) A Olhovskiy	7	7
(Germany) MC Goellner (Germany) D Prinosil	3	5
(United States) B Pearce (United States) D Randall	6	7
WC	(United States) D Flach (United States) D Witt	6	7
7	(United States) L Jensen (United States) M Jensen	4	5

Third round
1	(Australia) T Woodbridge (Australia) M Woodforde	2	6
15	(South Africa) D Adams (Russia) A Olhovskiy	6	7
(United States) B Pearce (United States) D Randall	7	6
WC	(United States) D Flach (United States) D Witt	6	3

Quarterfinals
15	(South Africa) D Adams (Russia) A Olhovskiy	7	6
(United States) B Pearce (United States) D Randall	6	2

==== Section 2 ====
First round
3	(Canada) G Connell (United States) P Galbraith	7	6
(United States) F Montana (United States) G Van Emburgh	6	2
(United States) S Davis (South Africa) C van Rensburg	7	3	6
(Netherlands) S Groen (Netherlands) J Siemerink	5	6	1
(Sweden) J Björkman (Australia) P Rafter	4	6	6
(Portugal) J Cunha e Silva (Venezuela) M Ruah	6	3	3
(United States) M Briggs (United States) T Kronemann	6	6	6
13	(Canada) G Michibata (United States) D Pate	7	4	4
12	(United States) K Flach (United States) R Leach	7	6
WC	(United States) B Dunn (United States) V Spadea	5	0
(South Africa) M Barnard (United States) T Mercer	3	7	7
(United Kingdom) N Broad (South Africa) G Muller	6	6	6
(Brazil) J Oncins (Venezuela) N Pereira	4	4
(United States) K Jones (Mexico) J Lozano	6	6
(Sweden) R Bergh (South Africa) B Talbot	3	4
5	(Australia) M Kratzmann (Australia) W Masur	6	6

Second round
3	(Canada) G Connell (United States) P Galbraith	4	6
(United States) S Davis (South Africa) C van Rensburg	6	7
(Sweden) J Björkman (Australia) P Rafter	7	7
(United States) M Briggs (United States) T Kronemann	5	6
12	(United States) K Flach (United States) R Leach	7	6
(South Africa) M Barnard (United States) T Mercer	5	1
(United States) K Jones (Mexico) J Lozano	7	7
5	(Australia) M Kratzmann (Australia) W Masur	5	6

Third round
(United States) S Davis (South Africa) C van Rensburg	7	3	2
(Sweden) J Björkman (Australia) P Rafter	6	6	6
12	(United States) K Flach (United States) R Leach	6	6
(United States) K Jones (Mexico) J Lozano	3	4

Quarterfinals
(Sweden) J Björkman (Australia) P Rafter	6	2
12	(United States) K Flach (United States) R Leach	7	6

=== Bottom half ===
==== Section 3 ====
First round
6	(Netherlands) T Nijssen (Czech Republic) C Suk	6	6	7
(South Africa) B Haygarth (United States) J Pugh	7	4	6
(Zimbabwe) B Black (New Zealand) B Steven	6	6
WC	(United States) T Ho (United States) C Woodruff	0	3
WC	(United States) E Lin (United States) G Weiner	4	2
(Canada) S Lareau (India) L Paes	6	6
(United States) M Keil (South Africa) S Kruger	6	7
11	(South Africa) M Edmondson (Australia) S Stewart	4	6
14	(United States) S Cannon (United States) S Melville	4	4
(United States) B Shelton (United States) T Witsken	6	6
(United States) K Kinnear (United States) S Salumaa	6	6
(United States) M Lucena (United States) B Macphie	7	7
(South Africa) W Ferreira (Germany) M Stich	3	6	6
(Sweden) H Holm (Sweden) N Holm	6	4	4
(South Africa) R Deppe (Czech Republic) D Rikl	3	3
4	(Netherlands) J Eltingh (Netherlands) P Haarhuis	6	6

Second round
6	(Netherlands) T Nijssen (Czech Republic) C Suk	6	6
(Zimbabwe) B Black (New Zealand) B Steven	3	2
(Canada) S Lareau (India) L Paes	6	6
12	(United States) M Keil (South Africa) S Kruger	4	2
(United States) B Shelton (United States) T Witsken	6	6	6
WC	(United States) M Lucena (United States) B Macphie	7	3	7
(South Africa) W Ferreira (Germany) M Stich	3	6	6
4	(Netherlands) J Eltingh (Netherlands) P Haarhuis	6	4	3

Third round
6	(Netherlands) T Nijssen (Czech Republic) C Suk	3	6	1
(Canada) S Lareau (India) L Paes	6	1	6
WC	(United States) M Lucena (United States) B Macphie	6	6
(South Africa) W Ferreira (Germany) M Stich	1	2

Quarterfinals
(Canada) S Lareau (India) L Paes	5	6	6
WC	(United States) M Lucena (United States) B Macphie	7	2	2

==== Section 4 ====
First round
8	(Spain) S Casal (Spain) E Sánchez	6	1
(United States) D Eisenman (United States) D Johnson	7	6
(Croatia) G Ivanišević (Switzerland) M Rosset	6	6
WC	(United States) I Baron (United States) M Joyce	4	2
(Czech Republic) M Damm (Czech Republic) K Nováček	7	4	7
(Australia) S Stolle (Australia) J Stoltenberg	6	6	5
(United States) B Garnett (United States) TJ Middleton	5	6	1
9	(United States) S DeVries (Australia) D Macpherson	7	4	6
16	(Netherlands) HJ Davids (South Africa) P Norval	6	7
(Italy) C Brandi (South Africa) J de Beer	4	6
(Italy) D Nargiso (Spain) J Sánchez	6	6	7
(Spain) T Carbonell (Czech Republic) L Pimek	7	3	6
WC	(United States) D Blair (United States) M Merklein	6	7
(Sweden) R Båthman (Denmark) M Mortensen	3	6
(United States) B Devening (United States) A O'Brien	3	3
2	(United States) P McEnroe (United States) R Reneberg	6	6

Second round
WC	(United States) D Eisenman (United States) D Johnson	w/o
(Croatia) G Ivanišević (Switzerland) M Rosset
(Czech Republic) M Damm (Czech Republic) K Nováček	6	6	7
9	(United States) S DeVries (Australia) D Macpherson	2	7	6
16	(Netherlands) HJ Davids (South Africa) P Norval	4	6
(Italy) D Nargiso (Spain) J Sánchez	6	7
WC	(United States) D Blair (United States) M Merklein	1	4
2	(United States) P McEnroe (United States) R Reneberg	6	6

Third round
WC	(United States) D Eisenman (United States) D Johnson	6	3
(Czech Republic) M Damm (Czech Republic) K Nováček	7	6
(Italy) D Nargiso (Spain) J Sánchez	7	4	6
2	(United States) P McEnroe (United States) R Reneberg	6	6	3

Quarterfinals
(Czech Republic) M Damm (Czech Republic) K Nováček	6	6	6
(Italy) D Nargiso (Spain) J Sánchez	2	7	3
