= HAYA =

Mongol music band from China

- Origin: China
- Genres: New-age
- Years active: 2006–present
- Label: Wind Music
- Members: Daichin Tana; Zhang Quansheng; Chen Xibo; Mugelal; Baoyin; Eric Lattanzio

Chinese name
- Traditional Chinese: HAYA樂團
Transcriptions
Standard Mandarin
- Hanyu Pinyin: Hāyǎ Yuètuán

HAYA (Chinese: 哈雅樂團; pinyin: Hāyǎ Yuètuán; stylized as HAΨA) is a Chinese band. Founded in 2006, they integrate Mongolian music with modern pop music elements.

== History ==
Formed in 2006, HAYA released their debut album Wolf Totem in December 2007. The album won the "Best Cross-Border Music Album Award" at the 19th Golden Melody Awards.

In 2009, they released their second album Silent Sky, which was nominated for "Best Cross-Border Music Album Award" at the 21st Golden Melody Awards. On May 14, 2010, at the 10th Chinese Music Media Awards, lead singer Daichin Tana was awarded the “Best Ethnic Music Artist Award”. On July 8 of the same year, their charity album Lamp was released for disaster relief of the 2010 Yushu earthquake. On September 2, Daichin Tana won the "Best Ethnic Music Artist Award" at the Chinese Music Awards.

On September 28, 2011, they released their fourth album Migration. On December 31, they performed the "HAYA New Year Migration Concert" at the Tianqiao Theater in Beijing, where they recorded their first live concert DVD and CD set..

On February 5, 2012, they participated in the New Year's Gala Performance of the Chinese Musicians' Association. On March 5, they participated in the Art Power Awards. On June 4, Migration won the "Best Cross-Border Music Album Award" at the 23rd Golden Melody Awards. On December 22, they performed their 6th anniversary concert in Beijing, where they

On March 27, 2013, HAYA was awarded the "2013 Extraordinary Fashion People" Award. From May to July, they participated in and produced the "CCTV Competition for the Minority Singing Heroes". On August 5, they participated in the "Golden Bell Award" performance of the Chinese Musicians Association in Ordos.

On March 2, 2014, they participated in the Golden Bell Awards China Super Super Finals and won the gold medal in the group competition. In October, they won the annual championship on Guizhou Satellite TV's reality competition show Let the World Hear. On November 26, their fifth album Crazy Horse was released. On December 20, they performed Crazy Horse at the Beijing Ethnic Theatre.

On January 1, 2015, they were invited to participate in the Guangxi Satellite TV New Year's Festival. On June 24, they won the Best Orchestra Award, Best Leading Singer Award, and the Top Ten Golden Melody Awards of the Year at the 8th Singapore Golden Melody Awards Freshmusic. On August 1, the HAYA Orchestra won the Best Crossover Music Album Award at the 26th Golden Melody Awards with their 5th album Crazy Horse. On December 16, they won the Best World Music Album Award, Best Arrangement Award, and Best Recording Award at the "16th Chinese Music Media Awards".

On January 7, 2016, the joined Hunan Satellite TV's I Am a Singer in the fourth season.

== Members ==
HAYA currently consists of six members:

- Daichin Tana – lead vocals
- Zhang Quansheng – morin khuur guitarist
- Chen Xibo – guitar
- Mugelal – guitar
- Baoyin – drums, khöömei (throat singing)
- Eric Lattanzio – bass

== Name ==
Haya means "edge" in Mongolian.

== Discography ==
=== Studio albums ===
- Wolf Totem (狼圖騰; 2007)
- Silent Sky (寂靜的天空; 2009)
- Lamp (燈; 2010)
- Migration (遷徙; 2011)
- Crazy Horse (瘋馬; 2014)
- Link (Link; 2019)

=== Live albums ===
- HAYA Live in Beijing (HAYA樂團北京現場音樂會; 2011)

== Awards ==
=== Golden Melody Awards ===
Year	Ceremony	Category	Nominated work	Result	Ref
2008	19th	Best Cross-Border Music Album Award	Wolf Totem	Won	
2010	21st	Best Cross-Border Music Album Award	Silent Sky	Nominated	
2012	23rd	Best Cross-Border Music Album Award	Migration	Won	
2015	26th	Best Cross-Border Music Album Award	Crazy Horse	Won	
