= Leo Li =

- Chinese: 李莎旻子
- Hanyu Pinyin: Lǐ Shāmínzǐ
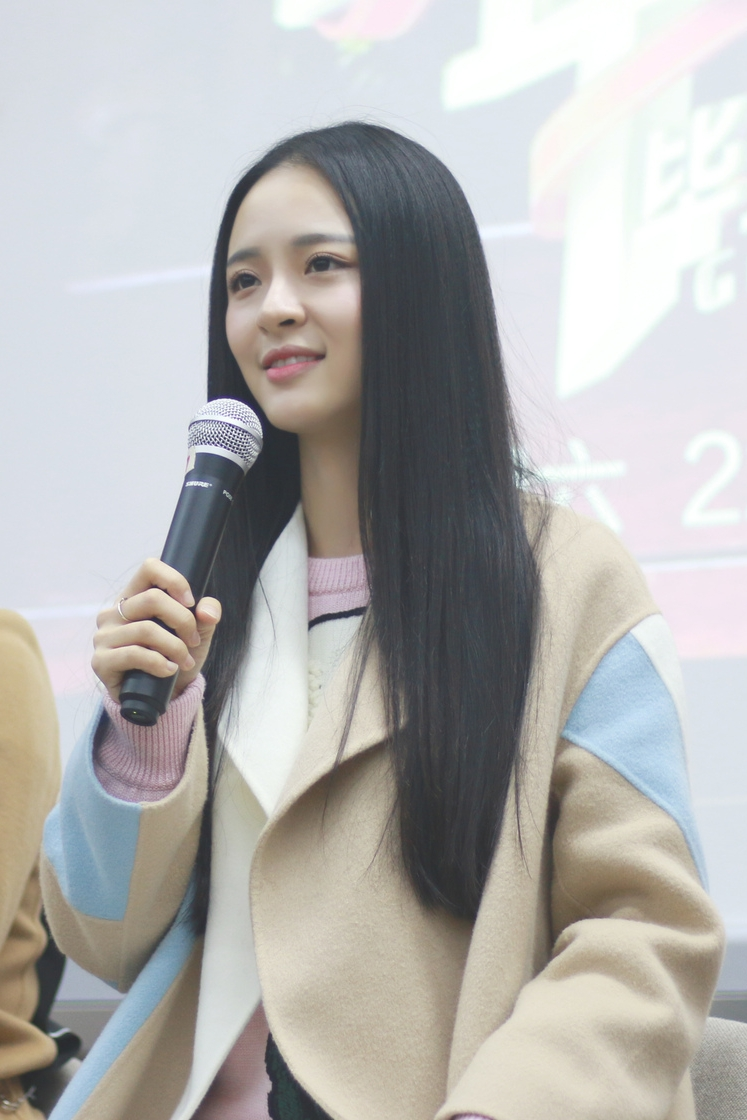
- Li during a press conference in Wuhan, 2016
- Born: 27 July 1993 (age 33); Changsha, Hunan, China
- Education: Yali High School; Wuhan University
- Occupations: Actress; singer-songwriter; television presenter
- Years active: 2013–present
- Parent(s): Li Geng (father); Quan Jixue (mother)
- Musical career
- Also known as: Lisa
- Genres: Mandopop
- Label: EE-Media

Leo Li (Chinese: 李莎旻子; pinyin: Lǐ Shāmínzǐ; born 27 July 1993) is a Chinese actress, singer-songwriter and television presenter. She is famous for her photo album with her alma mater — Yali, I Will Marry You Today (Chinese: 雅礼，今天我要嫁给你了) in 2013.

== Biography ==
Li was born to an ethnic Tujia family in Changsha, Hunan province in 1993. After graduation from Yali High School, she entered into Wuhan University and graduated in 2015. While a student at Wuhan University, she published her photo album with her alma mater - Yali, I Will Marry You Today. Since its release in 2013, it has become famous quickly on the Internet. In 2015, she joined Hunan Broadcasting System and became a television presenter. In 2016, she recorded her first single "Little Shrimp" (Chinese: 小虾). It was released on July 27, 2017. In 2017, she starred her first TV drama Kiss Love and Taste (Chinese: 亲·爱的味道) and started her acting career. Later she acted her first film Fantasy Metamorphoses (Chinese: 奇幻变型记).

== Filmography ==
=== Films ===
| Year | English Title | Chinese Title | Role | Notes |
|---|---|---|---|---|
| 2018 | Goal! Girls | 进击吧，少女！ | Qi Keran | Web film |
| 2022 | The Legend of Dugu: Additional Chapter I | 独孤天下之异瞳 | Liu Lihua | Web film |
| TBA | Fantasy Metamorphoses | 奇幻变型记 | Lu Qi | |

=== Micro films ===
| Year | English Title | Chinese Title | Role | Notes |
|---|---|---|---|---|
| 2015 | Let the Love Breath | 让爱呼吸 | Lin Xiaoxi | |
| 2015 | Goodbye, Innocence | 再见吧，纯真 | Li Shuwen | |

=== Television series ===
| Year | English Title | Chinese Title | Role | Network | Notes |
|---|---|---|---|---|---|
| 2017 | General and I | 孤芳不自赏 | Miss Hua | HBS: Hunan Television | Cameo |
| 2017 | The Flowers Filled the Palace and Missed the Time | 花落宫廷错流年 | Nian Shuyuan | Tencent Video | Web series |
| 2019 | Kiss Love and Taste | 亲·爱的味道 | Li Feilin | JSBC: Jiangsu Television | |
| 2019 | When Shui Met Mo – A Love Story | 水墨人生 | Cheng Dongning | iQiyi | Web series |
| 2020 | Love is All | 师爷请自重 | Jiang Muchun | Youku | Web series |
| 2021 | Make My Heart Smile | 扑通扑通喜欢你 | Lu Yao | iQiyi | Web series |
| 2021 | Faith Makes Great | 理想照耀中国 | Liu Jiao | HBS: Hunan Television | |
| 2022 | Dream Chaser League | 追梦者联盟 | Ning Jixin | GRT: Guangdong Television | |
| TBA | Through the Crowd to Hug You | 穿越人海拥抱你 | Cheng Manman | | |

=== As host ===
| Year | English Title | Chinese Title | Network | Notes |
|---|---|---|---|---|
| 2013 | Happy 3+1 | 开心3+1 | HMG: Hubei ETV | Guest appearance From July until October |
| 2013 | Who's Still Standing? | 一站到底 | JSBC: Jiangsu Television | Acting; From November 2013 until July 2014 |
| 2013 | ETV Team Buying Club | 经视团购会 | HMG: Hubei ETV | Guest appearance From 2013 until 2014 |
| 2014 | Golden Mango Property | 金芒果地产 | HBS: Hunan Entertainment Channel | |
| 2014 | News and Science | 新闻大求真 | HBS: Hunan Television | From 2014 until 2016 |
| 2014 | SuperStar DingDong | 开门大吉 | CCTV: CCTV-3 | From May 2014 until March 2015 |
| 2014 | Baby Go | 一起向前冲 | HBS: Aniworld TV | |
| 2015 | The Icono-Clast | 偶像万万碎 | HBS: Mango TV | From March 2015 until December 2016 |
| 2015 | The Million Second Quiz | 百万秒问答 | HBS: Mango TV | |
| 2015 | I Am a Singer: Ready to Challenge | 我是歌手—谁来踢馆 | HBS: Mango TV | From December 5 until December 25 |
| 2015 | Hunan TV New Year Concert | 湖南卫视跨年演唱会 | HBS: Hunan Television | 2015–2016 |
| 2016 | Day Day Up | 天天向上 | HBS: Hunan Television | From January 15 until January 22 |
| 2016 | Worldwide Celebration of Chinese New Year | 全球华侨华人春节大联欢 | HBS: Hunan Television | |
| 2016 | Hunan TV Lantern Festival Gala | 湖南卫视元宵喜乐会 | HBS: Hunan Television | |
| 2016 | Super Girl | 超级女声 | HBS: Mango TV | Transposition Round, Top 20 Finalists and Finals |
| 2016 | CPC 95th Anniversary Gala | 湖南省庆祝中国共产党成立95周年文艺晚会 | HBS: Hunan Television | |
| 2016 | The 15th Chinese Bridge | 第十五届汉语桥世界大学生中文比赛 | HBS: Hunan Television | Grand Finale |
| 2017 | Eurovision 2017 Special Reports | 2017年欧洲歌唱大赛特别报道 | HBS: Mango TV | From May 9 until May 13 |
| 2017 | Super Boy | 快乐男声 | HBS: Mango TV | National Competitions |
| 2018 | 2017 Super IP Ceremony of China Literature | 2017阅文超级IP风云盛典 | HBS: Hunan Television | |
| 2018 | Enjoy Happiness Entirelife: Up! 2018 | 一生一世合家欢之向上吧2018 | HBS: Hunan ETV | |
| 2018 | 90th Academy Awards Special Reports | 芒果直击奥斯卡——第90届奥斯卡金像奖颁奖典礼特别报道 | HBS: Mango TV | |
| 2018 | Let's Sing Kids | 中国新声代 | HBS: Aniworld TV | Season 5 (except Ep. 4) |
| 2018 | The 17th Chinese Bridge | 第十七届汉语桥世界大学生中文比赛 | HBS: Hunan Television | Finals (except the Grand Finale) |
| 2018 | 2018 Forever Young Night | 2018青春芒果夜 | HBS: Mango TV | |
| 2018 | General Election of the People's Products | 人民的宝贝总决选 | HBS: Mango TV | |
| 2018 | The Hero of Music | 京东校园之星·天生音雄 | HBS: Mango TV | Grand Finale |
| 2019 | Opening Ceremony of the 3rd Belt and Road International Fashion Week | 第三届“一带一路”国际时尚周开幕式 | SXBC: Shaanxi Television | |
| 2019 | Award Ceremony of 2019 Child's Favorite | 2019“孩子的最爱”少儿新春盛典 | HBS: Mango TV | |
| 2019 | 91st Academy Awards Special Reports | 第91届奥斯卡金像奖颁奖典礼特别报道 | HBS: Mango TV | |
| 2019 | 4th Inke Live Star Night | 映客527星光夜 | HBS: Mango TV | |
| 2019 | 2019 Forever Young Night | 2019青春芒果夜 | HBS: Mango TV | |
| 2019 | Sweet Tasks | 甜蜜的任务 | HBS: Mango TV | Ep. 28 |
| 2020 | Me to Us | 我们的乐队 | HBS: Mango TV | |
| 2020 | Perfect Dating | 非常完美 | GTV: Guizhou Television | Start from August 7 |
| 2020 | 2020 Forever Young Night | 2020青春芒果夜 | HBS: Mango TV | |
| 2020 | Sunset Glow | 夕阳红 | CMG: CCTV-12 | Broadcasts on November 27 |
| 2020 | Sunset Glow | 夕阳红 | CMG: CCTV-12 | Broadcasts on December 11 |
| 2021 | The Great Arts | 了不起的艺能 | HBS: Mango TV | Ep. 1 |
| 2021 | Sweet Tasks | 甜蜜的任务 | HBS: Mango TV | Ep. 7, Ep. 40 |
| 2021 | Bargaining | 砍价大作战 | HBS: Mango TV | |
| 2021 | Haier Shopping Night | 披荆斩棘·海尔之夜 | HBS: Mango TV | |
| 2021 | Hunan TV 11.11 Super Fighting Night | 拼多多11.11超拼夜 | HBS: Hunan Television | |
| 2021 | Hunan TV New Year Concert | 湖南卫视跨年晚会 | HBS: Hunan Television | 2020–2021 |
| 2022 | Xiaomang New Year Shopping Festival | 小芒年货节 | HBS: Mango TV | |
| 2022 | Hunan TV Spring Festival Gala | 湖南卫视春节联欢晚会 | HBS: Hunan Television | |
| 2022 | Xiaomang Hanfu Festival | 云裳晓芒之夜 | HBS: Mango TV | |
| 2022 | Infinity and Beyond | 声生不息·港乐季 | HBS: Mango TV | |
| 2022 | Design Ideal Future: 618 Special | 设计理想家618特辑 | HBS: Mango TV | |
| 2022 | Flavor of Hunan Chinese Food: Special Program of Hunan Cuisine | 湖南好有味——中国粮·湖南饭特别节目 | HBS: Hunan Television | |

=== Variety shows ===
| Year | English Title | Chinese Title | Network | Notes |
|---|---|---|---|---|
| 2013 | Who's Still Standing? | 一站到底 | JSBC: Jiangsu Television | Broadcasts on September 26 |
| 2013 | Day Day Up | 天天向上 | HBS: Hunan Television | Broadcasts on November 29 |
| 2014 | SuperStar DingDong | 开门大吉 | CCTV: CCTV-3 | Broadcasts on February 3 |
| 2014 | App Collection | 应用宝典 | QHBTV: Qinghai Television | Ep. 1, Ep. 10 |
| 2014 | Hurry Up, Brother | 奔跑吧兄弟 | ZRTG: Zhejiang Television | Season 1 (Ep. 11) |
| 2014 | Day Day Up | 天天向上 | HBS: Hunan Television | Broadcasts on December 19 |
| 2015 | China Young | 中国少年派 | SDRT: Shandong Television | From February 7 until March 21 |
| 2015 | Tonight Go to Your Home | 今夜去你家 | Tencent Video | Ep. 1, Ep. 9 |
| 2016 | I Am a Singer | 我是歌手 | HBS: Hunan Television | Season 4 |
| 2016 | Let's Go | 出发吧我们 | YRT: Yunnan Television | Season 1 (except Ep. 4, Ep. 8, Ep. 9 and Ep. 11) |
| 2016 | Mom Loves U | 妈妈的牵挂 | HBS: Hunan Television | Ep. 14–Ep. 15 |
| 2016 | OMG Oh My God | OMG玩美咖 | HBS: Hunan Television World | Ep. 85, Ep. 87–Ep. 88, Ep. 111–Ep. 112, Ep. 113, Ep. 115 and Ep. 119 |
| 2016 | Run for Time | 全员加速中 | HBS: Hunan Television | Season 2 |
| 2016 | Come Sing with Me | 我想和你唱 | HBS: Hunan Television | Season 1 (Ep. 7, Ep. 9–Ep. 11) |
| 2016 | The Beauty of Chinese Civilization | 中华文明之美 | HBS: Hunan Television | Broadcasts on July 28 |
| 2016 | The 15th Chinese Bridge | 第十五届汉语桥世界大学生中文比赛 | HBS: Hunan Television | Finals (Game 1–Game 3, Game 5) |
| 2016 | Grade One: Graduation | 一年级·毕业季 | HBS: Hunan Television | |
| 2017 | Crew Interview | 果酱爱探班 | HBS: Mango TV | Ep. 19 |
| 2018 | Singer 2018 | 歌手2018 | HBS: Hunan Television | |
| 2018 | Are You Hunan Locals? | 你是湖南人不咯 | HBS: Hunan ETV | Broadcasts on January 27 |
| 2018 | Who's the Keyman | 我是大侦探 | HBS: Hunan Television | Ep. 3–Ep. 4 |
| 2018 | Come Sing with Me | 我想和你唱 | HBS: Hunan Television | Season 3 (Ep. 7) |
| 2018 | Mars World Cup | 火星世界杯 | HBS: Mango TV | Ep. 6–Ep. 8, Ep. 11 |
| 2018 | Crazy Maggie | 疯狂的麦咭 | HBS: Aniworld TV | Season 5 (Ep. 6) |
| 2019 | Singer 2019 | 歌手2019 | HBS: Hunan Television | |
| 2019 | Maggie's Kitchen | 麦咭小厨 | HBS: Aniworld TV | Ep. 6 |
| 2019 | Hunan TV Mid-Autumn Festival Gala | 湖南卫视中秋之夜 | HBS: Hunan Television | |
| 2019 | Perfect Dating | 非常完美 | GTV: Guizhou Television | Broadcasts on September 13 |
| 2019 | Global Chinese Music | 全球中文音乐榜上榜 | CMG: CCTV-15 | Broadcasts on September 14 |
| 2019 | Global Chinese Music | 全球中文音乐榜上榜 | CMG: CCTV-15 | Broadcasts on November 30 |
| 2020 | The Great Wall | 了不起的长城 | BMN: Beijing Television | Ep. 2 – 4, Ep. 8 – 9, Ep. 12 – 13 |
| 2020 | Right Now | 现在就告白 | Tencent Video | Season 4 (Ep. 7, Ep. 9 – 10, Ep. 12) |
| 2020 | Singer 2020 | 歌手·当打之年 | HBS: Hunan Television | |
| 2020 | Mind the Girls | 屋顶上的女孩 | Youku | |
| 2020 | I'm CZR | 我是唱作人 | iQiyi | Season 2 (Ep. 8 – 9) |
| 2020 | Coming Boom | 爆款来了 | Youku | Season 2 (Ep. 4) |
| 2020 | Global Chinese Music | 全球中文音乐榜上榜 | CMG: CCTV-15 | Broadcasts on October 10 |
| 2020 | Welcome New Life | 新生日记 | HBS: Mango TV | Season 2 (Ep. 11) |
| 2020 | Who's the Murderer | 明星大侦探 | HBS: Mango TV | Season 6 (NZND Top Stream Concert) |
| 2021 | Singing Grassland Songs | 唱起草原的歌 | NMTV: Nei Mongol Television | |
| 2021 | The Great Arts | 了不起的艺能 | HBS: Mango TV | Ep. 3, Ep. 6 – 7, Ep. 47 – 48 |
| 2021 | The Treasure | 谁是宝藏歌手 | HBS: Hunan Television | Codenamed less-than sign |
| 2021 | Meeting Mr. Right | 女儿们的恋爱 | HBS: Mango TV | Season 4 |
| 2021 | See You Again | 再次见到你 | HBS: Hunan Television | Ep. 16, Ep. 21, Ep. 23, Ep. 29 – 30, Ep. 35, Ep. 40, Ep. 43 |
| 2022 | Take Camping Take Pictures | 周末出片大会 | HBS: Mango TV | |
| 2022 | The Talent | 超脑少年团 | JSBC: Jiangsu Television | Season 2 |

== Discography ==
=== Extended plays ===
| Title | Details |
|---|---|
| The Fourth Person (李莎旻子的日记本Ⅳ之第四人称) | Released: 27 July 2022; Label: EE-Media; Format: Digital download |

=== Singles ===
| Title | Year | Peak chart positions | | Album |
| Title | Year | NetEase | QQ | Album |
|---|---|---|---|---|
| "Little Shrimp" (小虾) | 2017 | — | — | Non-album singles |
| "Growing Up" (放下) | 2018 | — | — | Non-album singles |
| "No Words, No Words" (无话，不说) | 2019 | — | — | Her Secret |
| "Who Do You Want" (想要什么人) | 2019 | — | — | Her Secret |
| "Starry Night" (星星) | 2019 | — | — | Her Secret |
| "I'm Sleepy, but I'm Unable to Fall Asleep" (我很困，可是我睡不着) | 2020 | — | — | Zero Leo 0 |
| "The Bucket List" (愿望清单) | 2020 | — | — | Zero Leo 0 |
| "I'm Waiting for You on the Eighth Day of a Week" (我在星期八等你) | 2020 | — | — | Zero Leo 0 |
| "Alone" (阿聋) | 2020 | — | — | Non-album single |
| "No Annoyance Place" (没有烦恼的地方) | 2021 | — | — | Weather Forecast |
| "Gurgles" (哗啦啦啦啦啦) | 2021 | — | — | Weather Forecast |
Unofficially released singles
| "Only One" | 2013 | — | — | Unofficially released single |
"—" denotes releases that did not chart or were not released in that region.

=== Soundtrack appearances ===
| Title | Year | Peak chart positions | | | Album |
| Title | Year | Baidu | Billboard | QQ | Album |
|---|---|---|---|---|---|
| "Little Shrimp" (小虾) | 2018 | — | — | — | Goal! Girls OST |
| "Ellipsis" (省略号) | 2018 | — | — | — | I Love You OST |
| "One Way Ticket" (单程车票) | 2018 | — | — | — | I Love You OST |
| "Dream to Fly" (梦见飞) | 2018 | — | — | — | I Love You OST |
| "Flipped" (喜欢你时风好甜) | 2018 | — | — | — | Flipped OST |
"—" denotes releases that did not chart or were not released in that region.

=== Collaborations ===
| Title | Year | Album |
|---|---|---|
| "Stars" (星辰) (feat. Various Artists) | 2016 | Non-album singles |
| "One Fine Day" (终有一天) (feat. Various Artists) | 2016 | Non-album singles |
| "The Shortest Poet" (最短的诗) (feat. Ron Huang) | 2017 | The Flowers Filled the Palace and Missed the Time OST |
| "However" (奈) (feat. Wang Yi) | 2018 | Buried City to Shut All Lights OST |
| "Are You Serious" (此话当真) (feat. Ron Huang) | 2019 | Non-album singles |
| "Half and Half" (一半一半) (feat. Tan Yu) | 2021 | Non-album singles |
| "Happy Tiger Shine Youth" (福虎耀青春) (feat. Chen Xiangshui and Fang Xiaodong) | 2022 | |

=== Songwriting credits ===
| Year | Album | Artist | Song | Lyrics | | Music | |
| Year | Album | Artist | Song | Credited | With | Credited | With |
|---|---|---|---|---|---|---|---|
| 2016 | Super Record | Yuan Ziyi | "If" | Yes | —N/a | Yes | Jiang Hongfeng |
| 2016 | Unofficially released single | Bibi Zhou | "Write to Future Myself" | Yes | Hong Xiaoxing; Zhou Binhui | No | —N/a |
| 2017 | Love Song | Zhang Liange | "Nobody Can Move My Cheese" | Yes | —N/a | No | —N/a |
| 2018 | 25 | Ning Huanyu | "Must Be Wonderful" | Yes | Ning Huanyu | No | —N/a |
| 2019 | Non-album single | Yuan Ziyi | "Microcosm" | Yes | —N/a | No | —N/a |

== Music videos ==
| Year | Title | Costar |
|---|---|---|
| 2014 | "Long Time No See" (好久不见) | Ma Ke |

== Theater ==
| Year | English Title | Chinese Title | Role |
|---|---|---|---|
| 2016 | The Taboo Game of Youth | 青春禁忌游戏 | Naoko Suzuki |
| 2018 | I Love You | 我AI你 | Meng Jianfei |
