= David Blair (tennis) =

American tennis player

- Country (sports): United States
- Born: June 29, 1971 (age 55)
- Prize money: $14,750

Singles
- Highest ranking: No. 1071 (Aug 3, 1992)

Grand Slam singles results
- US Open: Q1 (1993)

Doubles
- Career record: 1–1
- Highest ranking: No. 311 (May 8, 1995)

Grand Slam doubles results
- US Open: 2R (1993)

David Blair (born June 29, 1971) is an American former professional tennis player.

Blair played collegiate tennis for the University of Florida and won the NCAA Division I doubles championship with Mark Merklein in 1993. The pair received a wildcard into the doubles main draw of the 1993 US Open, falling in the second round to Patrick McEnroe and Richey Reneberg.
