= Eric Lin =

American surgeon and tennis player

- Country (sports): United States
- Born: October 14, 1975 (age 50) Orange County, California
- Plays: Right-handed

Doubles
- Career record: 0–1
- Highest ranking: No. 1068 (October 4, 1993)

Grand Slam doubles results
- US Open: 1R (1993)

Eric Lin (born October 14, 1975) is an American surgeon and former tennis player.

Lin grew up in Orange County, California and is of Taiwanese descent.

Ranked as high as eighth nationally in the 18s, Lin featured as a wildcard in the 1993 US Open men's doubles main draw. He and partner Glenn Weiner earned a place in the draw by winning the USTA championships in Kalamazoo.

From 1993 to 1997 he attended UCLA, where he played varsity tennis while studying for a degree in physiological science. He was a three-time All-American and served as the team's co-captain in his senior year.

A graduate of UCLA Medical School, Lin now works as an orthopaedic spine surgeon.
