= Song Dongye =

Chinese folk and ballad singer-songwriter

Song Dongye 宋冬野
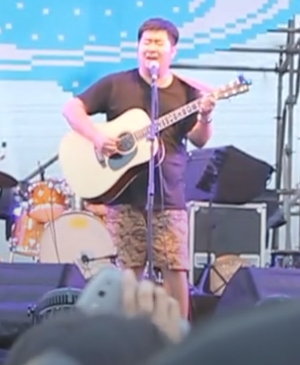
- Song Dongye performing

Background information
- Born: November 10, 1987 (age 38); Haidian District, Beijing, China
- Genres: Folk, ballad
- Occupation: Singer-songwriter
- Years active: 2009–present

Chinese name
- Traditional Chinese: 宋冬野
- Simplified Chinese: 宋冬野
Transcriptions
Standard Mandarin
- Hanyu Pinyin: Sòng Dōngyè
- Wade–Giles: Sung Tung-yeh

Song Dongye (Chinese: 宋冬野; pinyin: Sòng Dōngyě; born 10 November 1987) is a Chinese folk and ballad singer-songwriter. He was born in Haidian District, Beijing.

In 2009, Song began releasing music independently on Douban. In 2010, he released the solo album Xue Ni Hong Zhua (雪泥鸿爪), which included songs such as "Every Year" (年年), "Buddha on Line 1" (佛祖在一号线), and "Hey, Pants" (嘿，裤衩儿). In 2011, he co-founded the music label Mayouye Folk Organization (麻油叶民间组织) with Yao Shisan (尧十三) and Ma Di (马𬱖) and began performing solo shows.

In 2012, Song released the single "Miss Dong" (董小姐), for which he won the Best Folk Newcomer Award at the 13th Music Billboard Annual Ceremony in April 2013. In June 2013, contestant Zuo Li performed a cover of "Miss Dong" on the television talent show Super Boy, which brought widespread national attention to the song.

In December 2013, his album Anhe Bridge North (安和桥北) won the Lu Xun Cultural Award for Music of the Year.

In 2015, Song performed at the Modern Sky Festival in Central Park as part of an effort to introduce Chinese independent music to international audiences. His set featured introspective, narrative-driven folk songs. The New York Times described his music as “gently contemplative” and noted his popularity among young Chinese listeners for lyrics addressing everyday life and emotional honesty.

== Early life and education ==
Song Dongye was born in Anheqiao Village (now Xianghongqi Anheqiao community), Haidian District, Beijing, China, on November 10, 1987. His parents were both civil servants, and he was raised in a typical middle-class household. As a teenager, Song developed an interest in literature and underground music. He was particularly influenced by Chinese folk artists such as Zhao Lei and Xu Wei, as well as Western singer-songwriters like Bob Dylan and Damien Rice.

He attended the Beijing Institute of Fashion Technology (BIFT), majoring in fashion design. However, during his college years, Song became more immersed in music, often performing at local bars and student events. He later dropped out of university to pursue music full-time.

== Personal life ==
Song Dongye married Chinese actress Zhao Xiaolu in August 2016.

== Controversies ==
On 13 October 2016, he was detained in Beijing for possession of approximately 80 g of marijuana and received 15 days' administrative detention. In 2021, his planned comeback concert in Chengdu was canceled due to backlash over his past drug conviction. He later expressed his view that drug users are victims of addiction, igniting debate and resulting in his posts being moderated.

== Discography ==
- Xue Ni Hong Zhua (雪泥鸿爪) (2010)
- Anhe Bridge North (安河桥北) (2013)
- Guo Yuan Chao (郭源潮) (2017)
- Zai Xiang (再想想) (2026)

=== Singles ===
- "Miss Dong" (董小姐) (2012)
- "Zhi Dao" (知道) (2018)

== Awards and nominations ==
- Best Folk Newcomer, 13th Music Billboard Awards (2013) — "Miss Dong"
- Lu Xun Cultural Award – Music of the Year (2013) — Anhe Bridge North
- Best Lyrics, 29th Golden Melody Awards (2018) — Guo Yuan Chao
