= Gene Lau =

Chinese Cantopop lyricist

Gene Lau (Chinese: 劉卓輝) is a Cantopop lyricist. Since the late 1980s, he has written lyrics for over 300 songs. He has written more than ten hit songs for Beyond, contributing much to the rock band's reputation, with "Lovers"《情人》, "The Great Wall" 《長城》, and "The Earth" 《大地》, all of which have become band classics. He was known as the Queen lyricist of Beyond, after writing 23 songs for the group. He has also collaborated with other artists such as Jacky Cheung, Eason Chan, Leon Lai and Danny Summer.

== Early life ==
Growing up, Lau read political magazines, watched Western movies, listened to rock and roll music, and developed an understanding of the history of modern China. In the 1980s, he lived in a public housing estate in Hong Kong.

== Music career ==
After graduating from secondary school, he became the editor of entertainment magazine Modern Teenage Weekly《現代青年人周報》. He also set up a music production company in Foshan and participated in the production in the songs "Nothing"《一無所有》and "I Understand' 《不是我不明白》by Cui Jian.

In 1986, he participated in a Cantopop lyrics competition, held by the RTHK and sponsored by Taiwanese producer Lee Shou-chuan. Lau's entry, "The Unspeakable Future" 《說不出的未來》, won the competition and the song was given to singer Danny Summer to perform. Shortly before he had interviewed the band Beyond in 1983 after it had won a band competition held by Guitar Magazine《吉它雜誌》. Given his newly found fame, he offered to write the first song for Beyond, "Modern Stage" 《現代舞台》, but it did not gain much traction. However, Lau's second song for the band, "The Earth"《大地》 topped the RTHK charts and brought the band the 1st Top Ten Chinese Gold Songs Award.

In 1990 he founded a Chinese record company called Earth Records (大地唱片). He took on the role of producer and coordinator, with his duties including the selection of songs, writing of lyrics, arranging of songs, and recording and remixing of tracks. He produced many songs for famous singers in China. Folksongs in campus《校園民謠》was released in 1994 and set off a wave of folk songs in China.

In the 2000s, due to the influx of capital in the music industry, there was not much room for small and medium enterprises. Meanwhile, Lau did not want to co-operate with other record companies, so he retired to Zhuhai for five years. Currently, he has been devising a website to prompt the development of music by the Internet.

== Life as a lyricist ==
Lau said he wanted to be a rock guitarist when he was young but accidentally became a lyricist. Writing lyrics has given him a steady income over the past 20 years. Being a lyricist is a part-time job for Lau because for each song, a lyricist usually only receives HKD$1500–5000. This is only for those who have taken the advance payment, meaning that taking $5000 before receiving the rest of royalties. He tried not to receive “advance” for two years but realized he could not earn a living by writing a song for a few hundred dollars. Unlike famous singers, lyricists cannot count on the royalties from several classics while they have to produce a large number of songs.

== Reaction to the Tiananmen Square massacre ==
At an early age, he often read biographies of political figures, and had a positive impression of the Chinese Communist Party. The violent dispersing of the crowd of students in Tiananmen Square on 4 June 1989 caused Lau to become disillusioned with the party. Taking part in a demonstration in Hong Kong supporting the students in China before June 4, he felt defeated in their effort to reform the government and hence, lost faith in political demonstrations as a means of activism. Instead, he began to write more political songs. Many of his later works revolve around a political theme including "Time Flies" (歲月無聲), "The Great Wall" (長城) and "Never Forget it-June 4" (漆黑將不再面對). These songs are still sung during the annual Memorials for the 1989 protests in Hong Kong, and were also used during the Moral and National Education protests and the Umbrella Revolution.

== Second book ==
輝常傷感 is a collection of his essays on his moments with Beyond, Cui Jian, He Yong, Lo Ta-yu, Su Rui, and Donnie Yen. It also details the life of being a lyricist and reflects on the changes of modern China and other social issues. The book starts with how he views nature and role of being a lyricist. He mentions that he cannot write lyrics only for his own entertainment and quite often he has to compromise with producers of record company concerning the style and diction. Later on, when writing lyrics becoming part of his income, he has to struggle even more between his own thoughts and the market needs. He frequently emphasizes, in the book, that he has little love experience and thus writing love is a challenge for him. Yet, he does have a few times of having a crush into some girls and so he managed to write a few songs for Jacky Cheung about it. The last session of the book is written by many other musical worker who talk about Lau, including the style of his lyrics, the supplementary information of being a lyricist, comparison between different lyricists, and Lau's contribution of bringing songs from prospective mainland singers.

== Style and influence ==
Due to his teenage experience and exposure, he cares much for society but developed a little sense of melancholy in his political view. This can be seen in most of his works and also leads to more criticisms on politics, show business, and life. As a result, there are relatively fewer collections for other topics, though he had a few well-noted love songs like Always Be There《只想一生跟你走》,Cantabile Years《歲月如歌》, My Darling《我的親愛》. This attitude or orientation has influenced Beyond heavily. Previously, Beyond wrote songs more about personal matter and their frustration on their music path, but Lau's ideas broadened their range of themes.

Lau says that love songs dominate the market of Hong Kong, with Albert Leung and Wyman Wong being two major lyricists after the 1990s, especially songs that focus on being lovesick. However, except most of his rebellious and rock songs with Beyond, Lau still possesses his distinctive signature style in his love songs such as Cantabile Years《歲月如歌》and I Come from Beijing《我來自北京》. He demonstrates his personal style by incorporating cultural and political sense in both songs respectively. In an interview, Lau admitted that he was not the kind of lyricist that he would write anything for singers as long as they wanted but what he wanted to convey.

== Lyrics written ==
=== 1980s ===
1988

- Beyond – "Modern Stage"
- Beyond – "The Earth"
- Eddie Ng – " Unawareness"
- Rosanne Lui – "Civilized"
- Rosanne Lui – "Seeing is loving"
- Danny Summer – "Territory between wars"
- Danny Summer – "Confusing City"
- Danny Summer – "Unspeakable Future"
- Danny Summer – "Mediocre but Happy"
- Prudence Liew – "Love at first sight"
- Kenny Bee – "Don't be afraid"

1989

- Beyond – "Bygone Days"
- Eddie Ng – "Game System"
- Dominic Chow – "The Model"
- Dominic Chow – "Warm Needles"
- Bowie Lam – "Motorcycle"
- Danny Summer – "Mama, I Did Nothing Wrong"
- Danny Summer – "Figure out"
- Danny Summer – "Shut Up"
- Connie Mak – "Time Flies"
- Aling Choi – "Hope"
- Aling Choi – "Long Long Road"
- Aling Choi – "Excursion without Destination"
- Lowell Lo – "Bloody Sunset"
- Lowell Lo – "Never Forget it——June 4"
- Lowell Lo – "Exile"
- Mak Wai Ho – "Kiss You at that Night"
- Mak Wai Ho – "Walk through Tienanmen Square"
- Mak Wai Ho – "No Problem"
- Fanny Cheng Sui Fan – "Teenage‧Courage‧Tears"
- Fanny Cheng Sui Fan – "Full Stop of Love"

=== 1990s ===
1990

- Beyond – "Grey Track"
- Beyond – "Regret without Tears"
- Beyond – "For Those Who are Not Environmentally Friendly (Including Me)"
- Beyond – "You Know I'm Confused"
- Beyond – "Dark Space"
- Fundamental – "Bye Bye, Britain"
- Fundamental – "Exiling"
- Aling Choi – "Confidante"
- Fanny Cheng Sui Fan – "Mad Love"
- Lowell Lo – "Re-arrangement"
- Lowell Lo – "Be Tender with You"
- Lowell Lo – "His Song"
- Alan Tam – "Beloved Friends"

1991

- Beyond – "Who Would Accompany Me?"
- Vikki Tong – "Open Tonight"
- Danny Summer – "Acid Rain"
- Danny Summer – "You Let Me down"
- Jacky Cheung – "Can't Help"
- Jacky Cheung – "Willfulness"
- Jacky Cheung – "Foggy Night"
- Irene Wan – "Faraway Expectation"
- Pat Lau Choi-Yuk – "Waiting for Your Love"
- Pat Lau Choi-Yuk – "Heartbroken Cupid"
- Choi Hing Lun – "For You, for Me"
- Choi Hing Lun – "Thinking you madly, alone."
- Raymond Choi – "Wishful thinking"
- Stephanie Lai – "You Only Love Yourself"
- Stephanie Lai – "Between Love and Hate"
- Alan Tam – "Missy Mona"
- Christopher Wong – "Between Black and White"

1992

- Beyond – "Repay in a lifetime"
- Beyond – "The Great Wall"
- Beyond – "Farmer"
- Kam Chi Fai – "Old Dreams"
- Kam Chi Fai – "Take a Phone Call"
- Danny Summer – "Jeet Kune Do"
- Jacky Cheung – "Lovesick"
- Jacky Cheung – "Sparkles of Love"
- Jacky Cheung – "You're the Best"
- Jacky Cheung – "Give me myself"
- Andy Hui – "Let me have you"
- Priscilla Chan – "Daytime"
- Hunning Luk – "Still in Love with You"
- Sam Tsang Hong Sang – "How are You Now?"
- Tong Bo-yu – "First Love"
- Tong Bo-yu – "Troubling Oneself"
- Prudence Liew – "Love Other's Lovers"
- Pat Lau Choi-Yuk – "Never-Ending Saga"
- Pat Lau Choi-Yuk – "From lovers to friends"
- Leon Lai – "I Come from Beijing"
- Leon Lai – "My Cinderella"
- Leon Lai – "Where do broken hearts go"
- Leon Lai – "My Darling"
- Leon Lai – "I love ICHI BAN"
- Leon Lai – "Dream Like"
- Leon Lai – "Romance before Sunset"
- Vivian Lai – "First Kiss in Summer"
- Lowell Lo – "Always on my mind"
- Lowell Lo – "See you again"
- Alan Tam – "Dreaming beautiful women"

1993

- Beyond – "Lover"
- Rosanne Lui – "Blaming Heaven"
- Nicky Wu – "Refused to give up"
- Vivian Chow – "Sorry, My Dear"
- Vivian Chow – "Dream of you"
- Vivian Chow – "Love song Sha La La"
- George Lam – "I'm in your heart"
- Lam Fan – "Hope You're crying for me"
- Dicky Cheung – "Your Back"
- Jacky Cheung – "Just want my life with you"
- Jacky Cheung – "Forgive her"
- Jacky Cheung – "The feeling of love remains"
- Jacky Cheung – "Unknowingly"
- Priscilla Chan – "Relax for 3 mins"
- Angela Pang – "I'm Not In Love"
- Irene Wan – "The future of love"
- Sally Yeh – "Another day with you"
- Sally Yeh – "Forever Young "
- Andy Lau – "The dream"
- Andy Lau – "She's So Adorable"
- Andy Lau – "She is my First Lover"
- Ram Chiang – "Together"
- Leon Lai – "Please don't go"
- Leon Lai – "My another half"
- Leon Lai – "Compunction"
- Leon Lai – "Burning Summer"
- Leon Lai – "Wild Love"
- Leon Lai – "Laughter at the end of century"
- Leon Lai and Priscilla Chan – "Forever"
- Gigi Lai – "Love"
- Stephanie Lai – "love and hate"
- Alan Tam – "Instant Speechlessness"
- Alan Tam – "The one who knows me well"
- Shirley Kwan – "Get a crush"
- William So – "Love Experiment"

1994

- Beyond – "Help You"
- Beyond – "Face it"
- Eric Moo – "Dream-like life"
- Eric Moo – "Too Naive"
- Dick Lee – "Freedom"
- Anita Lee – "Occasional visitors"
- George Lam – "The sky and Earth"
- Eric Suen Yiu Wai – "Farewell"
- Steven Ma – "Memory"
- Norman Cheung – "You're the most important today"
- Jacky Cheung – "Care for others"
- Leon Lai – "Un-drunk night"
- Leon Lai – "An Oath"
- Leon Lai – "You're Still My Darling"
- Leon Lai – "Accompany You"
- Leon Lai – "Angel's Temptation"
- Leon Lai – "Sunshine"
- Ekin Cheng – "Tired"
- Kevin Cheng – "The feeling of lovesick O-A-O"
- Kevin Cheng – "A crush on you"
- Roman Tam Pak Sin – "Hope you know that"
- Alan Tam and Shirley Kwan – "Being Single"

1995

- Eric Moo – "Because you're hurt"
- Eric Moo – "Don't believe in yourself"
- Eric Moo – "Too Naive"
- Kong Yin – "Between boys and girls"
- Priscilla Chan – "Fixation"
- Priscilla Chan – "Miss the past"
- Leon Lai – "Kiss me in the moonlight"
- Leon Lai – "Just For Fun"
- Leon Lai – "Unintentional"

1996

- Beyond – "Space"
- Beyond – "A long night is fraught with dreams"
- Beyond – "Guilt"
- Eric Moo – "Hope that you're my lover"
- Eric Moo – "Vicissitudes in love"
- Ekin Cheng- Friendships"
- Ekin Cheng – "Replace you"
- Leon Lai – "Incredible Dreams"

1997

- Beyond – "Let go of your hand"
- Eric Suen Yiu Wai – "Flying"
- Julian Cheung ChiLam – "Bittersweet"
- Eason Chan – "No left or right in love"
- Leon Lai – "Talking and dancing"
- Leon Lai – "You let me forget it"
- Leon Lai – "Adventure"
- Leon Lai – "Tormented"
- Nicholas Tse – "Days without Emails"

1998

- Beyond – "I Don't Believe it"
- Beyond – "Invincible"
- Beyond – "Crossroads"
- Dry – "In the old times"
- Leo Ku – "Smattering"
- Leo Ku – "Endless flying"
- Andy Hui – "I can fly"
- Alan Tam – "Let's get in love in this season"

1999

- Beyond – "A fault on the right side"
- Leo Ku – "In the daylight"
- Nick Cheung – "Groundhog Day"
- Jacky Cheung – "Earthling"
- Andy Hui – "Miss You"
- Eason Chan – "Good Mood"
- Eason Chan – "Suddenly sad"
- Bondy Chiu – "Disappearance"（Co-write with Peter Cheung
- Nicholas Tse and Stephen Fung and Sam Lee – "You Can't Stop Me"（Co-write with Peter Cheung）
- Alan Tam and Jacky Cheung and Ronald Cheng – "Grateful"

=== 2000s ===
2000

- Dave Wang – "From Now On"
- Eason Chan – "Made in Hong Kong"
- Priscilla Chan – "This day"
- Priscilla Chan – "A New Era of Love"
- Wasteland – "Incomparable"
- Yip Sai Wing – "Everything's Gonna be Fine"
- Carina Lau Kar-ling – "Someday"
- Gallen Lo – "So"
- Nicholas Tse – "Accompany Me"

2001

- Swing – "Prehistoric universe"
- Ding Fei Fei – "Reborn"
- Mango Wong – "Soliloquizing"
- Bowie Lam – "Ronin"
- Wong Koon Chung Paul – "having relationships"
- Wong Koon Chung Paul – "Goodnight, Hong Kong"
- Wong Koon Chung Paul – "The Wasteland"
- Ip Pui Man Grace – "Walking alone"

2002

- Wong Ka Ming – "We Can Change"
- Athena Chu – "Between You and I" (Co-write with Fung Wing Kei)
- Athena Chu – "Jump"
- Athena Chu – "Cat and Fish"
- Ambrose Hui – "Forget"
- Wong Koon Chung Paul – "Invisible Man"
- Wong Koon Chung Paul – "At Victoria Peak"
- Wong Koon Chung Paul – "If God knows"
- Yumiko Cheng – "Waste your effort"

2003

- Athena Chu – "Don't be indecisive"
- Eason Chan – "Cantabile Years"
- Tats Lau Yee-Tat Feat. Wong Koon Chung Paul – "From the Past till Now"

2005

- BABY Q – "I Love U"

2008

- Steve Wong Ka Keung – "Nobody is playing"
- Steve Wong Ka Keung – "Olympic Game"
- Steve Wong Ka Keung – "We Are The People"

2009

- Kolor – "Encircling a city"
- Philip Wei – "Marriage"
- Linda Chung – "For Love"

=== 2010s ===
2010

- Pop Stars – "Sunrise"
- Pop Stars – "Sunrise"（Mandarin）

2011

- Mr. – "Life is short"
- Danny Summer – "Eye In The Sky"
- Alfred Hui Ting-hang – "Ant"（Co-write with James Wong）
- Alfred Hui Ting-hang – "Ant"（Mandarin）（Co-write with James Wong）
- Wong Koon Chung Paul – "Don't Wake Me Up"
- Wong Koon Chung Paul – "I Understand, I don't Understand"

2012

- Mr. – "Yesterday"（co-writing with Mr.）
- Mr. – "Now"（co-writing with Mr.）
- Hubert Wu – "Forgive"
- Hubert Wu – "Bliss"
- Alfred Hui Ting-hang – "Mask"（co-writing with Alfred Hui Ting-hang）
- Alfred Hui Ting-hang – "Dwelling"
- Alfred Hui Ting-hang – "Umbrella"
- Alfred Hui Ting-hang – "Aftertaste"
- Alfred Hui Ting-hang – "Island"
- Pop Stars in the universal studio – "Unforgettable moment"（co-writing with Mr.）

2013

- Closer – "Keep Fighting"（co-writing with Johnny Choi）
- Kolor – "Summer Birds"
- Mr. – "Walk around"（Co-write with Mr.）
- Mr. – "Bygone Dreams"（Co-write with Mr.）
- Dominic Chow and Yip Sai Wing – "A Love Song"
- Hubert Wu – "Then"
- Hubert Wu – "Forbear"（Co-write with Chen Jie）

2014

- Gentlemen – "Home"
- N-SONIC – "Continuous Running"
- Eric Moo – "My Friend!"（Co-write with Ma Zhiyu）
- Joe Ma Tak-chung – "Blood and Sweat"
- Law Kwan Moon and Hoffman Cheng – "Dark Fate"

2015

- Alex Chia – "Goodfellas"
- Mr. – "Love You"（co-writing with MJ）
- Mr. – "Border Down"
- Alfred Hui Ting-hang and Hubert Wu – "Truth"
