= Lo-Jung Chen =

Taiwanese musician

Lo-Jung Chen (陳樂融) is a Taiwanese lyricist in the Chinese music industry and has written over 500 songs, marketed and promoted hundreds of albums on the UFO Records label. He's also a screenplay for theater productions and the host for radio and internet broadcasting shows.

Chen had supported the establishment of UFO Radio and iWant-Radio, and was involved in the founding of MÜST, an NPO formed to protect the IP of Taiwanese musicians, and MCU, the first musicians union established.

== Early life ==
During his college life in Cheng Kung University as a Civil Engineering student, Chen had been active at extracurricular activities, including Debate Club, NCKU Youth Club, NCKU News Center, International Relations Research Club, Theater Club, etc. He also hosted the first NCKU film festival as the leader of Communications in Debate Club. Chen also received nine NCKU Phoenix Literature Awards in five different areas: poetry, prose, novel, critic, and screenplay; of which the last two areas were the first place. His writings can also be seen in publications such as Chung Wai Literary and Taiwan Daily. In his senior year, Chen translated and modified the play “A Woman of No Importance 無足輕重的女人” by Oscar Wilde, which was performed on campus. He also organized and managed the first “NCKU Arts Night”, a cross-club activity.

After military service, Chen started his job as an editor at Commonwealth Publishing Group, in where he was later transferred to marketing and received trainings for marketing management. Upon leaving Commonwealth Publishing, Chen became the marketing director of Jiu Da Wen Hua Publisher, and took part in publishing “1986 Taiwan Image Yearbook 1986 台灣影像年鑑”.

== Career ==
=== Records marketing ===
Chen entered the Chinese music industry in the mid 80’s when the concept of records marketing was just growing. He joined UFO Records in marketing and contributed in the forms of press releases and copywriting. As an A&R, Chen needed to position the singers, establish their styles and images, and tailor-make the record albums with clear themes. Chen later served in different roles including UFO's Business Development Head, Marketing Director, A&R Director, etc. He has contributed to the successful release of all UFO records at the time, including works from Chin Tsai, Julie Sue, Jeanette Wang, Dave Wong, Augustine Yeh, The Little Tigers, etc. The pattern of Chen publishing lyrics as the marketing manager has later become a norm in the music industry in Taiwan.

=== Songwriting ===
During Chen's career in record companies, he'd been involved in the copywriting, producing, and marketing of over hundreds of records. As a lyricist, he's published over 500 songs (both in Mandarin and Taiwanese), and has been regarded the most profitable lyricist with works staying on chart for the longest period. His first lyrics “You Wo You Ni 有我有你”, was written together with Yu Zhang Zhan, and this song served as the hit song for Annie Yi, Donna Chiu, Wen-Lin Fang. Chen often wrote the lyrics for Chih-Yuan Chen's song, and this combination of Chih-Yuan Chen's melody with Lo-Jung Chen's lyrics has become the representative of hit songs in the 80’s and 90’s. Examples of which include “Miss You Everyday 天天想你” by Tom Chang, “Gan En De Xin 感恩的心” by Fei Fei Ouyang, “Is it True That I Have Nothing 是否我真的一無所有” by Dave Wong, and “Never Turning Back 永遠不回頭”, the theme song for the movie Seven Foxes, etc.

Other Chen's classic lyrics include “Merry Go Round 瀟灑走一回” by Sally Yeh, “Looking Back 再回首” by Yu-Heng Chiang, “I Love You Forever 對你愛不完” by Aaron Kwok, “Not Every Love Song Has Beautiful Memories 不是每個戀曲都有美好回憶” by Jimmy Lin, “Dream a Whole Life for Love 為了愛夢一生” and “Annie 安妮” by Dave Wong, “Put My True Love in Your Hand 放我的真心在你的手心” and “Remember Our Commitment 記得我們有約” by Augustine Yeh, “Wen Qin 問情” by Delphin Tsai, and “Wang Shi Jiu Shi Wo De An Wei 往事就是我的安慰” by Lei Chen, etc. Chen's peak in releasing songs was 1988-1990, when it would usually take him two to four hours to finish a song. Despite having left record companies since 1996, Chen still continues to publish lyrics by invitation. His recent works include “Wu Guan Le 無關了” by Jia Jia, produced by Mayday Masa; “Wo Dou Ji De 我都記得” (by A-Lin), the theme song for the movie “The Arti: the Adventure Begins”, etc.

Other than writing lyrics for music of a variety of styles, Chen is also an expert in tailoring lyrics from a marketing perspective to serve certain purposes, such as for films, events, or organizations. He can deliver lyrics that are suitable for singers and widely acceptable by the public while also conveying the marketing messages. Some examples include group performing songs like “Mei Jiu Shi Xin Zhong You Ai 美就是心中有愛”, “Lie Huo Qin Chun 烈火青春”, “Xiang Qin Xiang Ai 相親相愛”, “Rang Ai Zhuan Dong Zheng Ge Yu Zhou 讓愛轉動整個宇宙”, “Feng Huo 烽火”, etc. A few of these songs have also been re-produced again for charity purposes, such as “Rang Ai Zhuan Dong Zheng Ge Yu Zhou 讓愛轉動整個宇宙” was originally a ten year anniversary song for the 1999 Jiji Earthquake victims, and it has been re-recorded by Jam Hsiao in 2019 at the twentieth anniversary for the 1999 Jiji Earthquake. Although Chen isn't among the top in terms of number of songs released in the industry, he is the lyricist with the greatest number of singers who's recorded his song. Artists from different generations, including Mayday, Crowd Lu, Yoga Lin, Vivian Hsu, Weibird, Lala Hsu, Fish Leong, Fang Wan, Bobby Chen, Julie Sue, Chin Tsai, Jeanette Wang, Delphine Tsai, Augustine Yeh, Dave Wong, Tom Chang, Michelle Pan, Fu De Hsiao and many more, have all recorded songs written by Chen.

=== Radio broadcasting and internet business ===
In the realm of radio and internet broadcasting, Chen played various roles such as executive manager, host, and producer. Since 1989, he has served as the host for radio stations including Voice of Han, Fu Hsing Broadcasting Station, Broadcasting Corporation of China, Best Radio, The voice of the Asian, KAZN AM1300, ICN CAVoice, etc. Chen made his debut at broadcasting back in 1996 under the invitation of Kuo-Hua Peng. He was involved with the founding and marketing of UFO Radio, and achieved number one in Gallup Ratings in the second year. As the VP for programs, Chen hosted programs including “Da Meng Siang Jia大夢想家”, “The Winner in Marketing 行銷大贏家”, “Xin Ling Tou Shou 心靈投手”, “Good Night My Love 晚安我的愛”, of which “Da Meng Siang Jia 大夢想家” was awarded with “Community Program Award 社會建設獎” by the Government Information Office in 1999.

From 2002-2008 he served as the host and producer in Voice of Taipei “Enjoy Music 音樂Enjoy”. In 2015, he further expanded his broadcasting region overseas and hosted a 365-day show at FM948 Suzhou Music Radio. Since 2011, Chen started hosting at IC Broadcasting for the program “Sense and Sensibility 理性與感性”.

Other than radio broadcasting, internet media is also another place where Chen has made a lot of contributions to. Back in 1999 when internet radio just started, he founded what later became the current “iWant-Radio” with iWant-in.net Inc. In 2000, Chen has founded iwant-Music with Johnny Chen and served as the CEO, creating the first 24/7 online music channel with a real host, developing talents like Phoebe Huang, Michael Shih, Mindy Quah, June Tsai, Shan-Wei Chang to become music channel DJs. In 2002 upon the end of iwant-Music, Chen served as the Media Director for iWant-in.net Inc for a year.

In 2000, Chen started to be the host of “Yin He Mian Dui Mian 銀河面對面” at iWant-Radio. The show is still active and has accumulated more than 2,000 episodes, marking the record of the longest living show in Chinese internet broadcasting history. As the first music industry professional to set foot in the broadcasting industry, Chen is still hosting the show and has interviewed artists from different generations such as Richie Jen, Mayday, Da-Yu Lo, Jay Chou, Jolin Tsai, Yu-Fen Ma, Sandee Chan, Rene Liu, Sheng Xiang Lin, Roger Yang, Sodagreen, Lala Hsu, G.E.M., Eggplant Egg, Bii, Nick Chou, OSN, etc. He has also been inviting guests from not only the music industry but also from the film industry and theaters.

=== Theater productions ===
Other than music industry, Chen has also produced and written numerous lyrics and scripts for theater productions. His first collaboration with Godot Theatre Company started in 1994, when producer Serina Chen and Director James Chi-Ming Liang invited him to modify Shakespeare's theatrical production “The New Taming of the Shrew 新馴悍記”. Chen had served as the lyricist and screenplay for many theater productions since then, and has released over hundreds of songs in musicals. In 2001, Chen took the role as Godot Theatre Company's Chief Producer. He was the screenplay for “Email Email 情人” in 1998, which later was awarded “Best Original Screenplay” by the 1st Taiwan Globe de Cristal Awards. Chen also did the scriptwriting and lyrics for the Latino Musical “Angel: The City that Never Sleeps 天使不夜城”, which was later awarded with “Best Film” by Taiwan Globe de Cristal Awards. Chen was also nominated as the “Best Lyricist” in GMA with the song “Du Zi Yi Ge Ren Chang Ge 獨自一個人唱歌” in the musical “Wonderful World 我要成名”.

Chen's works include “Cyrano de Bergerac 大鼻子情聖西哈諾”, “Kiss Me, Nana 吻我吧娜娜”, “Email Email 情人”, “Angel: The City that Never Sleeps 天使不夜城”, “Super Dad 超級奶爸”, “We're No Angels 冒牌天使”, “Love for All Seasons 接送情”, “Love Ya Mom 愛呀，我的媽！”, “An Accident Of Love 搭錯車”, etc. In 2019, “Love Ya Mom 愛呀，我的媽！” had performances in Singapore, which is Godot Theatre Company's first overseas musical performance since 2001. “An Accident Of Love 搭錯車” also started a second world tour in 2019.

In TV and films, Chen has also taken part as the screenplay and producer. His contributions include scriptwriting for “Taipei Love Story – Love Makes Us Weird 台北愛情故事之愛情讓人有點怪”, “Hao Siang Gen Ni Shuo 好想跟你說”, Tencent internet movie “You Are My Guiding Star 我的燈塔就是你”, and the Creative Director of the documentary “Returning Home 日暮歸鄉”, etc.

=== Corporate experiences ===
With management experience in the music and broadcasting industries, business acumen, and understanding of arts and music, Chen frequently receives invitations from corporates for consultant or management positions. In 2007, he assumed the position of Chairman/Strategic Director for Allgenki Entertainment Business Inc., and established Allgenki Ticket (currently tixcraft.com), an exclusive platform for Chinese Professional Baseball League and other sports events. In 2009, he established Oh Ya Mobile Media Corporation, Taiwan's first ringtone advertisement platform. Over the years, he has also served in the PAR magazine as the Editor Committee Member, Kuan's Living as a Branding Consultant, Love Hope Foundation as the 7th and 8th board member, and LINE TV Taiwan as a Strategic Consultant.

=== Public affairs ===
Chen is often invited to serve as the panel judge, consultant, or committee member for public affairs that are related to music and arts. Being the only person to have judging experiences across all four major art awards, Chen has served as the judge for Golden Melody Awards (GMA), Golden Horse Awards, Television Golden Bell Awards, and Broadcast Golden Bell Awards. He's also the chief convener for the judging committee of the 20th GMA.

The Taipei City Government and the Ministry of Culture appointed Chen to conduct the projects of Taipei Music Center and National Performing Arts Center. He served as the committee member for both projects and was involved with the establishment of these centers. Chen also supported the founding of the National Taichung Theater and National Kaohsiung Center for the Arts.

Chen has also served in government projects as the committee member for over 20 different projects from the Department of Cultural Affairs in Taipei City Government, including, “Taiwan Pop Music Oral History Exhibition and Cultural Preservation Project”, “Grant for Film Productions”, etc. He's also the consultant for over ten projects from both the Government Information Office and the Ministry of Culture, such as “Flagship Records Production Plan and Propaganda Fund Project”, “Educational Materials for Understanding of Pop Music”, etc.

Chen has devoted much time in the contributions toward music related NPOs in Taiwan. He had assumed the positions of MÜST's 1st Supervisor, 5th-7th Board Member, and the 7th President of the board. Other than that, he had served in The Association of Music Workers in Taiwan as the third to sixth council member. In 2015, Chen founded Music Creators Union (MCU) with many musicians and was elected as the 1st Chairman, and later as the Honorary Chairman after his resignation.

=== Writing ===
Chen has published 25 books with topics ranging from fiction, prose, music appreciation, to tarot fortune telling; many of which are published again electronically.

=== Other appearances ===
The array of experiences that Chen has accumulated also include being the instructor at Shih Hsin University and the CTS Cultural Education Foundation, panel judge and award presenter for Elle Style Awards, and the Celebrity Ambassador for 2014 Art Taipei. Chen also participated in the 6th and 7th Cross-Strait Youth New Media Symposium.

== Works ==
With over 500 lyrics published, Chen has many classic works including:

| 歌手 | 歌名 |
|---|---|
| Sally Yeh | 瀟灑走一回 |
| Yu-Heng Chiang | 再回首、一世情緣、想哭就哭、痛快的歌 |
| Tom Chang | 天天想你、想念我 |
| Tracy Huang | 讓愛自由、日安．我的愛 |
| Chih Lei Wang | 悲歡歲月 |
| Fei Fei Ouyang | 感恩的心 |
| Oriental Express | 紅紅青春敲呀敲 |
| Pin-Yuan Huang | 它給我不同的快樂、留下來陪你生活 |
| Delphine Tsai | 問情 |
| Lei Chen | 往事就是我的安慰 |
| Fu-Tr Shiao | 華西街的一蕊花 |
| Red Hot Boys | 亮出我的年輕護照、閃亮的心永遠愛你 |
| The Little Tigers | 逍遙遊、今天看我、叫你一聲my love |
| Aaron Kwok | 對你愛不完、傷心的話留到明天再說 |
| Jimmy Lin | 不是每個戀曲都有美好回憶 |
| Dave Wong | 是否我真的一無所有、為了愛夢一生、安妮、向太陽怒吼、孤星 |
| Michelle Pan | 癡情不是一種罪過、對你的10個疑問 |
| Sammi Cheng | 至理名言 |
| A-Mei | 排山倒海 |
| Pei-An Yang | 痛也不說出口的我、沒有白活、只要再看你一眼 |
| Ailing Tai | 可惜你不在 |
| Donna Chiu, Fang Wen-Lin, Annie Yi | 有我有你 |
| Andy Lau | 今天 |
| Jacky Cheung | 相信她，關心她 |
| Huan Yeh | 記得我們有約、放我的真心在你的手心、誰在秋天撿到我的心 |
| Zhao Chuan | 忘不了的事，忘不了的人 |
| Julie Sue | 砂之船、我不該看你的眼神、夢醒的我、一切為明天 |
| David Lui | 朋友別哭 |
| Chin Tsai | 你是我心中雲一朵、火舞 |
| Group | 美就是心中有愛、烈火青春、永遠不回頭、相親相愛、讓愛轉動整個宇宙、烽火 |

== Theater productions ==
| Musicals | Released by | First performed |
|---|---|---|
| “Cyrano de Bergerac 大鼻子情聖‧西哈諾” | Godot Theatre Company | 1995 |
| “Kiss Me, Nana 吻我吧娜娜” | Godot Theatre Company | 1997 |
| “Angel: The City that Never Sleeps 天使不夜城” | Godot Theatre Company | 1998 |
| “City Lights 城市之光” | Godot Theatre Company | 2002 |
| “Wonderful World 我要成名” | Godot Theatre Company | 2007 |
| “The Marriage of Figaro 費加洛婚禮” | National Taipei University of the Arts | 2008 |
| “Hello Dolly! 我愛紅娘” | Godot Theatre Company | 2010 |
| “Spiral Show 海棠‧秀” | Wanda Group | 2011 |
| “Mamma Mia! 媽媽咪呀” (Chinese Version) | SMG Performing Arts Group | 2011 |
| “Mountains and Seas 山海經傳” | National Taiwan Normal University | 2013 |
| “The Star-星星的約定” | iSee Taiwan Foundation | 2014 |
| “Love Ya Mom愛呀，我的媽！” | Godot Theatre Company | 2017 |
| “An Accident Of Love搭錯車” | Believe In Music International | 2018 |

| Plays | Organizations | First Performed |
|---|---|---|
| “The New Taming of the Shrew新馴悍記” | Godot Theatre Company | 1994 |
| “Email E-MAIL情人” | Godot Theatre Company | 1998 |
| “My First Wives我的大老婆” | Godot Theatre Company | 2005 |
| “The Apartment公寓春光” | Godot Theatre Company | 2006 |
| " Irma la Douce巴黎花街” | Godot Theatre Company | 2007 |
| “Super Dad 超級奶爸” | Godot Theatre Company | 2013 |
| “We’ re No Angels 冒牌天使” | Godot Theatre Company | 2014 |
| “Love for All Seasons 接送情” | Godot Theatre Company | 2016 |

== Writings ==
Most writings are re-published electronically.

| Title | Explanation | Publisher | 年份 |
|---|---|---|---|
| 日安‧我的愛 | Tattler literary style | 圓神 | 1989 |
| 你情我願 | Essay | 圓神 | 1990 |
| 尋找生命的活水源頭 | Prose | 圓神 | 1991 |
| 舞夢——麥可‧傑克森的心靈冒險 | Translation | 時報 | 1992 |
| 用青春追夢的人 | Prose | 圓神 | 1992 |
| 星座刑事——雙子星的危險童話 | Comic-based novel by Kao Yung | 大然 | 1993 |
| 枕頭邊的音樂會 | Music critics column in Independence Evening Post | 麥田 | 1994 |
| 晚安‧我的愛 | Tattler literary style | 圓神 | 1996 |
| 初戀24小時 | Tattler literary style | 圓神 | 1997 |
| 超越今生的學習 | Philosophical prose | 元尊 | 1997 |
| 行銷你自己直到成功 | Audiobook | 元尊 | 1997 |
| 我在花花世界 | Columns collection in Great News and Min Sheng Bao | 大塊 | 1997 |
| 橘子需要愛 | Novel | 紅色 | 1998 |
| 2025：新小王子21世紀地球探險 | Graphic book | 商智 | 1999 |
| 我們一起說愛情 （與資深廣播人陳美倫合著） | | 三品 | 2000 |
| 通往幸福的密語 | Prose | 方智 | 2000 |
| 無限可能的起點：20歲不可不知 | Tattler literary style | 智慧事業體 | 2001 |
| 向某些自己道別 | Prose | 印刻 | 2003 |
| 愛要自由才幸福—66個愛與自由的疑問與解答 (in the name of 安哲逸) | Prose | 聯合文學 | 2003 |
| 安哲逸塔羅牌之天長地久—36個戀愛‧婚姻‧約會DIY靈測 | Tarot Trilogy: Episode I | 聯合文學 | 2004 |
| 安哲逸塔羅牌之名利雙收—36個學業‧事業‧財富DIY靈測 | Tarot Trilogy: Episode II | 聯合文學 | 2004 |
| 安哲逸說塔羅牌—靈思者的78個疑問與解答 | Tarot Trilogy: Episode III | 聯合文學 | 2005 |
| 我，作詞家—陳樂融與14位詞人的創意叛逆 | Interviews | 天下雜誌 | 2010 |
| 我，作詞家（簡體版） | | 天津華文天下出版社 | 2011 |
| 浮生 | Prose | 凱特文化 | 2015 |
| 浮生（簡體版） | | 中國出版集團現代出版社 | 2017 |

== Awards and nominations ==
| Year | Award | Work | Result |
|---|---|---|---|
| 1990 | “Song of the Year最佳年度歌曲” in 1st Golden Melody Awards | Lyricist for “Remember Our Commitment 記得我們有約” | Nominated |
| 1992 | “Best Lyricist 最佳作詞人獎” in 15th Golden Tripod Awards for Publication 第十五屆金鼎獎 | Lyricist for “Merry Go Round 瀟灑走一回” | Awarded |
| 1993 | “Best Lyricist for Dialect Songs 最佳方言歌曲作詞人獎” in 4th Golden Melody Awards | Lyricist for “Hua Si Jie De Yi Rui Hua 華西街的一蕊花” | Nominated |
| 1993 | “Song of the Year 最佳年度歌曲獎” in 4th Golden Melody Awards | Lyricist for “Merry Go Round 瀟灑走一回” | Awarded |
| 1995 | “Best Lyricist for Mandarin Songs最佳國語歌曲作詞人獎” in 6th Golden Melody Awards | Lyricist for “Gan En De Xin 感恩的心” | Nominated |
| 1996 | “Best Lyricist for Mandarin Songs最佳國語歌曲作詞人獎” in 7th Golden Melody Awards | Lyricist for “Siang Qin Siang Ai 相親相愛” | Nominated |
| 1998 | “Best Original Screenplay 最佳原著劇本獎” in 1st Taiwan Globe de Cristal Awards第一屆台灣晶球獎 | Screenplay for “Email E-mail情人” | Awarded |
| 1999 | “Community Program Award廣播電視社會建設獎” | Host for radio broadcast show “Da Meng Siang Jia 大夢想家” | Awarded |
| 2009 | “Best Lyricist” in Golden Melody Awards | Lyricist for “Du Zi Yi Ge Ren Chang Ge 獨自一個人唱歌” in the musical “Wonderful World 我要成名” | Nominated |
| 2018 | MÜST – “Annual Impact Award for Performance” | --- | Awarded |

== Judging appearances ==
| Program | Channel | Year |
|---|---|---|
| Super Idol | SET TV, TTV | 2007-2009 |
| Jin Qu Chao Ji Xing | CTV | 2010 |
| Asian Idol Group Competition | CTS | 2012 |
| I am a Singer | China Hunan TV | 2013 |
