= Chinese Musicians' Association =

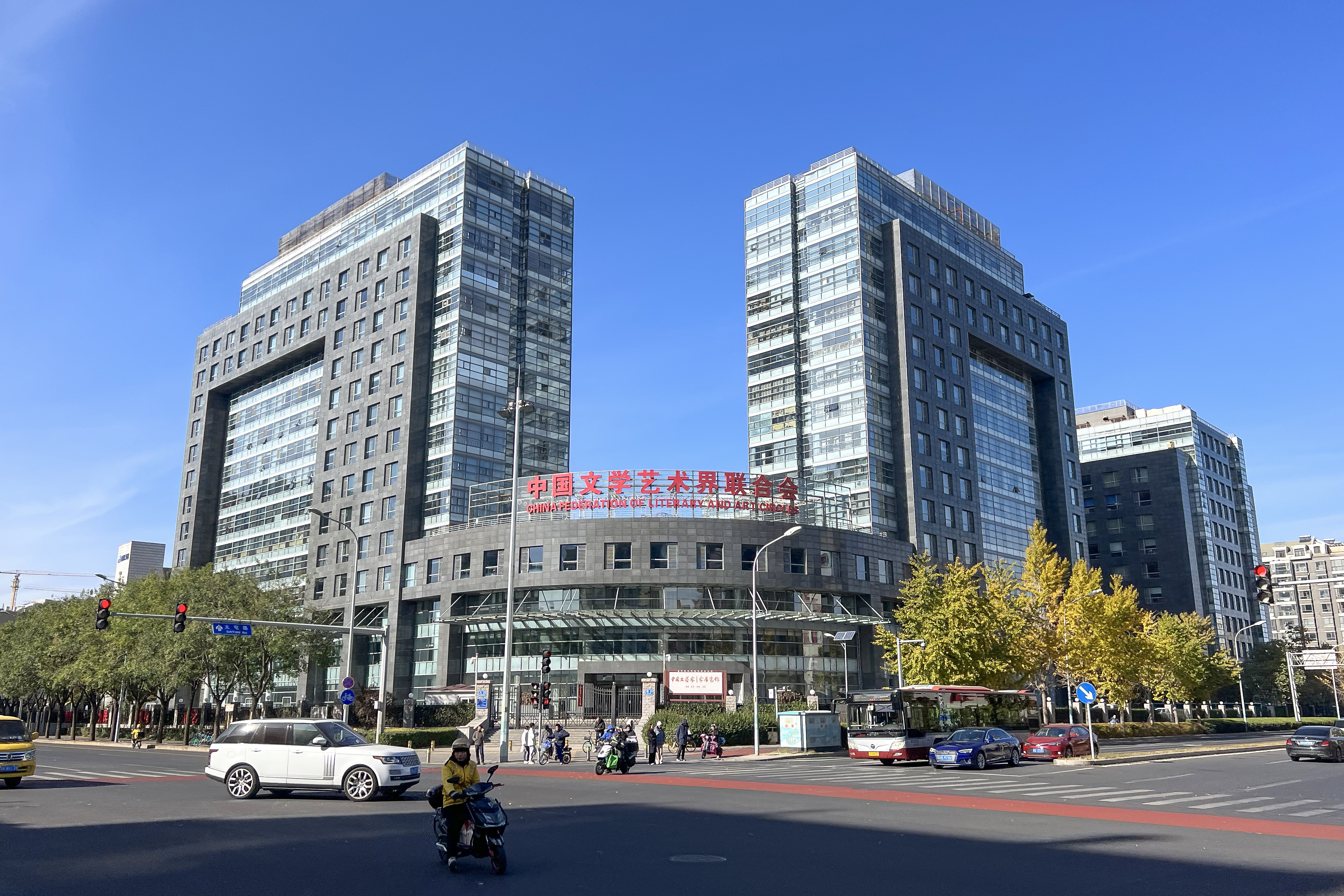
Headquarters

The Chinese Musicians Association (Chinese: 中国音乐家协会; pinyin: Zhōngguó Yīnyuèjiā Xiéhuì; abbreviated CMA) is China's largest and most important musical organization. It was established in July 1949 by the Chinese Communist Party and, as of 2020, has more than 15,600 individual members.

According to its website, the association's responsibilities include "contact, coordination, and service". The association promotes new musical composition, organizes music competitions, provides rewards and commendations for prominent musical contributions, and sponsors musical research. It also carries out musical exchange between China and other countries including introducing Chinese music to the world, bringing internationally acclaimed musicians and music groups to China and selecting Chinese musicians to participate in international music competitions. In political terms, the organization serves as "a bridge and bond between the Party and government and the music industry."

The CMA publishes several professional periodicals and publishes audio and video recordings.

The CMA maintains nine specialized committees and a number of secondary academic societies. The association's subordinate organizations include the Chinese Traditional Music Society, Chinese National Orchestral Music society, Chinese Ethnic Minorities Vocal Music Society, Chinese Musical Aesthetics Society, Chinese Musical Literature Society, Nie Er, and Xian Xinghai Society.

The CMA is a member of the International Music Council and JMI (www.JMI.org).
