= Yellow River Piano Concerto =

Piano concerto

The Yellow River Piano Concerto (simplified Chinese: 黄河钢琴协奏曲; traditional Chinese: 黃河鋼琴協奏曲; pinyin: Huáng Hé gāngqín xiézòuqǔ) is a piano concerto arranged by a collaboration between Chinese composers, including Yin Chengzong and Chu Wanghua, and based on the Yellow River Cantata by composer Xian Xinghai. It was originally directed by Jiang Qing, the fourth wife of Mao Zedong, and since its highly acclaimed premiere in 1970 during the Cultural Revolution the Concerto has become popular in China and around the globe. It is noted for its revolutionary theme that integrates a classic post-romantic music structure with passion, beauty and power, along with highly skilled solo phases. The piano concerto is meant to represent the very fighting spirit of Chinese people and the determination of a new-born nation, in the context of a long, vividly struggling history of the Yellow River.

== Background ==
Xian Xinghai wrote the Yellow River Cantata at Yan'an in 1939, allegedly in a cave in just six days, during the Sino-Japanese War (1937–1945). It is an eight-movement piece in which he used traditional folk-melodies and evoked the image of the Yellow River as a symbol of Chinese defiance against the Japanese invaders. During his stay in Russia, he edited and re-orchestrated the work, which was later modified by Li Huanzhi, Qu Wei, and Yan Liangkun. This edition aimed at furthering the energy and momentum of the music, and in this light the rearrangement of the Yellow River Piano Concerto thirty years later is merely a continuation of that same practice.

Since the establishment of the People's Republic of China, Xian Xinghai together with Nie Er (who wrote the Chinese national anthem, the "March of the Volunteers") were regarded by Mao Zedong and Zhou Enlai as "the people's musicians" and were the most prestigious composers of the PRC. Yet, even the Yellow River Cantata was banned from performance during the Cultural Revolution (1966–1976); the Central Philharmonic Orchestra was forbidden to perform any Western orchestral pieces and its professional musicians were left with nothing to do. Under such circumstances, the pianist Yin Chengzong loaded his piano onto a truck and drove it to Tiananmen Square to accompany revolutionary songs that were sung at the time. He caught the eye of Jiang, who commissioned Yin to write a piano reduction of The Legend of the Red Lantern. Pleased with the result, Jiang authorised a collective of musicians from the Central Philharmonic Society to rearrange the cantata into a piano concerto. Some of its members included Yin Chengzong (殷承宗), Liu Zhuang (刘庄), Chu Wanghua (储望华), Sheng Lihong (盛礼洪), Shi Shucheng (石叔诚), and Xu Feixing (许斐星). The resulting concerto has a four movement structure:

1. Prelude: The Song of the Yellow River Boatmen (黄河船夫曲)
2. Ode To the Yellow River (黄河頌)
3. The Yellow River In Anger (黄河憤)
4. Defend the Yellow River (保衛黄河)

Upon hearing the first draft, Jiang requested that the work be made more politically explicit. After her feedback was incorporated, a score of the concerto was approved for publication (1970). To make its program explicit to the listeners, this score contains subtitles detailing the intended interpretation of each section, which were displayed during its performances. Later editions of the score, published after the Cultural Revolution, removed these subtitles.

With the end of the Cultural Revolution in 1976, the Yellow River Piano Concerto was banished from the Chinese concert stage, retaining a certain popularity outside China. Nevertheless, by the late 1980s it was filtering back into the Chinese musical mainstream, usually in the form of new performing editions, new recordings, and live performances by Chinese and Western artists. Apart from changes in the orchestration, the main differences between the various editions have been what the editors have done with the anthems integrated in the finale. For example, Shi Shucheng revised the score to replace the anthems with additional material from the Yellow River Cantata, claiming that they were not part of the concerto's score as originally envisioned, and that it had been Jiang Qing who imposed their inclusion as a condition to authorise the work's premiere.

== Summary ==
=== I. Prelude: The Song of the Yellow River Boatman ===
"The Song of the Yellow River Boatmen" describes the momentum of the terrifying waves of the Yellow River and uses the rapid chromatic crescendo and long rolls of the timpani and cymbals typical of the eight model plays model operas.

=== II. Ode to the Yellow River ===
The original heroic tenor solo melody of the "Ode to the Yellow River" is sung in praise of the history and presence of the Yellow River, signifying the cultural pride of the Chinese. This broad Chinese recitative is supported by the deep and rich timbre of the cello, and is considered as an example of the nationalistic style. Before the coda, the opening motif from the Chinese National Anthem is included in the trombone part.

=== III. The Wrath of the Yellow River ===
"The Wrath of the Yellow River", originally sung by a soprano solo, begins with a dizi solo accompanied by the piano. This melody appears inspired by the Jiangnan melody of the Butterfly Lovers' Violin Concerto, but rewritten in the style of northwest Shanbei folk idioms. In the third movement, the piano brings out the melody taken from the "Ballad of the Yellow Rivers", originally a mellow number sung by female chorus. We then hear the "Lament at the Yellow River" taking over for this movement.

=== IV. Defend the Yellow River ===
As the finale of this piano concerto, the theme is arranged into a polyphonic canon. It is also apparent that the tune from "The East is Red" is persistent throughout the entire movement; among the various versions of the Yellow River Concerto that are currently in circulation, including Yin Chengzong's film recording, we can hear a recapitulation of the theme of "Defending the Yellow River" played canonically against the strings after the climatic tutti of "The East is Red". Then the first phrase of "The East is Red" is played by the trumpet, and tightly followed by the final phrase of the "Internationale", as an example of thematic writing huan wei (換尾; literally "Changing the end") that is often found in traditional Chinese music.

== Instrumentation ==
The concerto is scored for a solo piano and orchestra of piccolo, dizi (Chinese flute), 2 flutes, 2 oboes, 2 clarinets (in B-flat), 2 bassoons, 4 horns (in F), 2 trumpets (in B-flat), 3 trombones, timpani, triangle, cymbals (suspended), harp, pipa (though not all editions of the score show this), and strings.

== Notable recordings ==
- Ingrid Sala Santamaria with National Philharmonic Orchestra in the Philippines guest-conducted by the American Maestro Guy Taylor.
- Ilana Vered pianist with National Philharmonic Orchestra conducted by Elgar Howarth
- Xiang-Dong Kong pianist with China Philharmonic Orchestra conducted by Mak Ka Lok
- Lang Lang pianist with China Philharmonic Orchestra conducted by Long Yu
- Yundi Li pianist with China NCPA Concert Hall Orchestra conducted by Zuochuang Chen
- Shi Shucheng pianist with Central Philharmonic Society of China conducted by Han Zhongjie
- Yin Chengzong pianist with Czecho-Slovak Radio Symphony Orchestra conducted by Adrian Leaper
- Daniel Epstein pianist with The Philadelphia Orchestra conducted by Eugene Ormandy

== Historical performances ==
- The Filipina pianist Ingrid Sala Santamaria who premiered the Yellow River Concerto in 1975 at the Cultural Center of the Philippines (CCP) with the National Philharmonic Orchestra (NPO) guest-conducted by the American Maestro Guy Taylor.
- The Austrian-Taiwanese pianist Ruei-Bin Chen was the designated soloist who performed the Yellow River Concerto at the Expo 2010, with Shanghai Chinese Orchestra conducted by Wang Fujian.
- The Chinese pianist Lang Lang performed the fourth movement of the Yellow River Concerto at the 2008 Summer Olympics Countdown Event in Tiananmen Square.

== See also ==
- Chinese orchestra
