= Daniel Epstein =

Daniel Epstein is the name of:

- Daniel Epstein (pianist) (born 1946), American pianist
- Daniel Mark Epstein (born 1948), poet and biographer
- Daniel Z. Epstein, American lawyer
