= Wang Jianzhong =

Chinese composer and pianist (1933–2016)

- Traditional Chinese: 王建中
- Simplified Chinese: 王建中
- Literal meaning: King Builds China
Transcriptions
Standard Mandarin
- Hanyu Pinyin: Wáng Jiànzhōng
- Yale Romanization: Wáng Jyàn-Jūng

Wang Jianzhong

Wang Jianzhong (Chinese: 王建中; 1933–2016) was a Chinese composer, pianist, and educator. His works, many of them composed during the Cultural Revolution, bridge Chinese folk music and Western classical piano tradition and have made him a household name in his own country. His A Hundred Birds Paying Homage to the Phoenix is considered one of the six representative twentieth-century Chinese piano masterpieces.

== Biography ==
Wang was born in Shanghai in 1933. His parents were from Jiangyin and Zhejiang Province. He began his piano study at the age of 10. In 1950, he was accepted into the Shanghai Conservatory of Music where he majored in composition and piano. In 1958, after his graduation, he became a professor at the conservatory. During the 1970s he served as the composer-in-residence for the Central Philharmonic Orchestra. He returned to the Shanghai Conservatory in the 1980s where he served as an associate professor, professor, associate chair, and associate dean. Among his students there were the pianists Haochen Zhang, Peng-Peng Gong and Jenny Q. Chai and the composer Bright Sheng. Wang died in Santa Fe, New Mexico, in 2016.

== Works ==
Wang composed a large body of works for piano based on themes from Chinese folk music during the 1960s and 1970s, when the Cultural Revolution forbade compositions which were not based on either traditional Chinese folk melodies or revolutionary songs. Towards the end of that period, the restrictions became slightly more relaxed, and Wang, like his contemporary Li Yinghai, began to base his compositions on Chinese court music as well. The popularity of Wang's compositions continued after the bans on contemporary and Western music were lifted at the end of the Cultural Revolution. According to China Daily, his works are valued for the insight they provide into "the dilemma faced by Wang's generation of Chinese composers during a time of great social turmoil." His piano works include:

- Red Flag Canal 红旗渠畔 (piano concerto, collaborating with Shi Wanchun). Premiered at the 8th Shanghai Spring International Music Festival in 1978, with Piano Solo Li Mingqiang and Shanghai Orchestra conducted by Hou Runyu.
- Liuyang River 浏阳河. Based on a folk song of Hunan Province composed by Tang Biguang.
- Silver Clouds Chasing the Moon 彩云追月 (also known as The Moon Chased by the Colourful Clouds). Adapted from a piece by Ren Guang and Nie Er.
- A Hundred Birds Paying Respect to the Phoenix 百鸟朝凤. This piece, composed by Wang in 1973, is based on melodies from the Shandong, Anhui, Henan, and Hebei provinces of East China. They were originally arranged for the suona, a Chinese wind instrument, by the renowned suona player, Ren Tongxiang (born 1927). Considered one of the six representative twentieth-century Chinese piano masterpieces and exemplifying his ability to integrate the ornamental tones, chromaticism, and pentatonic scales of traditional Chinese music with Western piano tradition, Wang's version remains very popular in China and has been the subject of several critical commentaries by Chinese musicologists.
- Four Northern Shaanxi Folk Songs 陕北民歌四首, including Red Lilies Crimson and Bright 山丹丹花开红艳艳, The Armymen and People Join in the Production Drive 军民大生产, Embroiding a Portrait of Chairman Mao in Gold 绣金匾 and Joy of Emancipation 翻身道情. This suite was first performed by Yin Chengzong and recorded in 1974.
- Three Variations of the Plum Blossom Melody 梅花三弄. Composed in 1973, the work is based on a piece from the Tang dynasty (618 – 907 A.D.) and was originally composed for the Guqin, a seven-stringed instrument of the zither family.
- Five Yunnan Folk Songs 云南民歌五首. Composed in 1958. Performed by Li Yundi in his 2008 concert at Carnegie Hall.
- Evening Song of a Fishing Boat. Dedicated to William Goldenberg, Chair of the Piano Department of Northern Illinois University, the piece received its world premiere in 2013 in a concert at Carnegie Hall by Yao Lin.

His works for strings include String Quartet in A Major (recorded in 1985), and a violin sonata composed in 1984.

Besides, he also wrote lots of piano accompaniment for published mass songs during the 1960s and 1970s.
