= Ange Zhang =

Chinese-born Canadian illustrator and animation artist

- 张安戈
- Born: March 19, 1951 (age 75); Beijing, China
- Citizenship: Canadian
- Education: Central Academy of Drama; Banff Centre
- Occupations: Illustrator, animation artist
- Spouse: Pingna Sheng
- Children: 1
- Father: Guang Weiran
- Website: sites.google.com/site/angezhang/

Ange Zhang (Chinese: 张安戈; pinyin: Zhāng Āngē; born March 19, 1951) is a Chinese-born Canadian illustrator and animation artist.

The son of Guang Weiran, a famous Chinese writer, he was born in Beijing and studied at the Central Academy of Drama in China and the Banff Centre in Canada. Zhang grew up during the Cultural Revolution. He joined the Red Guard but was later sent to a farm in Shanxi province. There he discovered painting and drawing. He later worked as a set designer for the National Opera Theatre in Beijing. Zhang was working as a set designer at the Banff Centre for the Arts at the time of the Tiananmen Square protests of 1989. The Canadian government offered asylum to visitors from China at that time and Zhang decided to accept that offer. He holds Canadian citizenship.

While he was working on set design for the Stratford Festival, he met Ken Nutt at a drawing class in Stratford. Nutt suggested that he try illustrating children's books. That led to him illustrating W. D. Valgardson's book Thor, which won a Mr. Christie's Book Award.

He married Pingna Sheng; the couple have one son Eric.

== Selected work ==
- To the Mountains (1995) text by Diana Wieler
- The Fishing Summer (1997) text by Teddy Jam (pseudonym for Matt Cohen)
- Red Land, Yellow River: A Story from the Cultural Revolution (2004), finalist for the Norma Fleck Award and for the Governor General's Award for English-language children's literature and winner of the Bologna Ragazzi award for young adult non-fiction at the Bologna Children's Book Fair
