= The Columbia Anthology of Modern Chinese Drama =

First edition

The Columbia Anthology of Modern Chinese Drama is a 2010 book edited and introduced by Xiaomei Chen (simplified Chinese: 陈小眉; traditional Chinese: 陳小眉; pinyin: Chén Xiǎoméi) and published by the Columbia University Press.

There are 22 plays, including huaju and comedies. The time span of the plays ranges from 1919 to 2000. About half of the plays were published before the 1980s, including five plays from the Maoist era and seven from the 1920s. One of the Maoist plays is a Cultural Revolution-era model opera drama. In terms of the political era, 11 are from the Republican Era and the remainder are from after the start of the People's Republic of China in 1949. Of the remainder, eight are from Mainland China, two are from British Hong Kong prior to the 1997 handover, and one is from Taiwan. Four of the plays had previously been published in the 1983 anthology Twentieth-century Chinese Drama: An Anthology by Edward Gunn.

Translators of the plays include Brenda Austin, Amy Dooling, Edward Gunn, Nick Kaldis, Jonathan S. Noble, John Weinstein, and Shiao-ling Yu. Taiwanese author Stan Lai and Hong Kong author Joanne Chan had written and provided the English translations of their respective works. Some translations had originated in earlier works and were modified. Mary Mazzilli of The China Quarterly wrote that "This adds a contemporary flavour to the texts without detracting from the meaning and style from the originals."

== Content ==
The introduction, an overview of the genre, places the plays in chronological order and describes the role of huaju in politics and culture. This introduction includes citations and endnotes. Kevin J. Wetmore, Jr. of Loyola Marymount University stated that even though using an individual introduction to each work would have allowed the inclusion of production histories and biographical information of the playwrights, "that is the tradeoff for the bigger picture presented by the comprehensive introduction aimed at general readers and students."

Plays included in the 2010 unabridged version of the anthology:

- The Main Event in Life (1919) by Hu Shih
- Yama Zhao (1922) by Hong Shen
- The Night the Tiger Was Caught (1922-1923) by Tian Han
- A Wasp (1923) by Ding Xilin
- After Returning Home (1923) by Ouyang Yuqian
- Oppression (1925) by Ding Xilin
- Breaking Out of Ghost Pagoda (1928) by Bai Wei
- Thunderstorm (1934) by Cao Yu
  - Wetmore stated that this inclusion was "I believe, for the first time" the play Thunderstorm was included in an anthology.
- It's only Spring (1937) by Lin Jianwu
- Under Shanghai Eaves (1937) by Xia Yan
- Return on a Snowy Night (1942) by Wu Zuguang
- Teahouse (1958) by Lao She
- Guan Hanqing (1958) by Tian Han
- The Young Generation (1965) by Chen Yun
- The Legend of the Red Lantern (Cultural Revolution era)
- Bus Stop (1983) by Gao Xingjian
- Metamorphosis (1986) by Anthony Chan (Hong Kong play)
- Crown Ourselves with Roses (1988) by Joanne Chan
- Wilderness and Man (1988) by Li Longyun
- Secret Love in Peach Blossom Land by Stan Lai (Taiwanese work)
- Geologists (1995) by Yang Limin
- Che Guevara (2000) by Huang Jisu, Zhang Guantian, and Shen Lin

This book includes the first-ever English versions of A Wasp, Che Guevara, and Geologists. The 2014 paperback version, described as an "Abridged Edition", includes 13 plays: The Main Event in Life, The Night the Tiger Was Caught, After Returning Home, A Wasp, Breaking Out of Ghost Pagoda, Thunderstorm, Under Shanghai Eaves, Teahouse, Guan Hanqing, The Young Generation, The Legend of the Red Lantern, Bus Stop, and Sha Yexin's Jiang Qing and Her Husbands (1990).

== Reception ==
Wetmore referred to Chen's statement in the introduction, her desire that the book "will inspire other scholars, students, and general readers to explore the richness of Chinese theatre", and wrote himself that he "hopes it will, too, and believes it can." Wetmore added that the English translations "read well and also perform well" and that "speaking as both a teacher and director of Asian theatre these translations are eminently playable in English." Wetmore was unable to read or speak Mandarin or Cantonese, so therefore he chose not to comment on any accuracy of the translations. Wetmore advocated for the release of a softcover version that may be more economical for individual students.

Faye Chunfang Fei, Professor of English and Drama at East China Normal University, referred to the anthology as "by far the most monumental attempt to bring together dramatic texts of China's modern huaju in English translation." Fei said notable works by Guo Shixing and Sha Yexin are excluded, but still stated that "Chen's selection is excellent". Reviewing the abridged edition, Xing Fan of University of Toronto wrote that "the thirteen plays offer the reader a nuanced, rich, and dynamic picture of modern Chinese drama: they [...] embrace both those of enduring popularity and the rarely staged, lesser known, and they comprise a variety of" genres. The reviewer also praised the introduction as highly informative.
