= Liu Zhuang =

Liu Zhuang may refer to:

- Emperor Ming of Han (28–75), Chinese emperor of the Han Dynasty
- Liu Zhuang (musician) (1932–2011), Chinese musician
