= Production Cantata =

The Production Cantata (Chinese: 生产大合唱; pinyin: Shengchan Dahechang, also 生产运动大合唱; Shengchan Yundong Dahechang) is a cantata by Chinese composer Xian Xinghai (1905–1945) (冼星海). Composed in Yan'an in early 1939 during the Second Sino-Japanese War, the work is a setting of patriotic texts by Chen Bingjun.

== Historical background ==
The work was premiered on 24 March 1939 in the Shanbei Gongxue Hall of Yan'an, conducted by the composer. The Production Cantata was originally conceived as a three movement staged tableau with costume. After the first performance, an additional movement was interpolated between the second and third movement of the original version to create a four movement work. This final version was subsequently performed in the early 1940s at the Lu Xun Academy of Fine Arts.

Upon receiving request from the Communist leadership to produce works that would galvanize people's support for the major offensive battle taking place in 1939, Xian completed his first opera March of the Army and the People in January 1939, followed by two cantatas, the Production Cantata, which premiered on 24 March 1939, and the Yellow River Cantata, which was first performed four weeks later on 13 April. The Production Cantata clearly shows Xian's considerable progress at coming to know “China's situation”. Xian worked with the librettist Chen Bingjun (陈秉钧), who was known by his nom de guerre Sai Ke (塞克) meaning “the Bolshevik”. Sai Ke was another of Xian's colleagues who had acquired renown as a playwright and lyricist in the South China Society. Librettist and composer produced a secular cantata centered on the seasonal cycle of peasant life and correlated their daily life growing crops to the 8th Route Army's battle against the enemy.

== Musical influence ==
Although Huang Zi's setting of Chang Hen Ge for chorus and piano was written in 1933, the Production Cantata is the first work by a Chinese composer for chorus and orchestra, and accordingly can be claimed as China's first large-scale choral-symphonic work. Production Cantata is all the more noteworthy in this regard, as the orchestra used is an ensemble of Chinese instruments (with the bass line augmented by cellos and basses), rather than an ensemble of western instruments. Xian Xinghai's student Li Huanzhi assisted with the orchestrations. Liu Wenjin also had input into the orchestration of the third movement.

The Production Cantata's second movement begins with the tune Er Yue Li Lai (二月里来). This melody was an instant hit, and remains a permanent fixture of Chinese musical life. The tune demonstrates Xian Xinghai's genius as a melodist. His ability, on display throughout this work and his other compositions, to craft melodies that echo Chinese folk music and thus obtain an instant emotional response from Chinese listeners can be compared to **Tchaikovsky's ability in the same field.

== Structure ==
The Production Cantata consists of four movements that unfold through the seasonal farming cycle.

The first movement, Spring Plowing, begins with thunderous Chinese drums that recall itinerant music troupes announcing their arrival in the countryside to attract peasants to their performances. The percussion then segues to folk melodies played on a combination of plucked and bowed Chinese instruments, before progressing to solemnly soaring music that captures the sacred nature of the rituals for opening the spring earth for planting, a commoner's ritual that came to be celebrated in imperial ceremonies for thousands of years. The peasant audience would have been excited to hear their work cries and vocabulary in the ornate choral arrangement. The first movement rises to equate the labour of farmers with the valour and courage of the peasant army, a connection that would not have been apparent to farmers in generations past. Sai Ke's lyrics dispensed with older customs of opaque couplets in classical Chinese so that the content of music reflected reality – the thoughts, feeling and lives of the countryside.

The second movement, Planting, commences with lion dance percussion followed by the melody Er Yue Li Lai, a lieder celebrating the sowing of seeds and the karmic reward of such work in terms of sustenance for life. The lyrics call to the farmers to rise above the age-old curse of petty factionalism and embrace unity. The second section returns to a percussive segment that replicate the rhythms of soldiers on the march and then builds to a folk idiom where the tempo ever increases, suggesting the storm of a guerrilla assault on the enemy.

The third movement, Harvest, juxtaposes blocks of material taken from folk music, weaving work cries in accelerating calls to reap the harvest and thereby defeat an invader that is hopelessly bound to fail. The choir lapses into hearty laughter at completing the enemy's impossible task, a tweaking of the nose of the Japanese imperial “superman.”

The fourth movement, The Abundant Year, releases the tension of the prior movement through its celebration of the harvest and the satisfaction felt by the peasants at the fruits of their labour. Xian and Sai Ke bring the peasant audience further into the composition through their musical and lyrical wit, reproducing the sounds of livestock in whimsical innovations and building to exultant exclamation of the invincibility of a new China. The Cantata ends as a monument to a revival of a great civilization shorn of the straitjacket of faux Confucian restraints and grounded in the celebration of ordinary people.

== Performances and recordings ==
After its initial performances, the second movement of the Cantata became popular, but the work as a whole did not enter the mainstream repertory and full performances were rare, possibly because the chorus parts are significantly more difficult to sing than those of the subsequent Yellow River Cantata.

In 2015, the work was revived by Nicholas Michael Smith, who performed it with the International Festival Chorus of Beijing and Peking Sinfonietta. Smith subsequently recorded the work with the International Festival Chorus of Beijing, the Baroque Chamber Chorus of Beijing, the Beijing No. 80 Middle School Choir and Peking Sinfonietta. This is currently the only available recording of the Production Cantata.
