= Yellow River Cantata =

Cantata by Sinn Sing Hoi

- by Xian Xinghai
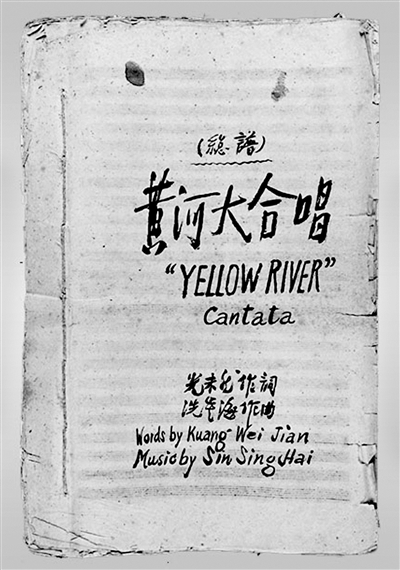
- Original score
- Native name: Chinese: 黄河大合唱; pinyin: Huánghé Dàhéchàng
- Year: 1939
- Period: 20th-century classical music
- Genre: Cantata
- Text: Yellow River by Guang Weiran
- Language: Chinese
- Composed: 26 March 1939 – 31 March 1939:
- Published: 1939 (Xian Xinghai); 1940 (ed. Xian Xinghai); (ed. Li Huanzhi); (ed. Yan Liangkun)
- Movements: 7 to 9
- Vocal: Full SATB choir; Solo: bass, tenor, baritone, soprano
- Instrumental: Western orchestra, some Chinese instruments

Premiere
- Date: April 13, 1939
- Location: Shanbei Gongxue Hall, Yan'an, Republic of China
- Conductor: Wu Xiling
- Performers: Choir of 40 people, orchestra

The Yellow River Cantata (Chinese: 黄河大合唱; pinyin: Huánghé Dàhéchàng) is a cantata by Chinese composer Xian Xinghai (1905–1945). Composed in Yan'an in early 1939 during the Second Sino-Japanese War, the work was inspired by a patriotic poem by Guang Weiran, which was also adapted as the lyrics. Premiered on April 13 of the same year in the Shanbei Gongxue Hall of Yan'an, the work soon spread to all parts of China.

== Historical background ==
According to official accounts by the Chinese Communist Party, after the Chinese city of Wuhan fell to Japanese invaders in November 1938 during the Second Sino-Japanese War, the poet Guang Weiran led the 3rd Squad of the Anti-Enemy Troupe across the Yellow River near the Hukou Waterfall and eastwards into the communist anti-Japanese headquarters in the Lüliang Mountains. During his journey, he witnessed the local boatmen battle against heavy gales and torrential waves, and heard their spirit-lifting songs.

Upon reaching Yan'an in January 1939, Guang wrote a patriotic poem entitled Yellow River and recited it during the Chinese New Year celebration. The poem spoke of the oppression of Chinese people under the invaders and called for all to take up arms to defend China. Xian Xinghai, who received his education at the Conservatoire de Paris and returned to China in 1935, was also present at the recital. He went on to write a cantata based on the poem.

According to an account by Xian's daughter, he began work on the composition on March 26, and took merely four days to complete all eight movements. However, he was not satisfied with the second and sixth, which he took two more days to amend. Two weeks later, the cantata premiered in the Shanbei Gongxue Hall in Yan'an, performed by a forty-strong choir and a primitive orchestra conducted by Wu Xiling. It soon spread to many parts of China to inspire its listeners to participate in the war efforts against Imperial Japan.

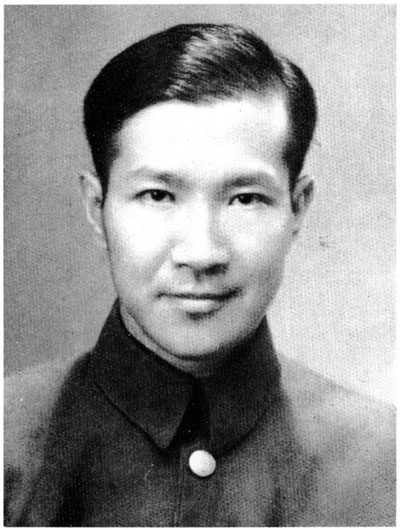
Xian Xinghai, the composer of ''Yellow River Cantata''

== Musical influence ==
The Yellow River Cantata laid the ground for Chinese contemporary large-scaled vocal music composition. In the late 1960s, it was adapted into a piano concerto entitled the Yellow River Piano Concerto by the pianist Yin Chengzong. This arrangement, together with the violin concerto Liang Zhu by He Zhanhao and Chen Gang, are the two best internationally known musical works that combined source materials that are purely Chinese with Western music methodology.

== Versions ==
There are altogether four different versions of the Yellow River Cantata that had been performed in public. The first was the initial composition by Xian Xinghai while in Yan'an. Accommodations were made for the lack of musical instruments at that time, as the orchestra consisted of only the violin, Chinese flute, harmonica, sanxian, erhu and dahu, along with a few percussion instruments.

A year after Xian departed for the Soviet Union in 1940, he amended his composition for performance by a fully equipped Western orchestra, aided by a few Chinese ethnic instruments. He also made some amendments to the choral arrangement. In addition, a prologue was added, increasing the number of movements to nine.

The third and fourth revisions were respectively made by Xian's students, Li Huanzhi and Yan Liangkun. Li simplified the "Soviet" version for performance by the Shanghai Symphony Orchestra, while Yan incorporated the prologue into the first movement to return the cantata to its initial arrangement of eight movements (with the first as the overture) for performance by the Central Orchestra during the 1980s. Yan also made heavy amendments to the third movement, "The Yellow River Descends from Heaven", such that the new melody was vastly different from the original. This last revision became the most played and heard version today.

== Current arrangement ==
The current arrangement of the Yellow River Cantata contains eight movements. However, most performances before 1987 only used seven, omitting the third. The cantata is meant to be performed by a full western orchestra with some Chinese instruments, and a full SATB choir. Soloists include a bass in the second movement, a tenor and baritone in the fifth, and a soprano in the sixth. There is also a male speaker, who recites various political exhortations at the beginning of each movement.

The arrangement from the original is as follows:

1. Song of the Yellow River Boatmen
2. Ode to the Yellow River
3. The Yellow River Descends from Heaven
4. Ballad of the Yellow River
5. Singing on the Banks of the Yellow River
6. Lament of the Yellow River
7. Defend the Yellow River
8. The Roaring Yellow River

An overture section was added in 1941 during Xian Xinghai's time in the Soviet Union.

== Trivia ==
- According to an account by Xian Xinghai's daughter, Guang Weiran knew Xian was Cantonese and had a sweet tooth. Guang then asked someone to buy a kilogram of sugar, a scarcity during wartime, and gave it to Xian, who ate it for snacks while composing the cantata.
- Due to the lack of musical instruments, the orchestra for the premiere of the Yellow River Cantata consisted of only two or three violins and twenty-odd Chinese ethnic musical instruments. The rest were products of innovation: diesel barrels for bass strings and washbasins for percussion.
- Mao Zedong, who was then Chairman of the Central Military Commission of the Chinese Communist Party leading the anti-Japanese resistance in Yan'an, was also present during the premiere.

== See also ==
- Production Cantata
- Yellow River Piano Concerto, piano concerto adaptation of the Yellow River Cantata by Yin Chengzong.
