= Peng-Peng Gong =

Chinese classical composer and pianist (b. 1992)

Peng-Peng Gong (Chinese: 龚天鹏), formerly known as his stage name Peng Peng, is a Chinese classical composer and pianist born on July 3, 1992. Described by The Washington Post as an artist "with the confidence of a weathered veteran and a welcome unbridled quality to his playing", he has established himself as one of the most gifted young artists of his generation. At 18, he has become an internationally active concert pianist and a six-time American Society of Composers, Authors and Publishers National Award-winning composer in consecutive years since 2006. He was among the youngest pianists to be officially signed to the artist roster of the renowned Opus 3 Artists (formerly ICM Artists) in 2007 at age 14, and the youngest composer to be signed by the [Lauren Keiser Music Publishing] in 2009 at age 16. Since 2005, he concertized and toured intensely in the North America, South America, Europe, and China, appearing in over a hundred solo and orchestral engagements. He was invited twice, on personal request, by House Speaker Nancy Pelosi to perform for the United States Congress.

== Early life ==
Gong was born in Nanjing in July 1992 and was recognized in his hometown as a rare child prodigy. At age one, he was found humming all the tunes that were sung to him with precise accuracy, just before he was able to identify exact pitches of chords played on the piano at age two, a result of absolute pitch. He began officially studying piano performance at age five with renowned professor Huifang Ye, and won the Jiangsu Province Grand Prodigy Prize at age six in 1999. In April 2001, the eight-year-old earned a first-place audition result and was accepted to the Shanghai Conservatory of Music's Primary School, studying under pianists Jianzhong Wang and Zhijue Chao. After the acceptance he won First Prize at the China's National Youth Piano Competition at age 9, just right before he auditioned for Juilliard School's Pre-college Division and was accepted by the jury within the same afternoon, describing the child as "the most remarkable young artist we've came across in ten years." When visa became a problem, two letters each from Yo-Yo Ma and Hillary Clinton arrived at the consulate to recommend his entry.

== Years in the United States ==
Since then he began studying with the famed pianist Yoheved Kaplinsky, who is the chairperson of Juilliard's piano department and the Artistic Director of its Pre-college Division. Simultaneously, he studied composition with Dr. Andrew Thomas. He then won the division's 2003-2004 Piano Competition, the 2004-05 Composition Competition, first prize at the New Jersey International Music Competition, and the 2005-06 Piano competition that awarded him the concert to debut at Lincoln Center with Itzhak Perlman conducting the division's symphony orchestra, until his big conclusion at the Juilliard Centennial Gala which PBS gave a national live broadcast on Live from Lincoln Center. It was then that he attracted the interest of Opus 3 Artists the same talent agency where Yo-Yo Ma, Christopher Plummer, Midori, and Radu Lupu, to name a few, currently employs.

=== Performing highlights ===
Among the most prestigious engagements was his appearance as guest soloist to a National Live PBS Broadcast at The Juilliard School's 100 Years Centennial Gala alongside composer John Williams, actor Kevin Kline, violinist Itzhak Perlman, soprano Renée Fleming, jazz composer Wynton Marsalis, and pianist Emanuel Ax where he concluded the grand finale playing Rachmaninoff's Second Piano Concerto in 2006 at age 13. Other major highlights include his guest appearance at the U.S. National Symphony's 2007 Season Opening Gala under the baton of former music director Leonard Slatkin, with whom he was invited as guest soloist in the 2007 American Symphony Orchestra League's Annual concert and the 2010 Season Conclusion with the Detroit Symphony Orchestra. He was engaged several times between 2005 and 2007 to perform on NPR and accepted invitations by the renowned San Francisco, the U.S. National Symphony, the China National Symphony, the Brazilian National Symphony, the Dominican Republic National Symphony, the RTV Slovenia Symphony, The Detroit Symphony, the Taipei Chinese Orchestra, The Jacksonville Symphony, The Philharmonique de Nice France, The Norwalk Symphony, The Nashua Symphony, The California Symphony, the Corpus Christi Symphony, the East Texas Symphony, the Cedar Rapids Symphony Orchestra, the Aspen Festival Orchestra, The Bowdoin Festival Orchestra, The Juilliard Orchestra, the St. Lukes Orchestra, the Nashville Symphony, the San Diego Symphony, the Orlando Philharmonic, the Big Spring Symphony, and the Midland-Odessa Symphony among numerous others. His performance at the 2007 American Symphony Orchestra League was recorded and released live by Naxos Records, and Channel Classics Records will release his debut album of his performances of standard and original compositions. Aside from these orchestral engagements, he has played a major amount of solo recitals in cities including New York, Washington D.C., Beijing, Boston, San Diego, Paris, Baltimore, Kansas City, Key West, Greenwich, Cincinnati, Sarasota, San Jose, St. Louis, Orlando, Nanking, Shijiazhuang, Zhengzhou, and Qingdao. Future appearances, including concerts in San Jose's Santa Clara University Concert Hall, Beijing's National Grand Theatre, France's Nice Philharmonic, and Beijing Modern Music Festival, makes his concert schedule extend to 2013, ending the season in a thirty-concert tour throughout the United States with the China National Symphony Orchestra.

=== Composing and educational highlights ===
As a composer, his First Symphony (2008) was nominated for the 2011 Hollywood Music in Media Awards, and the same work won the 2010 IBLA Grand Prize of Italy. His orchestral and chamber works won him six ASCAP Morton Gould Young Composer Awards in consecutive years since 2006, among them he earned the top prize of the Young Composer category. Within the last two years he has published four large-scale symphonies distributed by Hal Leonard Corporation, the largest sheet music corporation in the world. Thus far, he completed two one-hour symphonies, three large-scale piano concertos, six symphonic overtures, chamber music, art songs, and solo piano repertoire. His symphonic poem, Hourly Reminiscence, based on Kate Chopin's story of the same name, won the 2010 Juilliard Orchestral Prize and was premiered by himself and Maestro Jeffrey Milarsky conducting the Juilliard Orchestra at New York's Lincoln Center.

Conductors Michel Plasson, director of the Dresden Philharmonic and the China National Symphony Orchestra, En Shao, principal guest conductor of the China National Symphony and the Macau Orchestra, and Leonard Slatkin, began to notice his style of performance and his deep emotional sensitivity both as pianist and as a composer. Aside from performing and composing, he is the youngest known scholar of Austrian composer Gustav Mahler and his analysis of these works was profound that he was invited to give scholarly lectures at the National Center of Performing Arts in Beijing, guiding students and music lovers in detail throughout the works of the 19th and 20th centuries. He is obtaining a Bachelor of Music Degree under the guidance of composer Samuel Adler, and conductor Adam Glaser at Juilliard.

== Works ==
=== Piano ===
- Three Fantasies (2003)
- Concert Etudes (2003)
- Sonata in G minor (2003 - Lost)
- "Fog" (2004)
- Waltzes (2005)
- "Immortal Struggle" (2006) - Winner of the 2007 ASCAP Charlotte V. Bergen Prize
- Transcription on Ravel's La Valse
- Rhapsody in Three Movements (2008)
- Symphonic Variations (2009)
- Rhapsody (2009)
- Variations on a Theme by Mahler (2010) - Winner of the 2010 ASCAP Morton Gould Award
- Piano Sonata No. 1 (2011)
- Transcription on the Scherzo of Tchaikovsky's 4th Symphony

=== Chamber ===
- Two Ditties for Mixed Ensemble (2003)
- Waltz for String Quintet (2003)
- Fantasy for Cello and Piano (2003)
- Violin Sonatina (2005)
- String Quartet (2006 - Lost)
- Piano Trio No. 1 (2011)

=== Orchestral ===
- Classical Symphonietta (2004)
- "Exit, Stage Left! - Scherzo for Orchestra (2005)
- Piano Concerto No. 1 (2006)
- Olympics Caprice (2007)
- "Nostalgia" Suite (2007)
- "Olympics Overture" - (2008)
- Symphony No. 1 (2008)
- Piano Concerto No. 2 "1899 Overture" (2009)
- Toothpaste - en homage a Beyoncé (2009)
- Concert Allegro (2010)
- "Hourly Reminiscence" - Concert Finale for Piano Concerto (2010) - Winner of the 2011 Juilliard Orchestral Prize
- Symphony No. 2 (2011)
- Piano Concerto No. 3 (2011)
- Symphony No. 3 (2012)
- "Death of the Honeybees" - Grand Ballet in Two Acts (2013)
- Symphony No. 4 "Rejuvenation", op. 41 (2014)
- Symphony No. 5, op. 43 (2015)
- Viola Concerto, op. 50 (2017)
- Symphony No. 6, op. 51 (2017)
- Symphony No. 10 "Peking Fantasy" (2019)
