= Central Philharmonic Orchestra =

Central Philharmonic
- Symphony orchestra
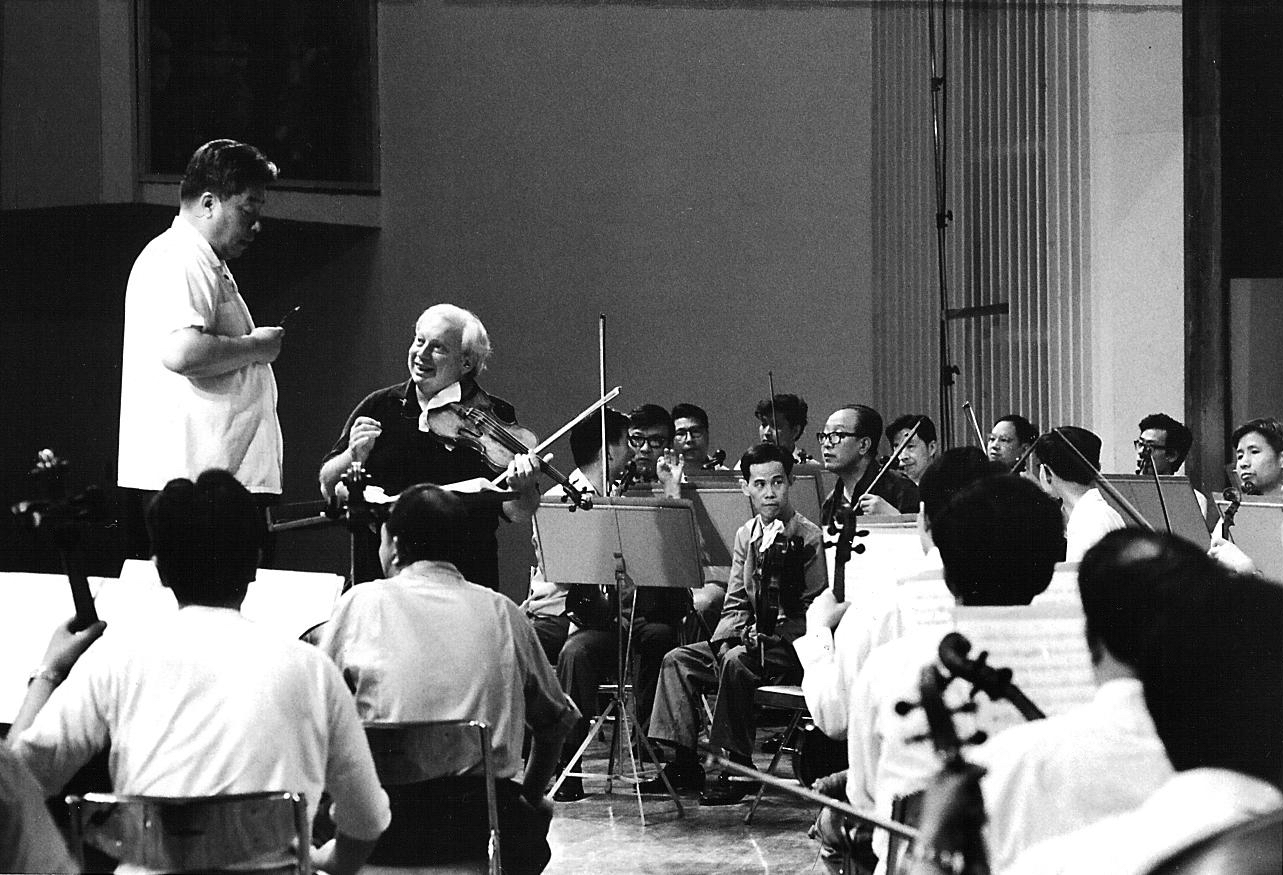
- Isaac Stern rehearsing with the Central Philharmonic Orchestra in China in 1979
- Native name: 中央乐团
- Former name: Central Opera Company Orchestra
- Location: Beijing, China

The Central Philharmonic (Chinese: 中央乐团; pinyin: Zhōngyāng Yuètuán) is a symphony orchestra (with chorus, chamber orchestra, and group of soloists) based in Beijing, China. Its predecessor was the Central Opera Company Orchestra. In 1996, it was renamed the China National Symphony Orchestra.

The orchestra's first director was Zheng Xiaoying. Other directors have included Li Delun and Yan Liangkun (严良堃). During the 1970s, Wang Jianzhong was its composer-in-residence.

The orchestra has performed in China, Hong Kong, and Macau, as well as the United States, Spain, South Korea, and Taiwan. It has given the first performances of many new compositions by Chinese composers.

Notable works produced by the orchestra include the Yellow River Cantata and Yellow River Piano Concerto.
