= Spring Festival Suite =

Chinese orchestral work

Spring Festival Suite (Chinese: 春節組曲; pinyin: Chūnjié Zǔqǔ) is a Chinese orchestral work composed by Li Huanzhi (李焕之) between 1955 and 1956, depicting the scene when folks in Shanbei region were celebrating the Chinese New Year (Spring Festival). The tune is widely heard primarily in Mainland China, where it appears frequently in school music textbooks, as well as being played on various festive occasions. The most known movement of the suite is the first movement, the overture. It is often played by its own, and is known as the Spring Festival Overture (Chinese: 春節序曲).

In 2007 the overture of the work was selected to be carried and broadcast into space on China's first lunar probe, Chang'e 1.

== Instrumentation ==
The suite calls for piccolo, two flutes, two oboes, cor anglais, two clarinets in B-flat, two bassoons, four horns in F, two trumpets in B-flat, three trombones, tuba, three timpani, cymbals, triangle, various Chinese percussion instruments, celeste, harp, first and second violins, violas, celli, and double basses.

== Structure ==
The suite is in four movements, marked as follows:

1. “Overture – Da Yang Ge (Chinese: 序曲—大秧歌)”, Allegro con fuoco – Moderato grazioso – Allegro
2. Andante cantabile
3. Rondo
4. Moderato

The first movement overture -- Yangko, is a complex trilogy. The allegro is composed of two folk suona tunes in northern Shaanxi. The middle part is the medium plate, Shanbei Yangko tone, by the oboe and cello successively played melody; Finally, the main music is replayed in full by the trumpet lead band.

The second movement of the love song is a cantabile andante. It begins with an English wind lead. Then came the theme of love song in Northern Shaanxi. After repeating the love song for six times, it gradually returns to the theme of the signature mode answered by the violin and cello, and finally reproduces the lead tone through the connecting sentence.

The third movement disc song is a roundabout type waltz. It is composed of a theme symbolizing the happy gathering of the people in the festival and two subtopics as the first and second part of the contrast. The tones are all from the Yangko key material of leading Shanbei singing.

The fourth movement is a three-part lantern club, medium plate, and the main music is derived from the folk conformation music of northern Shaanxi Suona (" Dabai Team "). The middle part of the Yangko tune "Picking pumpkins", "land boat" overlapping tones appear, the performance of Yangko in the small scene. The end part reproduces the main music, adding the warm Yangko gongs and drums rhythm to end the whole piece.

The first movement was often performed later under the title of the Spring Festival Overture.
