= Yin Chengzong =

Chinese composer

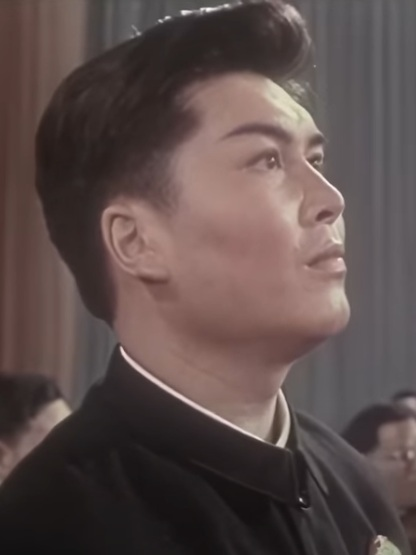
Yin Chengzong in 1970

Yin Chengzong (Chinese: 殷承宗; pinyin: Yīn Chéngzōng, Hokkien: Un Seng Chong; born 1941) is a Chinese pianist and composer.

Born in Fujian, Yin began learning the piano at a very young age where he played both Western and Chinese compositions. From Fujian, he studied at Shanghai and Leningrad whilst receiving awards from international competitions. In 1963, he received praise from both Mao Zedong and his wife Jiang Qing which allowed him to play the piano during the Cultural Revolution, during which the piano was labelled as bourgeois. Jiang remained involved throughout Yin's career in the 1960s and early 1970s. His two most important pieces are a piano-accompanied version of The Legend of the Red Lantern and the Yellow River Piano Concerto, which he helped create with other Chinese musicians.

== Life and career ==
=== Early life and education ===
Yin was born in 1941 on the "Piano Island" of Gulangyu Island in Xiamen, Fujian. At this time, Gulangyu was part of an International Settlement that was established in 1902, which allowed for Western and Chinese culture to interact with one another. As such, Yin was gradually influenced by Western music as a child. At 3-years old, Yin started playing the piano. He held his first recital at 9-years old where he played works by Chopin and Schubert alongside revolutionary Chinese songs like The Sky above the Liberated Areas.

At 12-years old, Yin left Gulangyu to attend the preparatory school of Shanghai Conservatory of Music where he first met with pianist Li Jialu, who was also from Gulangyu Island. Li helped teach young pianists, such as Yin and Gu Shengying. Yin also studied under the Soviet music teachers D.M. Serov, A.G. Tatulyan, and T.P. Kravtchenko. In 1959, he won the first prize at the World Youth Gala Piano Competition in Vienna. Due to his performance at Vienna, the Soviets selected him to study at the Leningrad Conservatory in 1960, where it was intended that Yin would study there for 5-years. In 1962, he and American pianist Susan Starr were the second-prize winners of the International Tchaikovsky Competition held in the USSR. However, political relations between China and the USSR soured in the Sino-Soviet split, forcing Yin to return to China and study at the Central Conservatory of Music in Beijing.

On December 31, 1963, the government arranged for a small concert at the Central Conservatory whose programme was selected by Jiang Qing (Mao Zedong's wife), with Yin and Liu Shikun playing the piano. Yin played one foreign (Chopin's Scherzo No. 2) and one Chinese (his own Yangge Dance). Mao was in attendance and met with Yin, encouraging him to research more music based on national elements and to write more compositions that expressed Chinese traditions on the piano. Yin graduated from the Central Conservatory in 1965.

=== Cultural Revolution ===
Under Mao Zedong, music in China became increasingly politicised with elements of populism. Piano music now followed government guidelines. With the onset of the 1960s, this situation continued and music became increasingly censored and politicised. When the Cultural Revolution began in 1966 it, through the Red Guards, began to suppress 'bourgeois' elements in Chinese culture, such as those associated with Western culture. The piano and piano music fell under this bourgeois label. In 1964, the Socialist Education Movement caused Yin to be sent to rural Tong County near Beijing to work and learn orthodox ideologies. Despite attitudes towards the piano, Yin being received by Mao gave him a more solid political background that allowed him to continue to use the piano. Using his position, he set out to prove to the government that the piano was needed and could serve revolutionary ideas.

To celebrate the 25th anniversary of Mao's speeches at the Yan'an forum on the role of arts and literature, the Central Government held a conference at the Great Hall of the People on 23 May 1967. With three other members of the Central Philharmonic, Yin played on the piano mainly Chairman Mao's quotation songs and his own compositions based on folk songs to a general audience. He then began to arrange opera music onto the piano, attending the China Peking Opera Troupe for lessons. Yin also worked to compose music with the Central Philharmonic for their National Day performance at the National Culture Palace on 7 October 1967. Collaborating with actress Liu Changyu, who played in model operas, Yin's piano-accompanied version of The Legend of the Red Lantern was popular. On November 20, the version received the approval of Jiang, who also encouraged Yin to continue his work with the piano. In 1968, at the 49th anniversary celebrations of the Chinese Communist Party's founding, Jiang gave a positive response to the completed version by Yin, where the piano was to be emphasised. This helped shift the piano's status in the Cultural Revolution. Historian Richard Curt Kraus states that "Yin's experiments in writing Chinese music for the piano coincided with the musical interests of the woman who would become his most important patron, Jiang Qing".

Performance of the Yellow River Piano Concerto in May 1970, with Yin as the piano soloist.

Following the performance at the 49th anniversary celebrations, Yin became quite popular with stamps and posters with his face being produced. The Red Lantern was immediately followed by another piano project - the Yellow River Piano Concerto. The Yellow River was produced by a group of composers that included Yin with Chu Wanghua, Sheng Lihong and Liu Zhuang, and assisted by Xu Peixing and Shi Shucheng. Work was headed by Yin, whilst Chu wrote most of the music. According to Chu, the idea came from Jiang who suggested adapting the Yellow River Cantata by Xian Xinghai, written in 1939 during the war with Japan. Throughout the production, she maintained an important role and got them to incorporate The East Is Red and The Internationale into it. The Yellow River Piano Concerto was first performed in February 1970 before a small audience of the Central Audience, with Yin as the piano soloist. In April, it was performed for foreign businessmen at the China Guangzhou Commodities Fair during China's process of opening up to the West. It officially premiered before domestic audiences in May at the National Culture Palace.

In 1973, Yin composed Colourful Clous Chasing the Moon. With Wang Jianzhong and Liu Zhuang, Ambush from Ten Sides was composed in the same year.

In 1973, during the Cultural Revolution, Yin joined the Chinese Communist Party, and, four years earlier in 1969, at the suggestion of Jiang Qing, changed his name to Yin Chengzhong (殷诚忠), as his original given name, Chengzong (承 宗, literally "carrying on the ancestral legacy"), was considered unsuitable due to its supposed association with the perpetuation of the traditions of the exploiting class; his new given name, Chengzhong (诚忠), carried the literal meaning of "sincere and loyal." (After relocating to the United States in 1983, however, he reverted to his original name.)

=== United States ===
In 1983, following difficulties with the new post-Mao Chinese Communist Party due to his alleged closeness to the Gang of Four, Yin emigrated to the US, and in the same year, he made his debut in Carnegie Hall in New York City. Yin has since performed under the baton of Eugene Ormandy and the Philadelphia Orchestra, Claudio Abbado and the Vienna Philharmonic Orchestra, Kirill Kondrashin and the Moscow Philharmonic Orchestra, and Sir Malcolm Sargent and the St. Petersburg Philharmonic Orchestra. Yin has also appeared in Boston, San Francisco, Chicago, Toronto, and at Lincoln Center. His solo performances were featured on China Central Television and CBS Sunday Morning. Formerly a professor and artist-in-residence at the Cleveland Institute of Music, Mr. Yin now lives in New York City.

Yin has released more than 20 albums, including an all-Chopin CD, a recording of Debussy's Preludes, and the Yellow River Concerto.
