= Daniel Epstein (pianist) =

American pianist

Daniel Epstein (born 1946) is an American pianist.

== Life ==
A graduate of the Juilliard School, Epstein received international recognition when the conductor, Eugene Ormandy, invited him to perform with the Philadelphia Orchestra in 1973. Later that year, in the wake of President Nixon's visit to the People's Republic of China, and at the insistence of the American government, Ormandy and the Philadelphia became the first American orchestra to tour China. Ormandy chose Epstein to accompany him on this cultural mission. Before their departure, in an appearance at Saratoga Springs, Epstein gave the American premiere of Yin Chengzong's arrangement of the Yellow River Piano Concerto, one of the works which the Chinese had requested the Americans to play later on tour. In doing so, Epstein contributed to the first American performance of music from the pen of a Chinese composer working in the Western classical tradition. They received a very positive reception in Beijing. On their return from China, Epstein teamed up with Ormandy and the orchestra again to record the concerto on an LP album.

In 1976, Epstein founded the Raphael Trio, with which he has performed virtually the entire piano trio repertoire in the three decades of the ensemble's existence. He regularly appears as a guest soloist with symphony orchestras and has collected such honors as the Kosciuszko Chopin Award, the National Arts Club Prize, the Prix Alex de Vries in Paris, and the Concert Artists Guild Award. Since 1997, Epstein has taught piano, chamber music, and music history at the Manhattan School of Music and, in 2001, was appointed to the piano faculty. He is also head of the piano faculty at Rutgers University
