= Li Delun =

Li Delun (simplified Chinese: 李德伦; traditional Chinese: 李德倫; June 6th 1917– October 19th 2001) was a Chinese conductor who devoted his life to the promotion of classical music in China. Hailed as the father of China's classical music, the Li Delun Music Foundation and Li Delun National Conducting Competition was named after him in honour of his contribution to the development of classical music in China.

== Career ==
In 1946, with support from Zhou Enlai (who in 1949 became the first Prime Minister of the People's Republic of China) Li Delun took an assortment of donated musical instruments to the city of Yan'an and became the founder, instructor, and conductor of China's first professional symphony orchestra. In 1953, he went to Moscow to further his studies under the celebrated conductor Professor Nikolai Anosov. He returned to China in 1957 after graduating from the Moscow Conservatory and was made conductor of the China Central Philharmonic and was put in charge to provide music at state and diplomatic functions such as entertaining important visitors such as Henry Kissinger on his earlier secret diplomatic missions to Beijing. Towards the end of the cultural revolution, despite China's political tumult of the late 1960s, when all "decadent" music was banned, Maestro bravely presented Beethoven's Fifth Symphony in a concert commemorating the 150th anniversary of Beethoven's death. The event broke the ban on public performances of western music and drew worldwide attention and signaled the reemergence of classical music in China.

In 1979, Maestro Li joined hands with American violinist Isaac Stern to perform the violin concertos of Mozart and Brahms. This historical musical collaboration was captured in the Academy Award-winning documentary From Mao to Mozart, which offered some of the first glimpses of a newly opening China. In the ensuing years, Li served as a bridge between musicians from China and abroad, performing with artists such as David Oistrakh, Isaac Stern, Yehudi Menuhin, Yo-Yo Ma, Fou Tsong, Liu Shikun, Yin Chengzong and many others. The China Central Philharmonic Society traveled the world performing under his baton, and he guest-conducted numerous international orchestras, including the Toronto Symphony Orchestra and Vancouver Symphony Orchestra in 1986 and 1989 respectively.

Maestro Li's professional and philanthropic work earned him rewards and accolades around the world. He adjudicated for the International Tchaikovsky Cello Competition in Moscow in 1990 and the Yehudi Menuhin International Competition for Young Violinists in Paris. Some of his many awards include the Liszt Medal of Decoration awarded by Hungarian government and the Presidential Friendship Medal conferred by former Russian president Boris Yeltsin.

Li believed that classical music was not rarefied art for the upper class but rather something to be enjoyed by all. He was a tireless advocate for classical music and spent his free time lecturing on the subject of music enjoyment throughout China, presenting its beauty and sophistication with a simple and humorous delivery to university students and factory workers alike, making it appealing to the younger generation as well as the general public. On October 19, 2001, Li Delun died at age 84 in a Beijing hospital.
