= Lü Ji (composer) =

Chinese musician

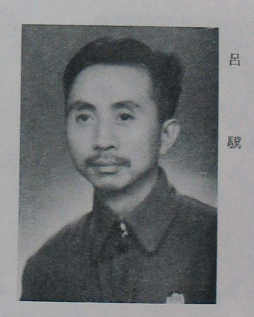
Lü Ji

Lü Ji (Chinese: 吕骥; pinyin: Lǚ Jì; Yale romanization: Lyǔ Jì; 1909 – January 5, 2002), originally named Lü Zhanqing (吕展青; pinyin: Lǚ Zhǎnqīng; Yale romanization: Lyǔ Jǎn-Chīng), was a Chinese composer. He was also a music writer, educator, and administrator.

He was born in Xiangtan, Hunan in 1909 and became interested in music from an early age, learning to play several traditional instruments. He graduated from Changsha Chang Jun Secondary School in Changsha, and studied music at the Shanghai Music Training School (now the Shanghai Conservatory of Music). In 1931 or 1932 he joined the Leftist Dramatic League in Shanghai, and he joined the Chinese Communist Party in 1935. He became one of the most active composers of revolutionary Chinese music during the 1930s.

In a 1936 article entitled "Zhongguo xin yinyue" (China New Music), he set out his philosophy about revolutionary music:

[It's] the weapon to win over the emancipation of masses, a kind of means that reflects and shows the feelings, the thoughts and the life of masses, a further assumption of the responsibility in the awakening, the education and the organization of masses' mission.

—

After the establishment of the People's Republic of China in 1949, he was appointed vice president of the Central Conservatory of Music in Beijing.

His best-known compositions include "Goddess of Freedom" (自由神), "New September 18 Tune" (新編九一八小調), 保衛馬德進而, “School Song of the Counter-Japanese Military and Political University" (抗日軍政大學校歌), "Going to the Front-lines after Graduation" (畢業上前線), "Railroad Workers' Song" (鐵路工人歌), and the choral work "Nirvana of the Phoenix" (鳳凰涅槃).

He published books in the field of music education and the guqin.

Lü died at Peking Union Medical College Hospital on January 5, 2002, at the age of 92.

== See also ==
- Nie Er
- Ren Guang
- Xian Xinghai
- He Luting
