= Joanne Chan =

Writer and arts administrator in Hong Kong. Awarded Chevalier by French Government

Joanne Chan (Chinese: 陳祖泳), Chevalier dans l'Ordre des Arts et des Lettres, is a Hong Kong writer and arts administrator. She was educated in Canada and France, specialising in art history and fine arts before subsequently obtaining a Masters in Journalism.

Chan is inaugural CEO of Le French May Arts Festival in Hong Kong and Macau. She also founded a boutique cultural organisation, Per Artem Lumen. She served on the board for a variety of cultural arts organisations including the Hong Kong Philharmonic Orchestra, the Panel of Film Censorship, Advisory Committee on Arts Development (Visual Arts), the Harbourfront Commission, the Hong Kong Dance Company, and the El Sistema Hong Kong.

Chan speaks and writes regularly on classical music, French culture, and the arts, and her works have appeared in magazines, television and on radio programmes. She was a co-host of Vive la France (“法識生活”) on RTHK 2 and Vive la Musique Classique Française (“法識音樂”) on RTHK 4.

Chan is the author of a children’s music books series entitled Happy Gabby.

== Works ==
=== Children's books ===
- Happy Gabby children's music book series
  - Happy Gabby Plays Classical Music (2017)
  - Happy Gabby Plays Chinese Classics (2018)
  - Happy Gabby Leads the Circus (2018)
  - Happy Gabby's Grand Animal Adventures (2019)
  - Happy Gabby Jams with Animals (2020)

=== Concerts ===
- Happy Gabby's Debussy Musical Adventures (May 7th, 2021)
- Come Fly with Captain Happy Gabby (November 26th, 2021)
- Happy Gabby - Sound of Music (June 29th - July 21st, 2019)
