= Guang Weiran =

Chinese poet

- Born: Zhang Guangnian; 1 November 1913; Laohekou, Hubei, China
- Died: 28 January 2002 (aged 88); Beijing, China
- Occupations: Poet, military leader
- Writing career
- Genre: War

Guang Weiran (Chinese: 光未然; pinyin: Guāng Wèirán, 1 November 1913 – 28 January 2002), born Zhang Guangnian (Chinese: 张光年; pinyin: Zhāng Guāngnián), was a Chinese poet and military leader. He is best known for writing the poem that inspired the Yellow River Cantata.

== Biography ==
Guang Weiran was born in Laohekou, Guanghua County, Hubei in 1913. He dropped out of high school to participate in the Chinese Communist Youth League in 1927. In 1935, he published "Fresh Flowers in May", which was widely popularized in the "12 September Movement" after being set to music by Yan Shushi, and joined the Chinese Communist Party in 1937. He then enrolled in Wuchang University of China. He was inspired to write the Yellow River Cantata as an "anti-Japanese propaganda" technique when Japan invaded China in 1939. It was said that while leading his troops into battle, he fell off his horse and broke his left arm which gave him time to write the poem. It is also said that while travelling, he saw fishermen singing uplifting songs which also inspired him to write the poem.

In 1940, he went to Chongqing, where he wrote a long narrative poem called "Qu Yuan", and in 1942, he returned to Yunnan, and in October 1945, he left Kunming, and in October 1945, he went to Myanmar. He left Kunming in October 1945 and entered the liberated areas of North China via Beiping in 1946, where he taught at the Northern University and the North China University.

After 1949, he lived in Beijing, where he served as editor-in-chief of People's Literature and Wenyi Bao, and secretary of the Secretariat of the Chinese Writers' Association. He was a deputy to the Third and Fifth National People's Congresses. Later he was a member of the Central Advisory Commission (CPC) and Honorary Vice-Chairman of the Chinese Writers' Association.

He died in Beijing on 28 January 2002, and his ashes were scattered into the Yellow River on 25 July 2003, in Jishi Town, Haidong District, Qinghai Province.
