= The Legend of the Red Lantern =

1960s Chinese opera

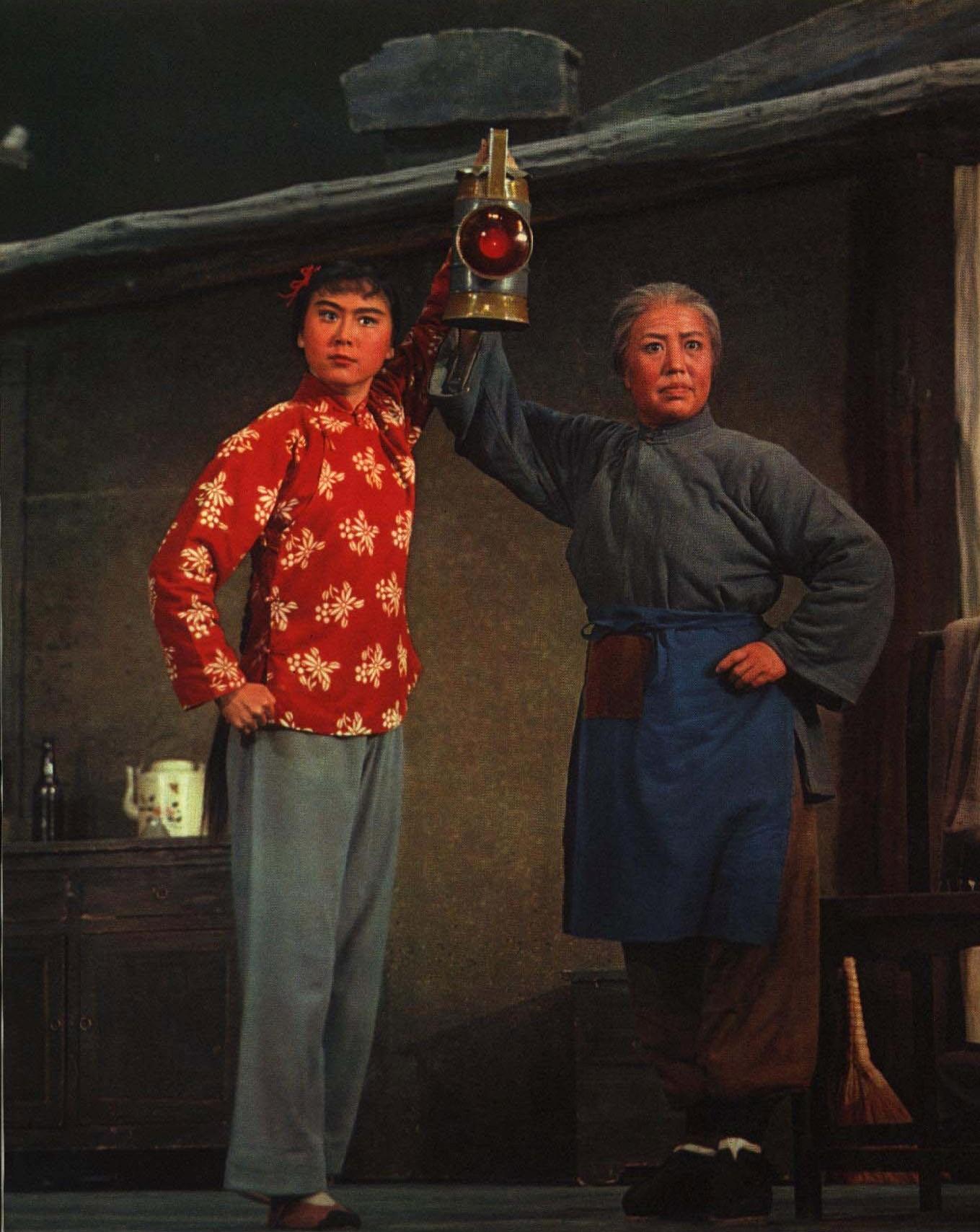
The Legend of the Red Lantern, performed as one of the eight model operas, 1967.

The Legend of the Red Lantern (Chinese: 红灯记; pinyin: hóng dēng jì) is one of the Eight model plays promoted during the Cultural Revolution in China. The official version was that of a Beijing Opera. It was additionally adapted to a piano-accompanied cantata by pianist Yin Chengzong, formed by a cycle of arias extracted from the opera itself.

The play is based on a movie titled There Will be Followers (自有后来人) made in 1963, which is based a novel titled There Will be Followers of Revolution (革命自有后来人) by Qian Daoyuan (钱道源) first published in 1958. The novel in turn is based on a true story of communist undercover agents working at a Huicui (辉崔) railway station in Hulin, fighting Japanese invaders during the Second Sino-Japanese War.

The class enemies in such the model operas were depicted as 'cruel' and 'oppressive'.

== Summary ==
The play concentrated on the exploits of the communist underground activities under Japanese occupation in 1939, though history traces back to the 1920s.

When Li Yuhe, a railroad worker who was engaging in underground work, is taken away by special agents, and Grandma Li has a premonition of being arrested. Grandma tells the protagonist, Li Tiemei, the true story about her family. Grandma Li tells Li Tiemei how her parents have sacrificed their lives in the revolutionary struggle. Li Yuhe has taken up the unfulfilled task of the martyrs. After hearing the heroic story of her family, Li Tiemei is determined to follow the example of her father and carry the revolution through to the end. All three of the young female protagonists in the story express "extreme anger and hatred toward their enemies," according to Lu Xing's analysis, along with "a fierce determination to join the revolutionary force." These emotions intensified through the course of the opera as the music and singing became more passionate.

== Anthologies ==
An English version was included in the 2010 anthology The Columbia Anthology of Modern Chinese Drama, with editing by Xiaomei Chen, as well as the 2016 anthology The Big Red Book of Modern Chinese Literature edited by Yunte Huang.
