= Nie Er =

Chinese composer (1912–1935)

- 聂守信
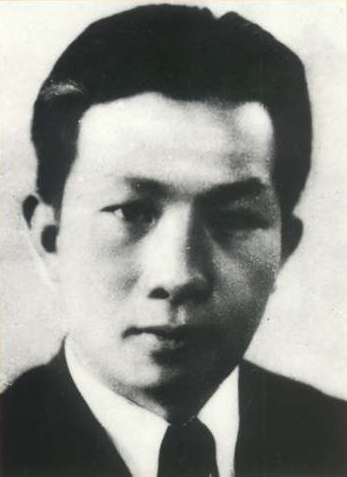
- Born: Nie Shouxin; February 14, 1912; Kunming, Yunnan, China
- Died: July 17, 1935 (aged 23); Fujisawa, Japan
- Other name: George Njal
- Education: Yunnan Provincial No.1 Normal School
- Occupations: Composer and musician
- Relatives: [聂鸿仪/Nie Hongyi] (father), [彭寂宽/Peng Jikuan] (mother), [聂叙伦/Nie Xulun] (Brother)

Nie Er
- Traditional Chinese: 聶耳
- Simplified Chinese: 聂耳
Transcriptions
Standard Mandarin
- Hanyu Pinyin: Niè Ěr
- Wade–Giles: Nieh^{4} Erh^{3}
- Yale Romanization: Nyè Ěr

Nie Shouxin
- Traditional Chinese: 聶守信
- Simplified Chinese: 聂守信
Transcriptions
Standard Mandarin
- Hanyu Pinyin: Niè Shǒuxìn
- Wade–Giles: Nieh^{4} Shou^{3}-hsin^{4}
- Yale Romanization: Nyè Shǒu-Syìn

Nie Er (14 February 1912 – 17 July 1935), born Nie Shouxin, courtesy name Ziyi (子義 or 紫藝), was a Chinese composer best known for March of the Volunteers, the national anthem of the People's Republic of China. In numerous Shanghai magazines, he went by the English name George Njal, after a character in Njal's Saga.

== Biography ==
Nie Er's parents were from Yuxi, Yunnan, in southwest China. He was born in Kunming, Yunnan where his parents ran a medical clinic. From 1918 he studied at Kunming Wuhua Changchun Elementary School. From an early age he displayed an interest in music; he learned to play traditional instruments such as the dizi, erhu, sanxian, and yueqin, and became the conductor of the school's Children's Orchestra. In 1922 he entered the Private Qiushi Primary School (Senior Section), and in 1925 he entered Yunnan Provincial Number One Combined Middle School.

In 1927, Nie Er entered Yunnan Provincial Number One Normal School, where he participated in the book club and organized the Nine-Nine Music Society, which performed within the school and outside. During this time, he learned to play the violin and piano.

Nie joined the Communist Youth League in 1928.

Nie Er relocated to Shanghai in 1930 and, in June 1931, he joined the Mingyue Musical Drama Society as a violinist. In July 1932 he published A Short Treatise on Chinese Song and Dance, in which he criticized the Drama Society's president, Li Jinhui, as a result of which he was removed from the society. Prior to joining the Lianhua Film Studio in November 1932, he took part in shaping the Bright Moonlight Song and Dance Troupe. He later joined the musical group of the Friends of the Soviet Union Society. He also organized the Chinese Contemporary Music Research Group, which participated in the Leftist Dramatist's Union. In 1933, he joined the Chinese Communist Party.

In 1933, he portrayed an African American miner in the film The Light of Maternal Instinct. In April 1934, Nie Er joined Pathé Records where he managed the music department. In the same year he founded the Pathé National Orchestra. In January 1935, he became the director of the musical department of Lianhua Number Two Studio.

Nie composed the music for The March of the Volunteers as theme song (with lyrics by Tian Han, an underground Communist Party Member) for the 1935 film Children of Troubled Times. The song became a popular symbol of resistance to the Japanese invasion of China and later the national anthem of the People's Republic of China.

== Name ==
Nie Shouxin showed signs of musical talent from an early age; he was able to imitate the voices of people he knew and showed a talent for learning songs by ear, earning him the nickname "Ears" (耳, "Er").

Nie also had the capability of physically moving his ears independently. This earned him another nickname, "Doctor Ears." He reportedly said, "Since friends give me one more ears, I will have one more ears from now on." Nie Shouxin later changed his name to Nie Er (聂耳).

== Death ==
On July 17, 1935, Nie died while swimming in Fujisawa, Kanagawa, Japan, at the age of twenty-three. He may have been en route to the Soviet Union, passing through Japan to receive training, sent by the Chinese Communist Party. Some suspect that he was killed by the Japanese, while others believe that he was killed by Chinese Nationalists, as he was in Japan to flee from them. However, because he disappeared while swimming with friends, this made the possibility of assassination difficult and highly unlikely. Evidence points to drowning as the most probable cause of death. He was found by the local rescue team the following day. According to the rescue team and the police, there was no reason to suspect foul play.

== Compositions ==
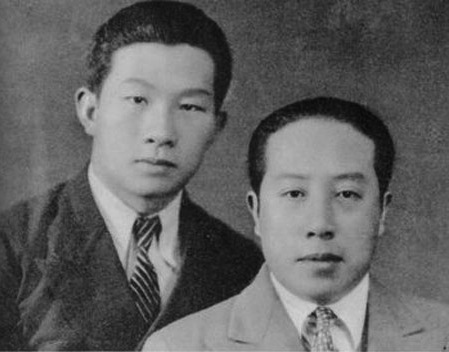
Nie Er (left) and Tian Han (right), respectively the composer and lyricist of "March of the Volunteers", now China's national anthem, photographed in Shanghai in 1933

Nie Er wrote a total of 37 pieces in his life, all in the three years before his untimely death. A significant proportion of these songs reflected working class life and struggles. He often collaborated with lyricist Tian Han.

Apart from "March of the Volunteers", his other important works include:

- 1932:
  - "March" (进行曲; pinyin: Jìnxíng Qǔ)
  - "Waltz" (圆舞曲; pinyin: Yuánwǔ Qǔ)
  - "Love of Family Union" (天伦之爱; pinyin: Tiānlún Zhī Ài)
- 1933:
  - "Miners' Song" (开矿歌; pinyin: Kāikuàng Gē)
  - "Song of Hunger and Cold Suffering" (饥寒交迫之歌; pinyin: Jīhánjiāopò Zhī Gǖ)
  - "Song of Newsboy" (卖报歌; pinyin: Màibào Gē)
- 1934:

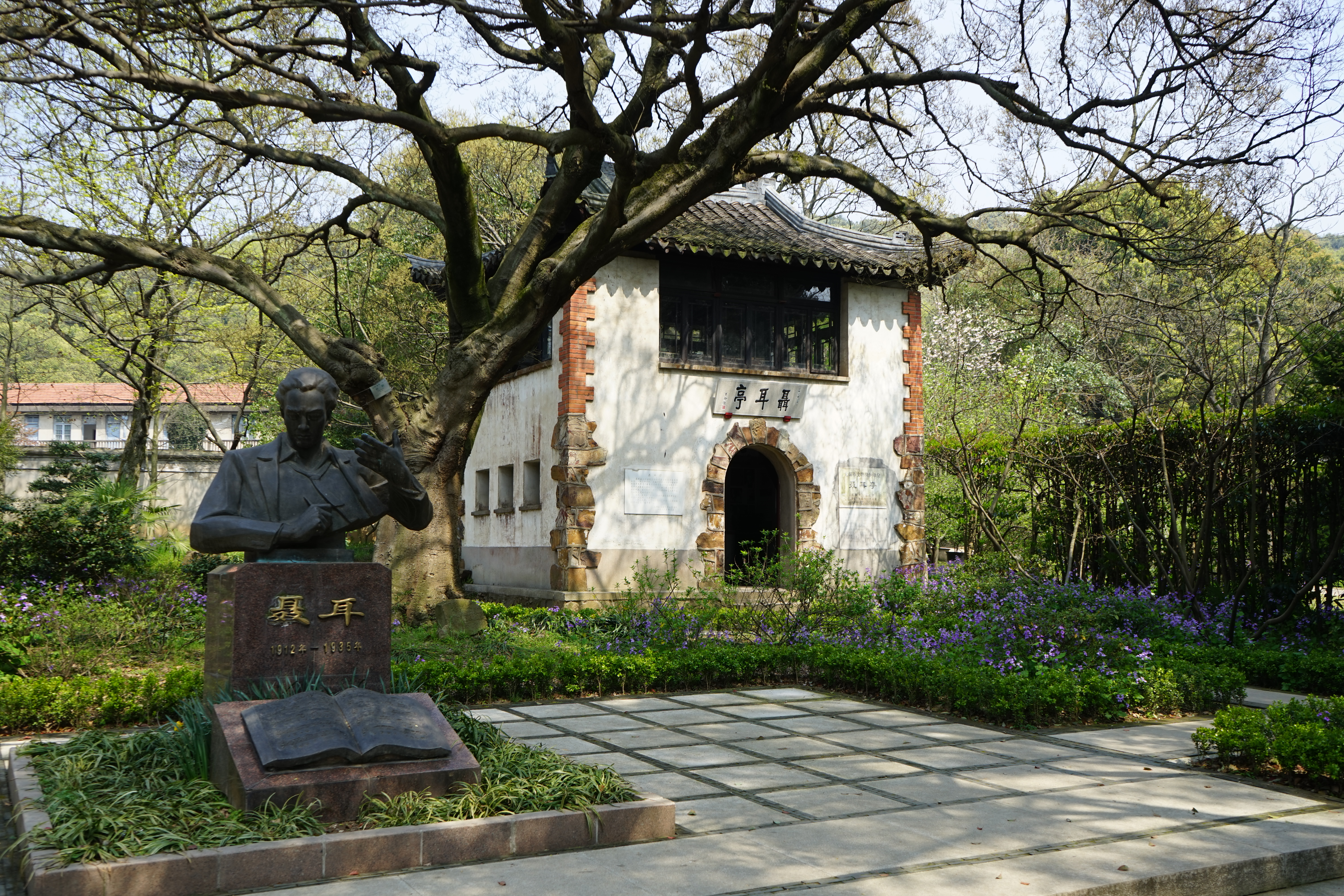
Nie Er Pavilion, in the Turtle Head Park, Wuxi. Originally a small attic in Chen's garden, in 1934, Shanghai Lianhua Film Co. Ltd. shot the exterior scene for film The Big Road and Ni Er lived here to compose music.

  - "Out of Studio" (走出摄影场; pinyin: Zǒuchū Shèyǐng Chǎng)
  - "A Female Star" (一个女明星; pinyin: Yíge Nǚ Míngxīng)
  - "Snow Flying" (雪飞花; pinyin: Xuě Fēi Huā)
  - "Spring Dawn on the Green Lake" (翠湖春晓; pinyin: Cuì Hú Chūn Xiǎo), instrumental piece
  - "Snowflakes Flutter" (雪花飞; pinyin: Xuěhuā Fēi)
  - "Dance of the Golden Snake" (金蛇狂舞; pinyin: Jīnshé Kuáng Wǔ), arranged from the last fast section of the Jiangnan sizhu piece "Yang Ba Qu" 阳八曲 (pinyin: Yáng Bā Qǔ, "Yang Eight Tune"), also called Fan Wang Gong 梵王宫 (pinyin: Fàn Wáng Gōng, "Fa as Mi") or 梵皇宫 (pinyin: Fàn Huáng Gōng)
  - "Zhaojun He Fan" (昭君和番; pinyin: Zhāojūn Hé Fān)
  - "Little Wild Cat" (大野猫; pinyin: Dà Yěmāo)
  - "Song of Making Bricks" (打砖歌; pinyin: Dǎ Zhuān Gē)
  - "Dock Workers' Song" (码头工人歌; pinyin: Mǎtóu Gōngrén Gē)
  - "Song of Labor Force" (苦力歌; pinyin: Kǔlì Gē)
  - "Graduation Song" (毕业歌; pinyin: Bìyè Gē)
  - "Song of the Broad Road" (大路歌; pinyin: Dàlù Gē)
  - "Pioneers" (开路先锋; pinyin: Kāilù Xiānfēng)
  - "Song of Whirling Flowers" (飞花歌; pinyin: Fēihuā Gē)
- 1935:
  - "Leaving Southeast Asia" (告别南洋; pinyin: Gàobié Nányáng)
  - "Spring is Coming Back" (春回来了; pinyin: Chūn Huílái Le)
  - "Song of Comfort" (慰劳歌; pinyin: Wèiláo Gē)
  - "Song of Mei Niang" (梅娘曲; pinyin: Méi Niáng Gē)
  - "Tone of Fugitive" (逃亡曲; pinyin: Táowáng Qǔ)
  - "Village Girl of the Steppes" (塞外村女; pinyin: Sàiwài Cūnnǚ)
  - "Hit the Changjiang River" (打长江; pinyin: Dǎ Chángjiāng)
  - "Song of Picking Water Chestnuts" (采菱歌; pinyin: Cǎi Líng Gē)
  - "Singing Girl Downtrodden" (铁蹄下的歌女; pinyin: Tiětí Xià De Gēnǚ)
  - "Small Worker" (小工人; pinyin: Xiǎo Gōngrén)
  - "Song of Wounded Soldier" (伤兵歌; pinyin: Shāngbīng Gē)
  - "Progress Song" (前进歌; pinyin: Qiánjìn Gē)
  - "Song of White Snow" (白雪歌; pinyin: Báixuě Gē)
  - "Song of Picking Tea" (采茶歌; pinyin: Cǎi Chá Gē)
  - "Love Song of Tea Mountain" (茶山情歌; pinyin: Cháshān Qínggē)
  - "New Woman" (新女性; pinyin: Xīn Nǚxìng)
  - Storm on the Yangtze (扬子江暴风雨; pinyin: Yángzǐ Jiāng Bàofēngyǔ) (an opera)

== Legacy ==
Though Nie Er's career as a composer lasted for only two years, his music has come to symbolize the modern Chinese national musical style.

Nie's "March of the Volunteers" was adopted as the national anthem of the People's Republic of China.

His other songs and instrumental pieces came to epitomize Chinese patriotism, revolving around topics such as the trials and suffering of the working class or the resistance of the Chinese people in face of Japanese aggression. Many of his compositions are still emblematic of Chinese national music, and he has been memorialized in a number of commemorative contexts.

=== Film ===
In 1959, on the 10th anniversary of the founding of the People's Republic, China produced a biopic entitled Nie Er, retelling the story of Nie Er and his composition of the Chinese National Anthem.

=== Nie Er Piano ===
The Nie Er Piano company was founded by Zhu Xuegong in Shanghai in 1958.

=== Nie Er Park ===
Nie Er Park, located on the northernmost area of Yuxi City, encompasses 100,000 square meters, and was completed in July 1987. The park is divided into areas for entertaining, relaxation, cultural activities, children's play, ornamental flowers, and park administration.

Nie Er's statue is the central focus of the park. The statue is 2.4 meters tall, weighs 1.8 tons, and faces north. The height of the platform under the statue is 2.25 meters. He is depicted in an arms-raised posture as if conducting a musical ensemble.

=== Nie Er Cultural Square ===
Nie Er Cultural Square is located at Yuxi, Yunnan, which is composed by one lake, two line (outer traffic line and inner lake line), and four areas (recreational area, business area, exercising area and musical square area).

At the top of the mountain is a statue of Nie Er playing the violin; the pedestal of the statue bears an engraving of six words written by former member of the Politburo Standing Committee of the Chinese Communist Party, Li Lanqing designating the area as "Nie Er Musical square" (聂耳音乐广场). When viewed from above, the design of the square is shaped like a large violin.

=== Nie Er Square in Japan ===
In 1981, Fujisawa, Japan, under the socialist mayor Shun Hayama (葉山峻), and Kunming became sister cities. Nie Er Square was established in Shonan Beach Park (湘南海岸公園), near the beach where he had died.

== Gallery ==
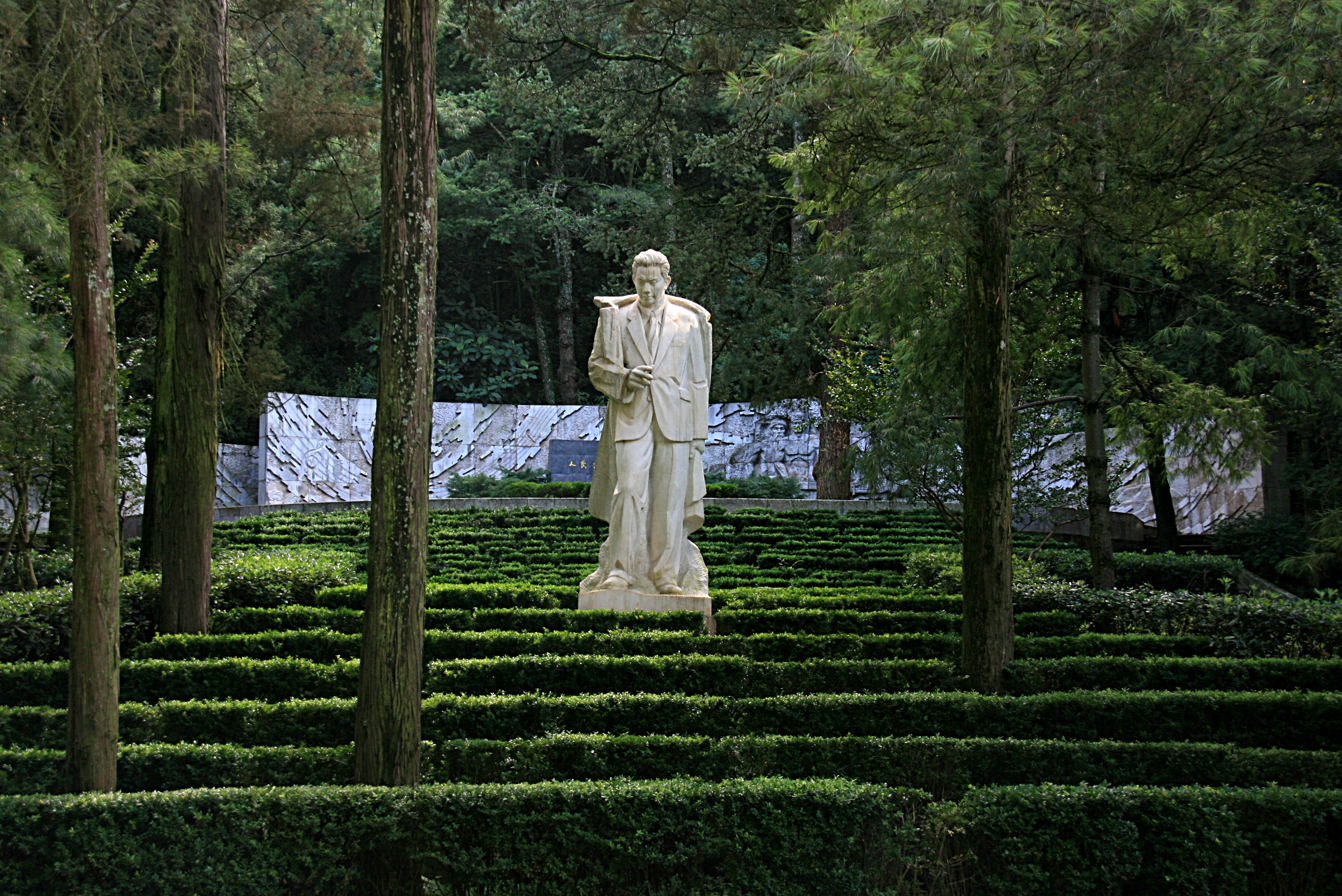
Nie Er's Tomb, with his statue, in Xishan Forest Park beside Dian Lake, Kunming

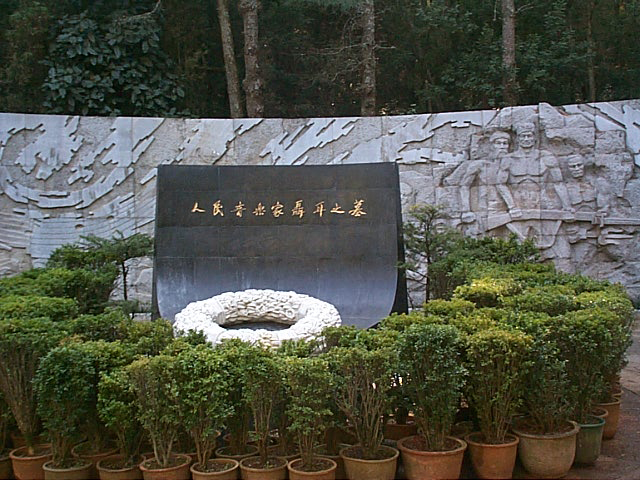
Nie Er's Tomb (聶耳墓; pinyin: Niè Ěr mù)

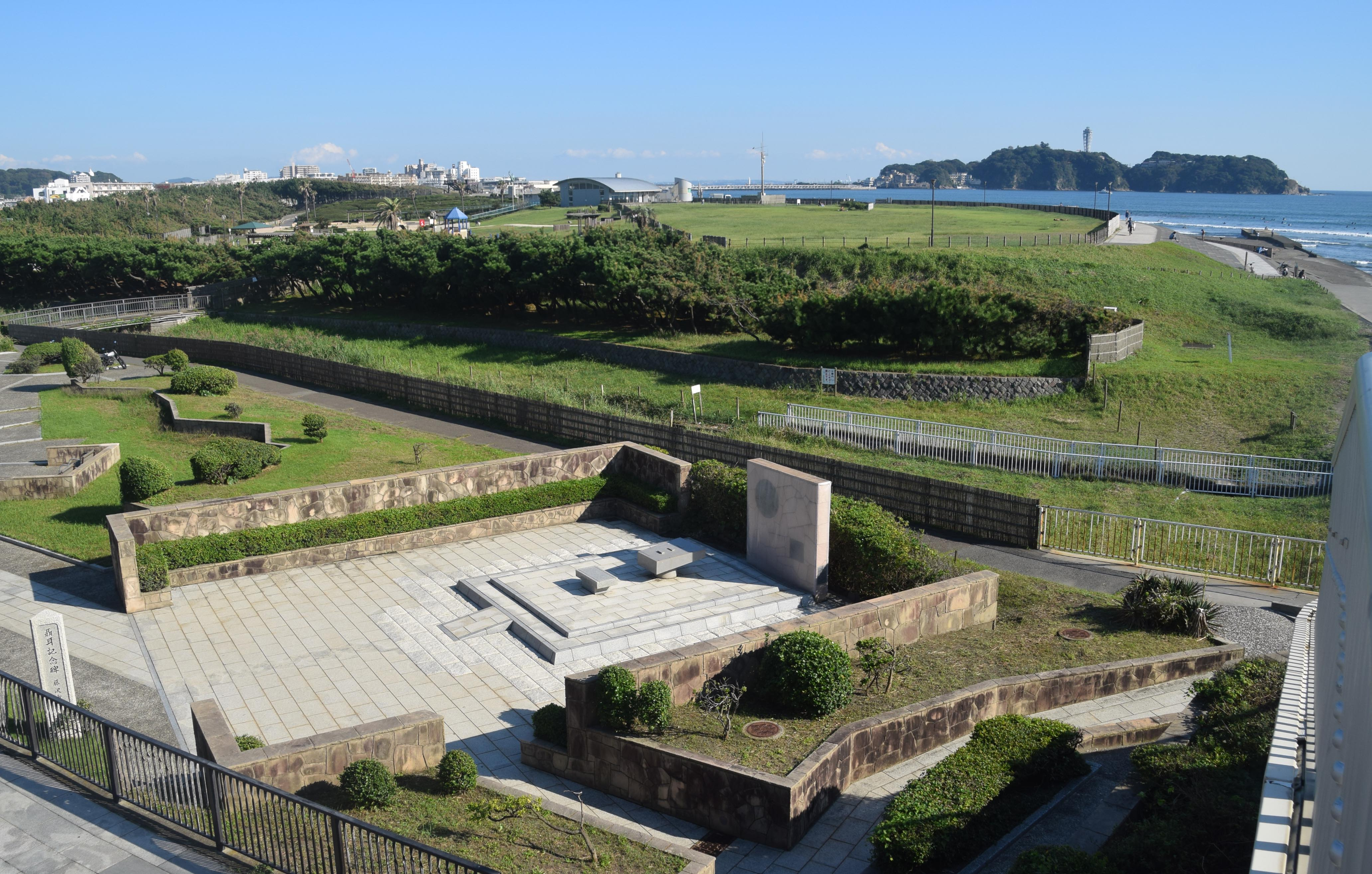
Nie Er Memorial Square in Fujisawa, Kanagawa, Japan

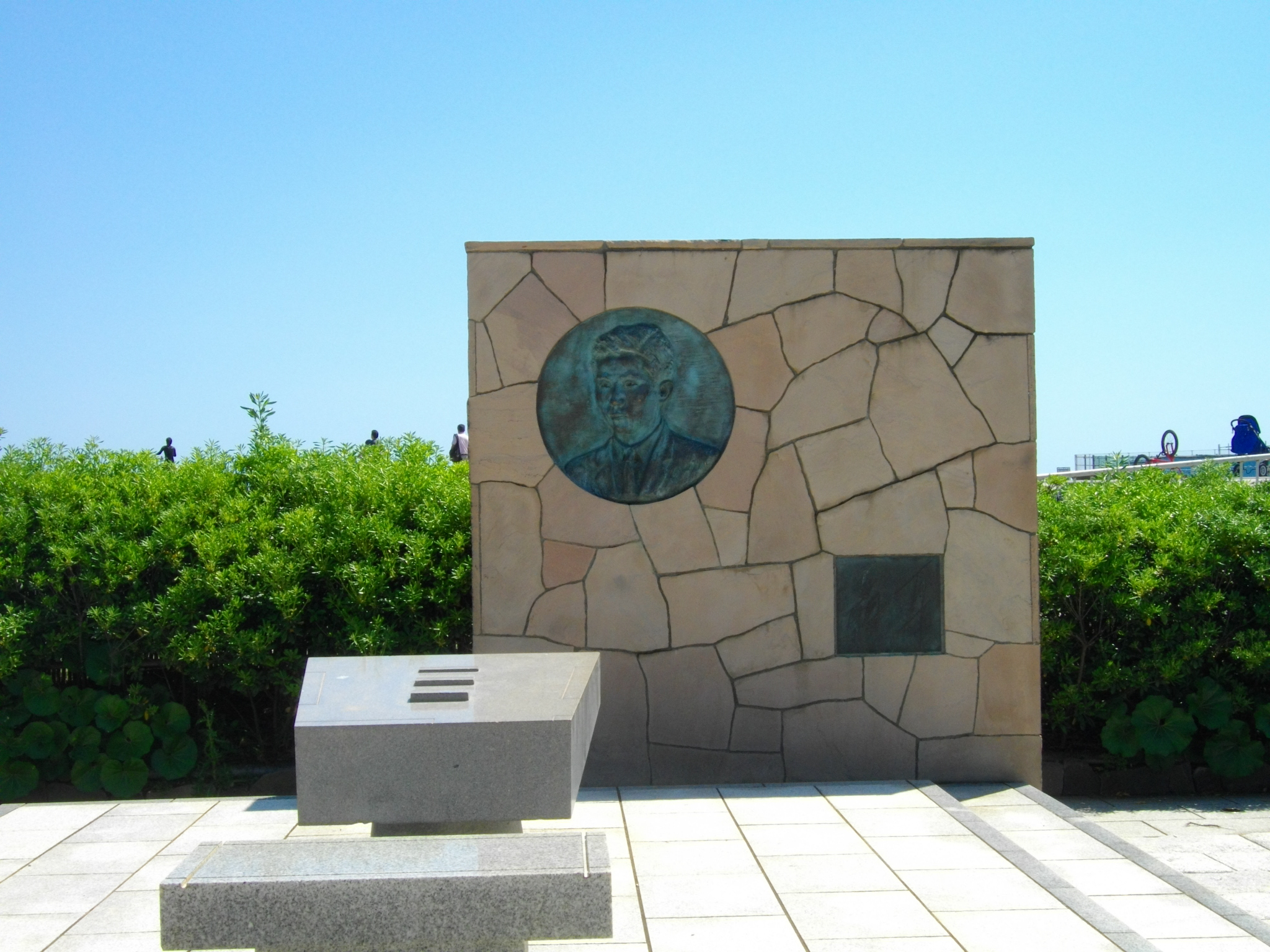
Nie Er Memorial in Nie Er Memorial Square

== Quotes ==
- Zhou Enlai (first premier of China): "Many youngsters were going to the revolution by singing songs of Xian Xinghai and Nie Er. They are the great musicians."
- Zhu De (Chinese general): "He is a musician of the people."
- Guo Moruo (writer): "Nie Er, the horn of the Chinese revolution, the drum of People's liberation, and his March of the Volunteers have already been regarded as Chinese Anthem. This song always triggers people's patriotism, and it also raises morale with its solemnity. As well as our national flag, Nie Er is immortal."
- Xia Yan (playwright): "Though Nie Er only worked for two years in Shanghai, he still wrote tons of well-known music, which are better for promoting anti-Japanese national salvation movement. Many people are going to the war by singing these songs."
- Tian Han (playwright): "The reason Nie Er's works are proliferated so fast is due to his enthusiasm on politics. His intention for composing is not for making music, but he is standing among the miserable people to shout out his anger and request. His work tightly combines the revolutionary world view and progressive innovative method together, which is certainly the invincible for art innovation.
- Xian Xinghai (composer): "His songs are aggressive, he wants to awaken people by using his songs. His songs are anti-imperialism, anti-feudalism, and anti-warlordism, which are landmark for China. His songs can reflect people's requests, so that can be accepted and sang by millions people. He is the founder of Chinese new music. Many people say that he still need more professional cultivation on musical skills, which is not right. From his hard-working and achievements, I can say that he has already exceeded many so-called "master musician" and "professional composer". Because of his modesty, he has already surpassed many nominal 'musicians'."
- He Luting (composer): "That Nie Er passed away so young is a big loss for China's musical landscape. However, his contributions to the civil revolution are significant, which are the pride of China's musical landscape. Nie Er is immortalized."

== See also ==
- Musical nationalism
- Ren Guang
- Lü Ji (composer)
- Xian Xinghai
