= Ren Guang =

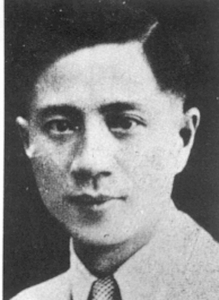
Ren Guang

A performance of Colorful Clouds Chasing the Moon

Ren Guang (Chinese: 任光, romanized: Rén Guāng; Yale romanization: Rén Gwāng; November 9, 1900 in Zhejiang – January 1941), also known by a pen name, Ren Qianfa (Chinese: 任前发), was a noted Chinese composer of the early 20th century.

Ren studied in Paris beginning in 1919, and there acquired the techniques of music composition. As a consequence, his works are influenced by Western music, particularly in their harmonic accompaniment. He returned to China c. 1928 and worked at Baidai Record Company.

Among his best-known compositions are Colorful Clouds Chasing the Moon (彩雲追月, Cǎi yún zhuī yuè), composed in 1935 for Chinese instrumental ensemble and transcribed for piano in 1975, and Song of the Fishermen (渔光曲, Yú guāng qǔ), used as the theme song for a namesake film.

Other films for which he provided songs include Kangdi ge (Resisting the Enemy), Dadi xingjunqu (Great World March), Yue guangguang (Bright, bright moon) and Wang laowu (Wang Five). He invited the musician Huang Yijun to compose The Flowers are Blooming and the Moon is Full (花好月圆) which was included on a 1935 recording Ren Guang supervised.

After another research trip to France, where he set up a Chinese choir, he returned home in 1938 to concentrate on anti-Japanese propaganda with the opera Hong bo qu (Turbulent Waves) and Gaoliang hong le (The Sorghum is Red). He went to Southeast Asia in 1939 to assist the National Salvation Movement and in 1940 he worked as composer for the New Fourth Army, for which he wrote Xin Si Jun dongjin qu (The New Fourth Army marches east).

He died in the Wannan Incident (also called the New Fourth Army Incident, during the Second Sino-Japanese War) in Wannan, southern Anhui, in January 1941.

== See also ==
- Nie Er
- Lü Ji (composer)
- Xian Xinghai
- He Lüding
