= Ingrid Sala Santamaria =

Ingrid Sala de Santamaría
- Birth name: Ingrid Sala Blanco
- Born: 1940; Cebu City, Commonwealth of the Philippines
- Genres: Classical
- Occupation: Concert pianist
- Instrument: Piano
- Spouse: José Santamaría

Ingrid Sala de Santamaría is a Filipina pianist.

== Artist Profile ==
Born in Cebu City, Philippines to Salvador Sala Escaño and María del Pilar Blanco Padilla, Ingrid Sala de Santamaría received her Bachelor of Music degree from the Battig Piano School in Cebu under her mother. Further studies followed at the Juilliard School in New York under Josef Raieff. She received a master's degree from Sta. Isabel College in Manila. De La Salle University conferred on her the Doctor of Music degree in Music Education, honoris causa, in 2006.

As chair of the Salvador and Pilar Sala Foundation, Inc. (SPSFI), Santamaria spearheaded a Ten-Year Music Development program which produced the Cebu Youth Symphony Orchestra (CYSO) in 1995 evolving into the Peace Philharmonic Philippines (PPP) in 2000. The young and deserving music scholars who have graduated from this endeavor have since reaped honors nationally while SPSFI continues their training and performance initiatives, PPP being the only orchestra group south of Manila.

Among honors received by Santamaria are: the Hall of Fame award from the Performing Arts League in Crestwood, Florida, USA; "Who is Who" in Asia documentary feature by NHK Television, Japan; "One of the 100 Most Notable Cebuanos of the Century" award; and from the French government; Chevalier, Ordre des Palmas Academiques; and Chevalier, Ordre du Merite Nationale.

At present, Santamaria is initiating a new music genre, that of a Piano Concerto soloist complemented by a string quartet. She has had several concerts in Manila and Cebu with the PPP String Quartet in the last 2 years.

== Concert Engagements ==
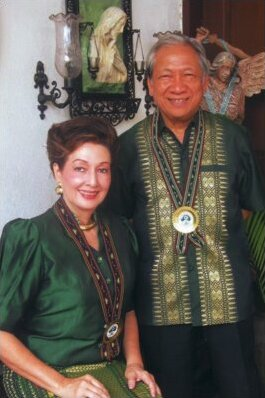
Ingrid Sala de Santamaría and Prof. Reynaldo G. Reyes.

Together with Professor Reynaldo G. Reyes, Sala de Santamaria has been touring the Philippines every two years, since 2001, performing concertos, with a mission of bringing live classical music to the countryside. She is the soloist while Reyes plays the orchestral part on the second piano.
