= China National Symphony Orchestra =

PRC's national orchestra

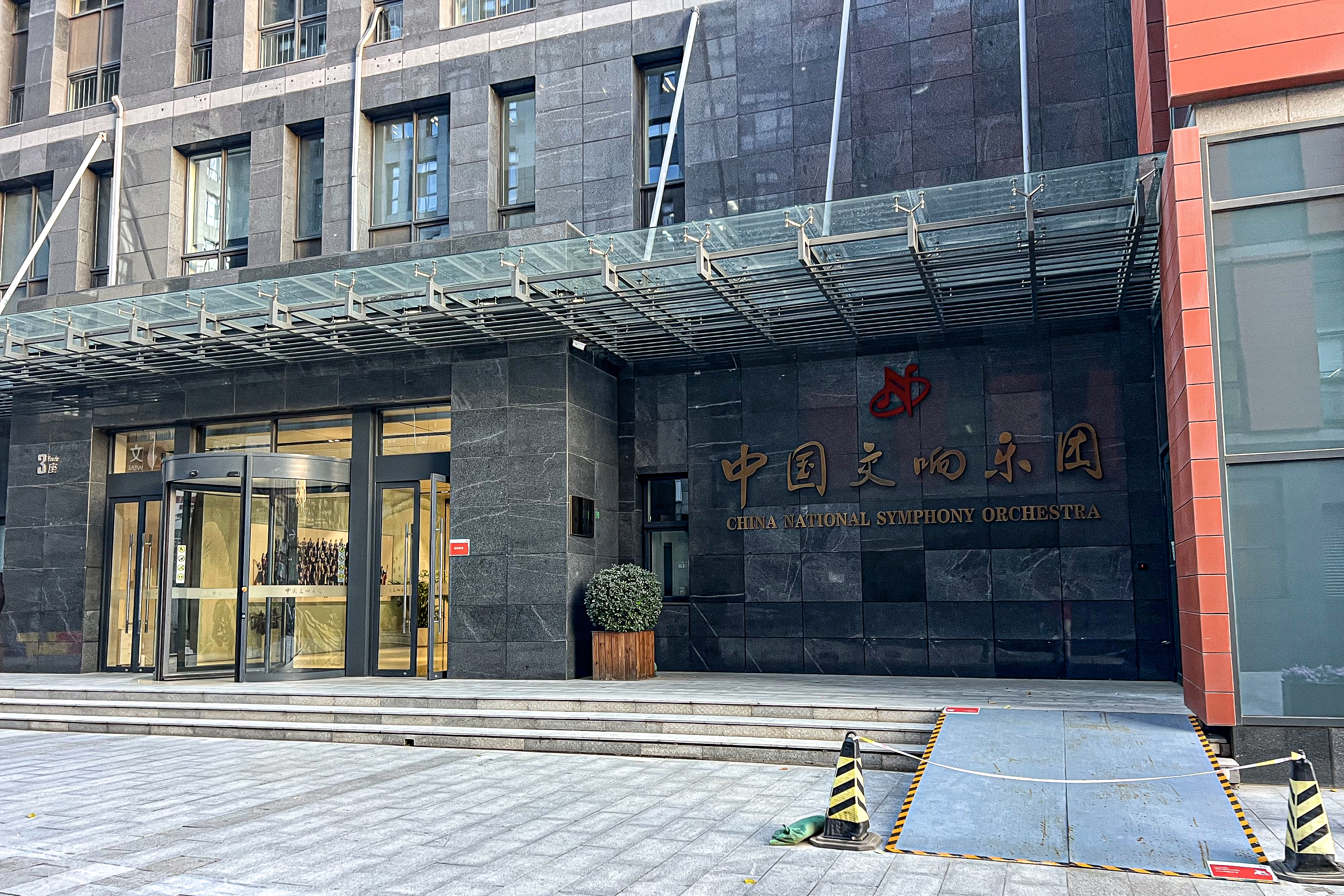
Headquarters

The China National Symphony Orchestra (Chinese: 中国国家交响乐团; pinyin: Zhōngguó Guójiā Jiāoxiǎng Yuètuán; abbreviated CNSO) is the national orchestra of the People's Republic of China.

It was founded as the Central Philharmonic Orchestra of China (CPOC) in 1956 under the baton of the conductor Li Delun. In 1996, it was restructured and renamed the China National Symphony Orchestra.

Xia Guan is the orchestra's executive director. The orchestra's principal conductor is Michel Plasson, principal resident conductor is Xincao Li, Muhai Tang is the conductor laureate and En Shao is the principal guest conductor.

== History ==
=== Founding and first concert ===
Li Delun conducted the first concert in Beijing in commemoration of the 200th anniversary of the birth of Wolfgang Amadeus Mozart after the founding of CPOC. On October 1, 1959, the concert of Beethoven's Ninth Symphony was performed by the orchestra in Beijing, and all the musicians were Chinese. In 1996, the Central Philharmonic was restructured and renamed the CNSO. At that time, the CNSO not only played much western classical music such as Beethoven, Brahms, Tchaikovsky, and Wagner, but it also introduced many works such as Yellow River Cantata by Chinese composers.

=== First director ===
According to ChinaCulture website, the CNSO's first director, Delun Li, born in 1917, was a famous musician and conductor in China. He graduated from the Shanghai Conservatory in 1943, and he studied in the Moscow Conservatory from 1953 to 1957. He conducted over twenty orchestras throughout the former USSR. In the fall of 1957, he returned to China to be Conductor and Artistic Director of the CNSO. Delun Li, as a guest conductor, toured Spain, Germany, Canada, and the United States. He introduced many Chinese composers' works abroad, for example, The Yellow River Cantata and Song of Mountain Forest. He was awarded the Liszt Memory Medal by the Ministry of Culture and Education of Hungary in 1986, and in 1997, he was awarded the National Medal of Friendship by President Yeltsin of Russia.

=== Beijing Concert Hall ===
The Beijing Concert Hall was founded as the Center Cinema in 1927. It was rebuilt for the CNSO in 1960 on the Beixinhuajie in Xicheng District which is on the south of Liubukou. The Beijing Concert Hall can accommodate an audience of up to 1,024 people.

=== Reform era ===
During the era of Reform and Opening Up, the CPOC was the first unit of the Ministry of Culture to earn its own money, doing so by recording movie sound tracks.

=== As CNSO ===
CNSO was reconstituted from the Central Philharmonic Orchestra of China in 1996.

== Executive head ==
Currently, Xia Guan, a famous composer, is the executive head of the CNSO. He was born in Henan Province. He graduated from the Department of Composition of the China Central Conservatory of Music and played the violin and erhu. Before being the director of the CNSO, he was the director of the Opera Company at the China Opera and Dance Drama Theatre. Also, he was vice director of the China Oriental Song and Dance Ensemble. He has composed a number of songs which leave a deep impression on the audience. His operatic symphony Mulan Psalm was first performed in Beijing in 2004 and at the Lincoln Center in New York in 2005. "One year later it was the first Chinese opera to be conducted by a foreign conductor, Michael Helmrath, to be played by a foreign orchestra- the Brandenburg Symphony Orchestra and to be sung by foreign artists in Chinese". Guan's main compositions include: Fantasies Symphoniques: Farewell My Concubine (2005), the Chinese opera Sorrowful Morning, and Mulan Psalm.

== Principal conductors ==
The current conductors of CNSO include the French conductor Michel Plasson who was nominated as the Principal Conductor of the CNSO in March 2010. Tang Muhai is the laureate conductor. Xincao Li is the principal resident conductor, Shao En is the principal guest conductor, Xieyang Chen is the guest conductor, and Yunzhi Liu is the concertmaster.

The first principal conductor and artistic director Zuohuang Chen came back from USA and built the CNSO based on the original CPOC. During Chen's tenure during 1996 and 2000, CNSO was believed the best orchestra in China at that time. However, Chen did not accept the contract renewal in 2000 even though CNSO hoped he could continue. The famous conductor Muhai Tang took over the artistic director but left the position one year later without formal resignation due to the conflicts with the executive Songlin Yu. There was no principal conductor or artistic director in CNSO until En Shao took the position in 2006. Shao was in the position for one season only and served as guest conductor afterwards. Finally in 2010, CNSO the 4th principal conductor Michel Plass started to lead CNSO, but he has not been with the title artistic director.

== Diplomatic occasions (2011) ==
- In April 2011, the CNSO performed for Hu Jintao, Russian President Medvedev, and other leaders who attended the third BRICS summit.
- In April 2011, the CNSO performed for the leaders who were at Boao Forum for Asia Annual Conference 2011.
- On August 18, 2011, the CNSO performed for the US Vice President Joe Biden, the Chinese Vice President Xi Jinping, and other government officials in the Great Hall of the People.
- On August 26, 2011, the CNSO performed for the ambassadors from different countries at the Ministry of Foreign Affairs.

== See also ==
- Wu Yili, the first solo pianist of the orchestra
