= Daniel Z. Epstein =

American lawyer (born 1983)

- Born: Daniel Zachary Epstein; 1983 (age 42–43); Houston, Texas, U.S.
- Education: Kenyon College (BA); Emory University (JD); George Washington University (PhD)

Signature
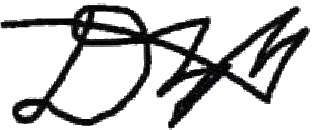

Daniel Z. Epstein (born 1983) is an American lawyer who served as Special Assistant to the President. He is a former nominee to be a Judge of the United States Court of Federal Claims. On January 13, 2021, he was appointed to a three-year term on the Council of the Administrative Conference of the United States.

== Education ==
Epstein earned his Bachelor of Arts, cum laude, from Kenyon College, and his Juris Doctor from the Emory University School of Law. Epstein received a PhD in Political Science from George Washington University.

== Legal career ==
Epstein began his career as a legal associate with the Charles Koch Foundation. From 2009–2011, he served as counsel for oversight and investigations for the United States House Committee on Oversight and Reform. In 2011, he founded the Cause of Action Institute, a 501(c)(3) public interest law firm, and served as its Executive Director and President of the Board until 2016. At Cause of Action, he represented pro bono clients in government investigations and litigated regulatory, constitutional, political, and public law matters. From 2016–2017, Epstein was a consultant for the Institute for Justice. Before joining the White House in January 2017, he was counsel to both the Presidential Transition Team and the Trump for President Campaign. He served as Special Assistant to the President and Senior Associate Counsel to the President from 2017–2020. He is currently the Director for Legal and Policy at Trust Ventures, a Texas-based venture capital fund. Since January 2024, he has been a Vice President at America First Legal and was lead attorney in the lawsuit America First Legal Foundation v. Roberts et al. that sought to establish that the Judicial Conference of the United States and the Administrative Office of the U.S. Courts are properly to be considered Executive Branch agencies. In June 2026, it was announced that Epstein had been named Interim Dean of Florida International University College of Law.

== Withdrawn nomination to Court of Federal Claims ==
On June 19, 2019, President Trump announced his intent to nominate Epstein to serve as a judge of the United States Court of Federal Claims. On June 24, 2019, his nomination was sent to the Senate. President Trump nominated Epstein to the seat vacated by Judge Edward J. Damich, who took senior status on October 22, 2013. On January 3, 2020, his nomination was returned to the President under Rule XXXI, Paragraph 6 of the United States Senate. On February 4, 2020, he was renominated to the same seat. On December 17, 2020, his prior nomination was withdrawn as he was nominated by President Trump to be the Chairman of the Administrative Conference of the United States.

== Expired nomination to Administrative Conference of the United States ==
On December 17, 2020, President Donald Trump nominated Epstein to be the Chairman of the Administrative Conference of the United States for a term of five years after Paul R. Verkuil's term expired. On January 3, 2021, his nomination was returned to the President under Rule XXXI, Paragraph 6 of the United States Senate.

== Memberships ==
He has been a member of the Federalist Society since 2006. Epstein is an Eagle Scout.
