= Xian Xinghai =

Chinese classical composer (1905–1945)

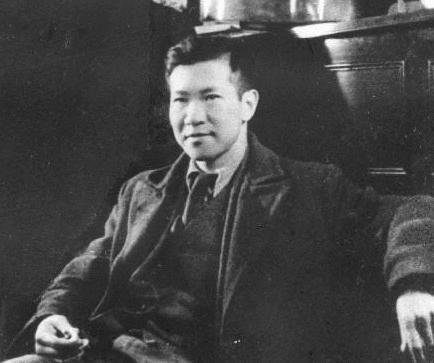
- Xian Xinghai in the 1920s, at about 23 years of age
- Born: 13 June 1905; Portuguese Macau
- Died: 30 October 1945 (aged 40); Moscow, Soviet Union
- Other names: Sinn Sing Hoi, Huang Xun
- Occupation: Composer
- Years active: 1929–1945

Xian Xinghai or Sinn Sing Hoi (Chinese: 冼星海; pinyin: Xiǎn Xīnghǎi; Wade–Giles: Hsien Hsing-hai; Yale Romanization: Syǎn Syīng-Hǎi; 13 June 1905 – 30 October 1945) was a Chinese composer. He was among the first composers in his country to draw on western classical music and has influenced many later Chinese musicians. Xian composed in the major musical forms (two symphonies, a violin concerto, four large scale choral works, nearly 300 songs and an opera), and is best known for the Yellow River Cantata upon which the Yellow River Piano Concerto is based.

== Early life and education ==
Xian was born in Portuguese Macau in 1905, to Tanka parents whose ancestors were from Panyu, Guangdong. He moved frequently in his early life with his mother as his father had died before Xian was born. Xian moved with his mother to Singapore when he was six years old, he was enrolled in Yangzheng Primary School for his primary education. It was while at Yangzheng Primary School that he took his first step into his musical career. His teacher, Ou Jianfu, first noticed Xian Xinghai's musical talent, and he was enrolled into the school's military band. Xian received training in both musical instruments as well as musical theory. He was later brought to Guangzhou for further education by his then school principal, Lin Yaoxiang, along with 19 other students. Xian started learning the clarinet in 1918 at the YMCA charity school attached to the Lingnan University in Guangzhou (Canton).

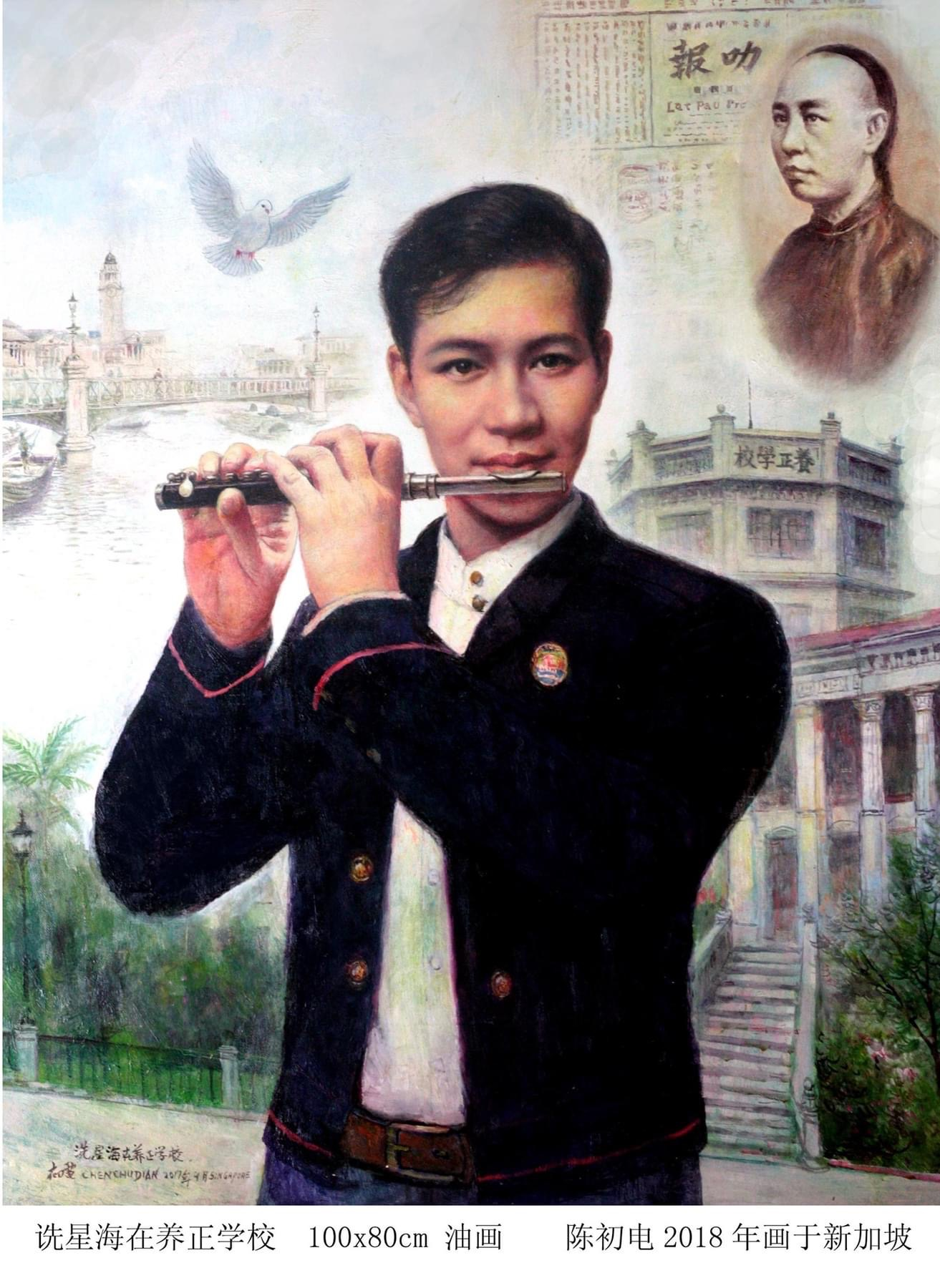
An oil painting of Chinese composer Xian Xinghai, painted by Chinese artist Chen Chudian

In 1924 he studied in Saint Andrew's School of Singapore. In 1926 he joined the National Music Institute at Peking University to study music and in 1928 he entered National Shanghai Conservatory of Music to study violin and piano. The same year he published his well-known essay The Universal Music. In 1929 he went to Paris (where he met Ma Sicong who introduced him to many artists there) and in 1934 became the first Chinese student to be admitted to the Paris Conservatory to study senior composition with Paul Dukas; prior to this, he had studied with Vincent d'Indy. During this period he composed Wind, Song of a Wanderer, Violin Sonata in D minor, and other works.

== Career ==
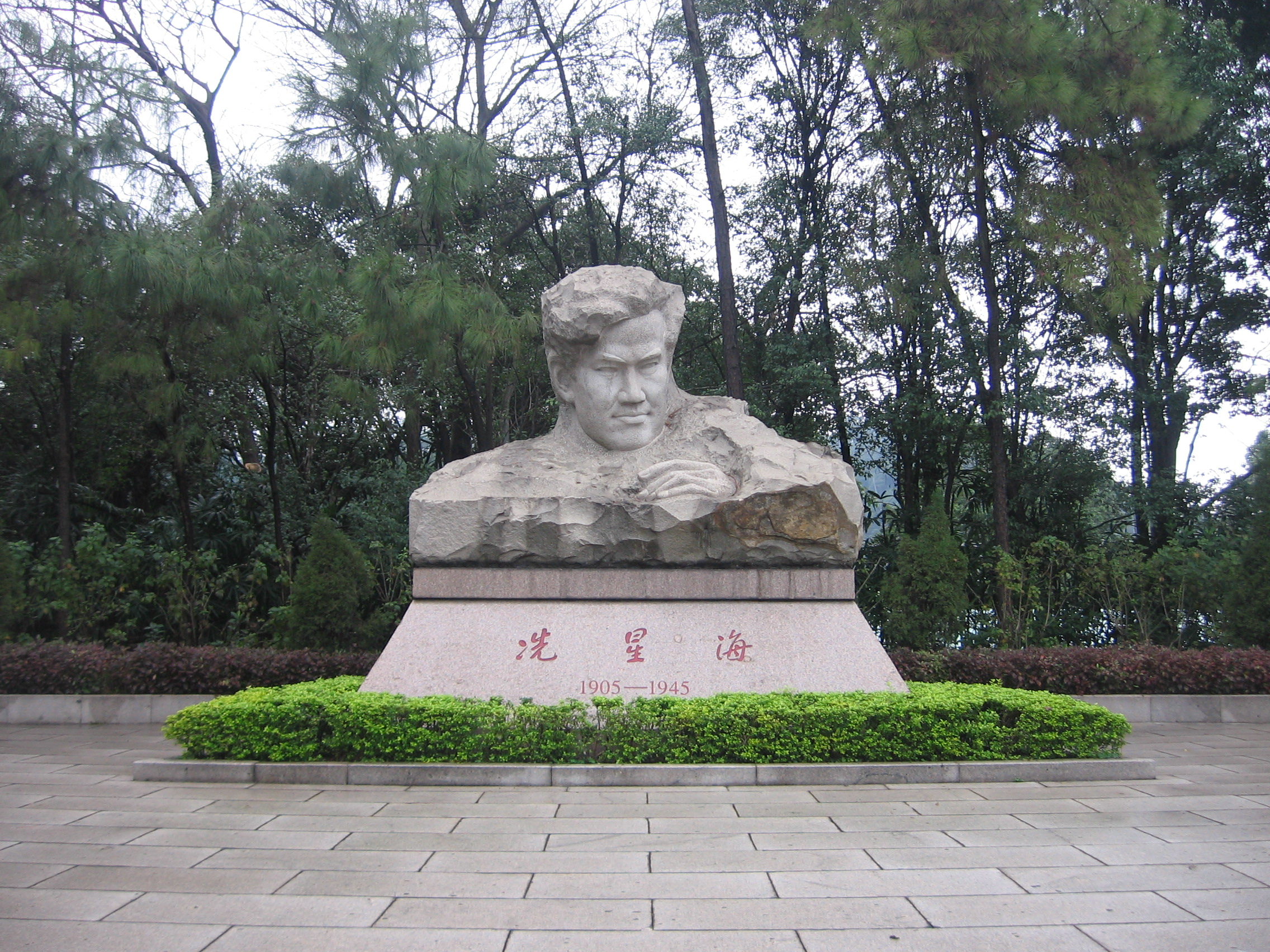
Xian's tomb

Xian returned to the Republic of China in 1935 to the Japanese occupied part of the country (known then as Manchuria). Using his music as a weapon to protest the occupation, he took part in patriotic activities. During the Second Sino-Japanese War (1937–1945), he wrote vocal works that encouraged the people to fight the Japanese invaders, including Saving the Nation, Non-Resistance the Only Fear, Song of Guerrillas, The Roads Are Opened by Us, The Vast Siberia, Children of the Motherland, Go to the Homefront of the Enemy, and On the Taihang Mountains, among others. He worked for film studios before going to the Communist headquarters in Yan'an, where he became dean of the Music Department at Lu Xun Institute of Arts in 1938. It is at this time that he composed the Yellow River Cantata and the Production Cantata.

In 1940, Xian used the assumed name Huang Xun. That year, Xian went to the Soviet Union to compose the score of the documentary film Yan'an and the Eighth Route Army. Before departure, Mao Zedong invited him to dinner. In 1941 the German invasion of the Soviet Union disrupted his work and he attempted to return to China by way of Xinjiang but the local warlord, Sheng Shicai, blocked the way and he got stranded in Almaty, Kazakhstan. It was here that he composed the symphonies Liberation of the Nation and Sacred War, the orchestral suite Red All Over the River and the Chinese Rhapsody for orchestra.

Xian composed more than 300 works and published 35 papers, including "Nie Er – the Creator of New Chinese Music".

== Works ==
- Symphony No. 1 "Liberation of the Nation", Op. 5 (1935/1941)
- Yellow River Cantata, Op. 7 (1939/1941)
- Production Cantata, Op. 8 (1939)
- Suite No. 4 "Man Jiang Hong", Op. 15 (1943)
- Symphony No. 2 "Holy War", Op. 17 (1943)
- Chinese Rhapsody, Op. 26 (1945)

== Personal life ==
Xian developed pulmonary tuberculosis due to overwork and malnutrition. After the war, Xian returned to Moscow for medical treatment but died of pulmonary disease on 30 October 1945 at the age of 40.

== Legacy ==
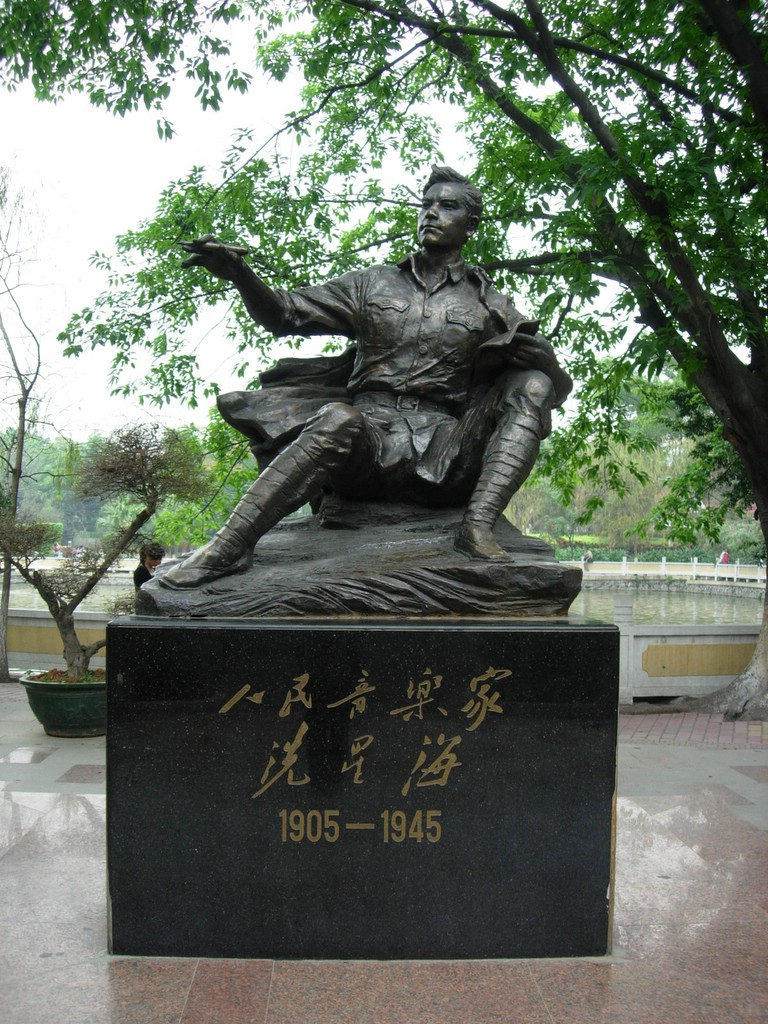
Statue of Xian

Xian's influence in Chinese music won him the title "People's Composer".

During the Cultural Revolution (1966–1976), when all the Western and some Chinese art was forbidden, the pianist Yin Chengzong arranged the Yellow River Cantata into a concerto for piano and orchestra, by the name of Yellow River Piano Concerto (1969).

After China opened its doors to the world in the late 1970s, Yin planned the performance of the piano concerto. There was a debate whether some politically incorrect anthems like "The East Is Red", which Yin interpolated into the concerto, should be removed. It was decided that the work itself was a cultural legacy of the time when it was created, the melodies reminding listeners of that period and creating a unique sense of history. Hence, the work remained intact as it was originally arranged.

Beginning in the 1970s, the Yellow River Concerto has been heard in the West, often performed by Yin Chengzong himself, and in 1988 the Italian pianist Riccardo Caramella became the first Western pianist who performed it in China with a Chinese orchestra, the Beijing Radio Symphony Orchestra.

In 2009, the epic film The Star and the Sea was created by directors Qiankuan Li and Guiyun Xiao, featuring actors Vivian Hsu, Alec Su, and Chen Kun. The film is about the hard childhood and suffering of Xian in that period of his life and the efforts of his mother to help him developing his musical talents. In 2011, the film won the Huabiao Film Award for Outstanding Children's Film.

In May 2019, a movie titled The Composer directed by Xierzhati Yahefu was released. The movie relates Xian's life story from 1941, when he was in Moscow, to his death in 1945.

The National Centre for the Performing Arts in Beijing presented his life as a contemporary dance drama.

== Memorials ==
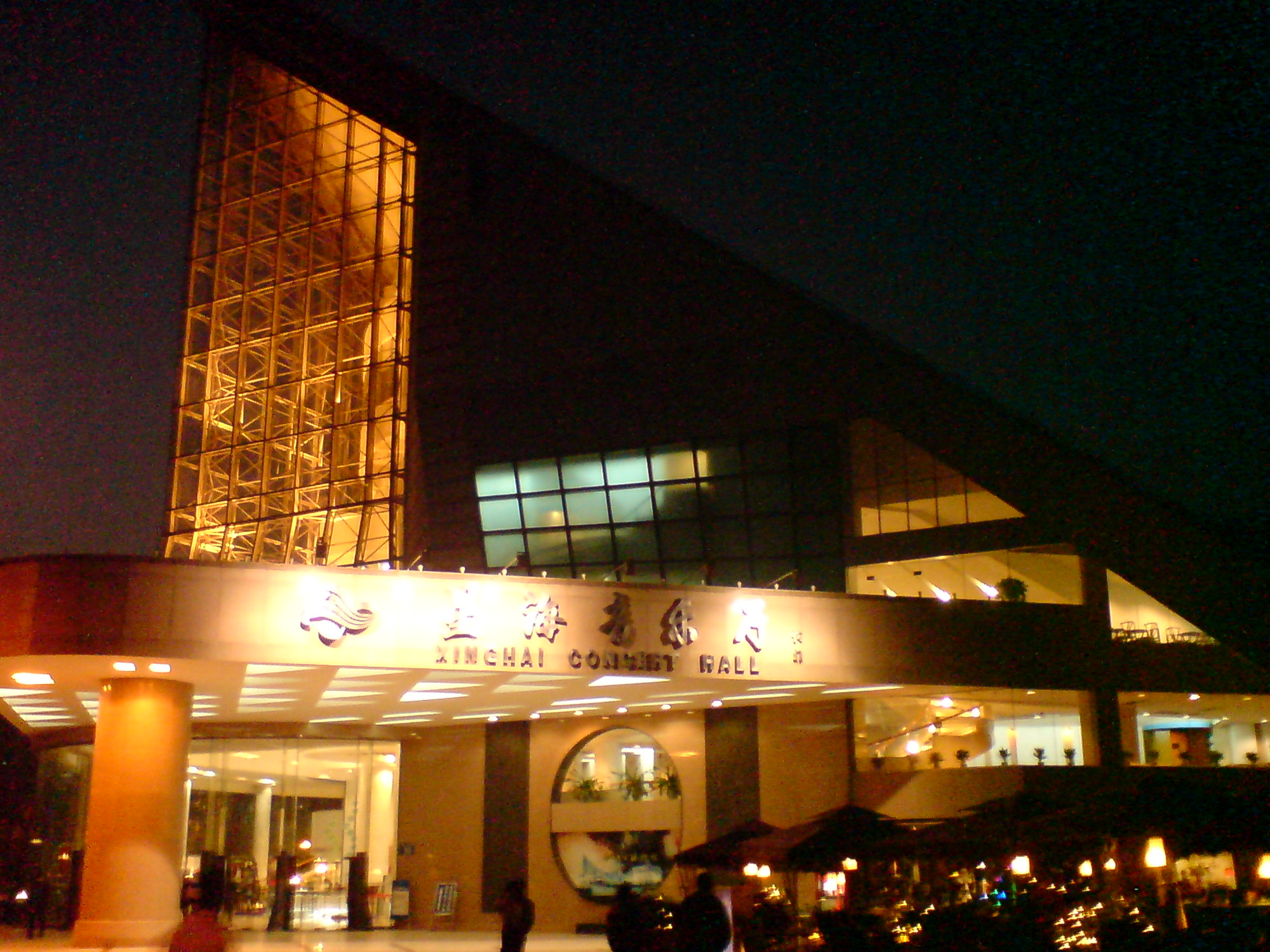
Xinghai Concert Hall

- Both the Xinghai Conservatory of Music and the Xinghai Concert Hall in Guangzhou are named after Xian.
- A statue of Xian has been erected in People's Park of central Guangzhou.
- A 3-meter-high statue of Xian was erected at the intersection of Avenida Xian Xing Hai and Rua de Berlim streets in Macau to commemorate the 100th anniversary of his birth.
- The avenue Avenida Xian Xing Hai in Macau is named after him.
- A street in Almaty, Kazakhstan, is named after Xian Xinghai.

== See also ==
- Index of Macau-related articles
- Ren Guang
- Lü Ji (composer)
- He Luting
