= Li Huanzhi =

Li Huanzhi 李焕之
- Born: 2 January 1919; Hong Kong, China
- Died: 19 March 2000 (aged 81) Beijing, China
- Genres: Chinese classical

Li Huanzhi (simplified Chinese: 李焕之; traditional Chinese: 李煥之; pinyin: Lihuànzhī), originally Li Zhaocai (Chinese: 李昭彩; pinyin: Li zhāocǎi), also known as Li Zhonghuan (simplified Chinese: 李钟焕; traditional Chinese: 李鍾煥; pinyin: Li zhōnghuàn) (2 January 1919 – 19 March 2000), was a Chinese classical composer of the 20th century. Born in Hong Kong, his ancestors came from Jinjiang City, Quanzhou, Fujian, and his mother was Taiwanese.

== Biography ==
Li studied in several primary and middle schools in Hong Kong, Xiamen, and Quanzhou from 1925 to 1935. In 1936 he entered the National Music College in Shanghai to learn harmony from Xiao Youmei.

In 1938, Li went to Yan'an, where he studied at the Music Department of Lu Xun Arts College. After completing the courses, he later studied composing and conducting with Xian Xinghai. Following his graduation he remained there as a faculty member.

After the Second Sino-Japanese War, Li went to Zhangjiakou to take the chair of the music department of North China Associated University. Since the founding of the People's Republic of China, Li was appointed as the master of music working party of the Central Conservatory of Music, the art director of the Central Ensemble of Songs and Dances, the master of the China Central Chinese Orchestra, etc.

In 1985, he was elected as the chairman of the Chinese Musicians' Association.

He had three sons with his wife, Li Qun: Li Dakang, Li Xiaokang, and Li Yikang. Li Dakang is a professional DJ.

He died in Beijing in 2000.

== Notable works ==
Here are some of Li's notable works:

- Spring Festival Overture (春节序曲/春節序曲)
- Nomad Flute (胡笳吟)
- High Mountains, Flowing Water (高山流水)
- Socialism is Good (社会主义好/社會主義好)
- Shepherd Elegy (牧羊哀歌)
- Yellow Flowers (黄花曲)
- Guard Our Motherland (保卫祖国/保衛祖國)
- Ode to the Youth (青年颂|青年頌)
- March of Victory (simplified Chinese: 民主建国进行曲/胜利进行曲; traditional Chinese: 民主建國進行曲/勝利進行曲)
- Su Wu (苏武/蘇武)
- Fantasia Miluo River (汨罗江幻想曲/汨羅江幻想曲)
