= Liu Zhuang (musician) =

Chinese composer

Liu Zhuang (Chinese: 刘庄; pinyin: Liú Zhuāng; October 24, 1932 – June 30, 2011) was a Chinese composer. She was born in Shanghai, and studied piano with her father as a child in Hangzhou. She graduated in composition from the Shanghai Conservatory of Music, where she studied with Ding Shande, Sang Tong and Den Erjing. She continued her studies with Guroff in Russia.

After completing her studies, Liu taught music at the Shanghai Conservatory and then moved to Beijing, where she taught at the Central Conservatory of Music in Beijing. She also served as composer for the Central Philharmonic Society of Beijing. From 1989 to 2003, she was scholar-in-residence and music teacher at Syracuse University. She appeared as herself in the 1988 documentary A Tale of the Wind.

== Works ==
Selected works include:

- The Yellow River Concerto
- Living Waters, choral
- Wind Through Pines, for flute, cello & prepared piano
- Three Chinese Songs
- Yimeng Mountain Ditty

Her works have been recorded and issued on CD, including:

- American Masters for the 21st Century (January 1, 2004) Innova

Her music has been used on film soundtracks, including:

- Une Histoire De Vent
