= List of Chinese musicians =

The following is a list of Chinese musicians:

- Dao Lang (musician), Male Singer, Chinese Traditional Music Composer, Lyricist, Arranger, Producer
- Dong Yaqian, Male Singer, rock artist
- Xu Wei (musician), male singer, rock musician
- Huo Zun, male singer, artist, composer
- Eason Chan, a male singer from Hong Kong
- Wang Leehom, male singer
- Chan Wing-wah, composer
- Chen Jiafeng, violinist
- Christopher Loh, singer
- Gao Hong, pipa player and composer
- Ch'eng Mao-yün, violinist and composer
- Jacky Cheung, Cantopop singer
- Leslie Cheung, singer
- Chou Wen-chung, Chinese-born U.S. composer (b. 1923)
- Cui Jian, a rock musician
- Dou Wei, a rock musician
- Du Mingxin, composer
- Fou Ts'ong, pianist
- Shengying Gu, pianist
- Anna Guo, yang-qin player
- Guo Yue, dizi player
- He Yong, rock musician
- Ayi Jihu, singer
- Jin, Chinese American rapper
- Aaron Kwok, Cantopop singer
- Leon Lai, Cantopop singer
- George Lam, Cantopop singer, singer–songwriter, music producer, and actor
- Larissa Lam, Singer, Songwriter
- Sunny Lam, singer–songwriter
- Terence Lam, singer–songwriter
- William Tete Luo, a pianist from Beijing
- Lan Shui, conductor
- Lang Lang, pianist
- Andy Lau, Cantopop singer
- Gigi Leung, Hong Kong Cantopop singer and actress
- Herman Li, guitarist of DragonForce
- Li Yundi, pianist
- Liu Fang, pipa player
- Liu Qi-Chao, jazz musician
- Liu Sola, singer, composer
- Liu Tianhua, composer
- Yang Liu, classical violinist
- Liu Yifei, singer
- Only Won, Chinese American rapper
- Yo-Yo Ma, cellist
- Karen Mok, Hong Kong–based actress and singer-songwriter
- Hou Muren, rock musician
- Qu Xiaosong, composer
- Chino Rodriguez, salsa musician, composer, and producer
- Sa Dingding, folk singer–songwriter
- Shen Sinyan, music director and classical composer
- Shenyang, bass-baritone
- Bright Sheng, composer
- Lane Shi Otayonii, vocalist and sound designer
- Stefanie Sun, Chinese Singaporean singer
- Sun Yingdi, pianist
- Tan Dun, composer
- Melvyn Tan, pianist (fortepiano)
- Muhai Tang, conductor
- Teresa Teng, singer
- The8 (Xu Minghao), member of Seventeen
- Tian Zhen
- Twelve Girls Band
- Wang Jian, cellist
- Wang Yuja, pianist
- Wen Junhui, member of Seventeen
- Wing Yee, guitarist and singer–songwriter
- Faye Wong, singer
- Di Xiao, Classical Pianist
- Wu Fei, composer, guzheng performer, vocalist
- Xian Xinghai, composer
- Xin Huguang, composer
- Rainie Yang, Taiwanese singer and actress
- Yang Xuefei, guitarist
- Youxin Yang, songwriter
- Ye Xiaogang, composer
- Lai Ying Tong, a songwriter from Hong Kong
- Kris Wu, ex-Exo member
- Lu Han, ex-Exo member
- Huang Zitao, ex-Exo member
- Li Wenhan, Uniq/Unine member, soloist
- Lay Zhang, Exo member
- Lai Guanlin, ex-Wanna One member
- Xiaojun, NCT member
- Song Yaxuan, Teens in Times member
- Song Yuqi, (G)I-dle member
- Ningning, aespa member

== See also ==
- Chinese music
- Chinese Music Society of North America (CMSNA)
