= Wendy Chung (lyricist) =

C-Pop lyricist

Wendy Chung 鍾晴
- Born: 21 September 1986 (age 39)
- Occupation: lyricist
- Years active: 1986–present

Wendy Chung (Chinese: 鍾晴) is a Hong Kong pop and C-Pop lyricist, who was born in Hong Kong.

== Biography ==
Chung attended Hennessy Road State primary school and True Light Middle School of Hong Kong, obtaining a B.Sc. in Statistics from the University of Auckland, New Zealand.

In 2006, Cheung worked with a number of friends, including Hong Kong writer Ray Leung, to organise a concert in the Hong Kong Science Museum.

Later in her career, Chung was invited by the producer of boyband C AllStar to collaborate on their singles 我們的電車上 (Our Tram) and 天梯 (Ladder). Ladder was in the top 5 of the RTHK Top 10 Gold Songs, CASH Golden Sail Music Awards, and IFPI Top Ten digital best-selling songs, along with other nominations and awards. As of November 2017, the original MV YouTube video for Ladder has over 17 million views, making it the original Hong Kong Cantonese video with the most YouTube hits. During her career, Chung has also written lyrics for a number of Hong Kong musicians, including Julian Cheung, William So, Twins, Vincy Chan, Shirley Kwan, Jason Chan, Pakho Chau and Kate Tsui.
