= Wen Kezheng =

Chinese singer

- Born: 17 February 1929; Beiping, Republic of China
- Died: 19 April 2007 (aged 78); Beijing, China
- Occupations: Singer, educator
- Years active: 1950–2007
- Spouse: Wang Qiu
- Children: 1

Wen Kezheng (traditional Chinese: 溫可錚; simplified Chinese: 温可铮; Tongyong Pinyin: Wen Ke-Zheng; Wade–Giles: Wen Ke-Zheng, 1929–2007) was a Chinese operatic bass and music educator. Known for his rich and deep voice, he has been known as the "Chinese Chaliapin" and dubbed by the domestic classical music community as the "King of Basses". As an educator, he is best known for his long-time association with the Shanghai Conservatory of Music and headed the Department of Vocal Music and Opera. He also served as the fourth director of the Chinese Musicians' Association.

== Early life and education ==
Wen Kezheng was born to an intellectual family in Beiping. His first foray into singing was at a competition when he was ten. As a high school student, he was first drawn to Western classical music after watching Si Yigui performing at a concert; the pair would eventually cross paths in the future and Si continued to be a close friend and mentor to Wen. His music-loving father encouraged and nurtured his interest in opera. He pursued his studies at Nanjing National Conservatory (later merged with several other institutions to form Central Conservatory of Music) and graduated in 1950.

== Career ==
At Nanjing National Conservatory, Wen studied with Russian vocal professor Vladimir Shushlin, graduating in 1950. Unable to return home to Beijing due to the civil unrest, Wen was forced to remain in Nanjing and, through the recommendation of a friend, became the choir conductor at Gulou Christian Church (zh). Wu Yi-fang, then the president of Jinling Women's College and a church member, heard him sing and hired him to teach music at the college, where he met his future wife Wang Qiu. They moved to Shanghai in 1952 after he took up a teaching position at Shanghai Conservatory of Music, thus beginning a lifelong affiliation with the institution.

Wen continued a prolific career as a performer and established himself as a representative opera singer of the newly founded Republic. However, his career came to a halt due to the Cultural Revolution. Like many other fellow classical musicians, including soprano Zhou Xiaoyan, Wen and his wife were "sent down" and forced to leave Shanghai. The couple were sent to Fuyang, Anhui, then still a rural area mostly dependent on agriculture and light industry. Wen was forbidden to practice operatic singing, apparently because it was deemed "too Western". In a 2020 interview with Cao Kefan, Wang revealed that her husband resorted to shouting as a substitute for warming up his vocal cords. Another anecdote exists which tells of Wen finding various excuses to defy the Red Guards and practice singing, including rallying workers at the factory he was working at into singing patriotic songs; so popular was he with the other laborers that they protected him whenever the Red Guards tried to beat him up. When the ban on classical music was lifted, husband and wife returned to Shanghai and resumed performing together and teaching. They made their home in Jing'an District and would frequently welcome both conservatory students and some of the country's most illustrious classical musicians.

As a performer, Wen did not limit himself to only classical repertoire and often included folk songs and popular tunes in his repertoire, partly informed by his lifelong interest in Peking opera. He sang the theme song for the 1980 film Dadu River. He frequently held solo concerts and gave masterclasses across the world with his wife. An avid learner, he himself continued to travel to the United States for summer masterclasses offered by various opera companies and universities. He was the first Chinese singer to hold a concert in US, in 1986. He was invited to give a solo vocal concert in the domestic palace of Japan by the prince of Japan, and he sang the bass solo part of Beethoven's Ninth Symphony with the Osaka Symphony Orchestra.

He was invited by the political consultative conference of Hong Kong to perform a solo concert in 1989. Subsequently, he gave a performance of a vocal serials “Life”, staged in Macao the following year.

Wen died on 19 April 2007 at a hospital in Beijing. Although already battling cancer at that point, his death still came as a surprise as he continued to perform in between treatments and was in Beijing for a concert before being hospitalized. Wang stopped performing professionally after her husband's death but remained involved in community projects by organizing amateur choir performances. On International Museum Day in 2013, the family apartment in Jing'an District was designated a "family home museum", honoring the couple's legacy as much beloved public figures of the community cultural scene.

== Personal life ==
Wen was married to pianist Wang Qiu (王逑) from 1951 until his death. They have a daughter, Wen Lan. The couple first met in Nanjing where she had studied under famed pianist Li Jialu, who was also known as the teacher of another renowned concert pianist Gu Shengying. Wang would be the main accompanist for her husband in most of his concerts and performances.
