= Maria Lee Howe =

Singaporean musician (1915–2009)

Tay in 1966

Tay Lee Howe (Chinese: 李豪; 1915 – 3 May 2009), better known as Maria Lee Howe, was a Singaporean musical conductor, critic, educator and composer. Born in China, she came to Singapore after receiving musical education in Shanghai before the Japanese Occupation. After the end of the war, she left for London, where she furthered her musical education. Returning to Singapore in the 1950s, she founded the Lee Howe Choral Society, one of the first choirs in Singapore, and served as its conductor. At one point, she was one of only two female conductors on the island. She later taught music at several local schools. Tay was awarded the Bintang Bakti Masyarakat in 1978, the year of her official retirement from teaching. However, she continued to conduct for the choral society. Tay was also a writer, a supporter of the local scout's movement and a columnist for the Lianhe Zaobao.

== Early life and education ==
Tay was born in Wuhan, China in 1915. (Note: Her birthplace has also been given as Changsha and Hangzhou. However, Changsha was her ancestral home.) She began attending piano lessons at the age of five and later studied at the Shanghai Conservatory of Music. She also spent nine years as a Girl Guide, eventually become a guide leader. Her classmates at the conservatory included vocalist Zhou Xiaoyan and her teachers included composer Huang Tzu. After graduating from the conservatory, she began teaching music at the Hankou City No. 1 Girls’ High School. However, due to the outbreak of the Second Sino-Japanese War in 1937, she was evacuated along with the rest of the school. She travelled from Guilin to Hong Kong, intending to leave for Italy, where she was to further her musical education, by ship. However, while passing through Singapore, she was offered a position as a music teacher at the Pay Teck Girls' School in Malacca.

In 1941, Tay came to Singapore, where she was offered a position at the Nanyang Girls' High School as a music teacher. She then married and had several children. In 1948, three years after the end of the Japanese Occupation of Singapore, she left for London where she studied piano, singing and conducting. She attended the Guildhall School of Music and Drama and the Royal Academy of Music. While she was a student at the latter institution, conductor Sir John Barbirolli presented her with a baton which she kept as a "prized possession".

== Career ==
Tay returned to Singapore in 1952. In April, she gave a talk on "Vocal Music" at the British Council Hall on Stamford Road. In the same year, she established the Lee Howe Choral Society, which had 71 members at its inception. She served as the group's conductor. The society was among the first local choirs. The group's inaugural performance was held at the Victoria Memorial Hall on 11 November 1953, during which mostly Chinese works were performed with a few European exceptions, with a repeat performance in the following night. A critic with The Singapore Standard wrote that Tay was "to be congratulated on the training, discipline and overall vocal achievements of her choir." A June 1957 review in The Straits Times of a performance by the society praised her for the "high standard attained and the refreshingly well-balanced and sincere presentation."

Tay was a conductor with the Singapore Musical Society. On the resignation of Gordon Van Hien, she was one of three conductors for the society, the other two being Aisha Akbar and Benjamin Khoo. She also sat on the society's management committee. Tay was one of the only two female conductors in Singapore by September 1959. The Straits Times then described her as a "serene, smiling person, whose gentle voice belies the tremendous personality behind it" and that it was "this personality that performs with no difficulty, the very difficult job of commanding the respect and concentration of a mixed group of all ages." The reporter also noted that she had directed "several, very successful" concerts for the group and that her "charming personality" and her "authoritative musical knowledge" had "never failed to impress her audiences." When Barbirolli visited Singapore, he reportedly called her a "very gifted woman" and a "remarkably talented conductor." Tay later sued the management of the Nanyang Girls' High School for over $2000 for her "wrongful termination". The suit was settled in February 1960 after the defendants had agreed to donate that amount to Nanyang University.

In 1960, Tay stated that she believed that Singaporean musicians should perform classical music from different countries to allow Singaporeans to "have a better appreciation of music" and the "opportunity of selecting the best." She also staged a performance with the choral society to collect funds for the construction of the National Theatre. In the same year, she left for Germany, where she had been awarded a scholarship for a course in conducting at the University of Music and Theatre Munich. She then returned to England, where she studied under composer and conductor Sir Eugene Aynsley Goossens. After this, she left for the United States to further her musical education. The following year, she travelled to the United States and across Europe, where she "did intensive studies, met a lot of great conductors and listened to many concerts." She reportedly considered the year 1961 to be the "most significant" of her career. Tay also taught music at the Chung Cheng High School, the Chinese High School and the Yock Eng High School. She was conferred the Pingat Pentadbiran Awam in 1970.

Tay was also involved in the local scout's movement, believing it to be important in providing a "good and solid foundation" for youths. She first joined the Singapore Scout Association as an adviser, aiding in the organising of school parades and fundraisers, as well as in music. She was elected the vice-president of the association's Tanglin district in March 1972. In April 1974, she was made the district's first female president. In June, she participated in an Asia-Pacific Scout conference which was held in Singapore. She was re-appointed to the Film Appeal Board in the following month. Tay was among the ten people to be conferred the Bintang Bakti Masyarakat at the 1978 National Day Awards. She and social worker Mrs. Lee Chee San were the only women of the ten. She had retired from her position as a music teacher at the Chinese High School in January and was then also a divisional president with the St. John's Ambulance Brigade. By then, she had written and published two books and hoped to publish another two by next year.

Tay made several visits to China in the early 1980s. In an overall negative review of an April 1981 performance of Lee Yuk Chuan's Singapore River: Mother River of Singapore, Patricia Wei of the New Nation wrote that Tay was able to "inject some spirit into this work" and that she "rather stole the show". By April 1982, she was teaching conductorship and vocal music at a Yamaha Music School, composing songs and writing songs in her spare time. She was then also writing a book and learning to play the cello. In 1984 she was a lecturer at the Nanyang Academy of Fine Arts. From 1985 to 1991, she led the Lee Howe Choral Society on performances in cities across China, including Shanghai, Wuhan, Ürümqi, Guangzhou and Xi'an. She was a finalist for the Working Mother of the Year award for 1988. From 28 April 1991 to mid-1995, Tay contributed a column for the Lianhe Zaobao and also wrote on music for the newspaper. A collection of her writings in the column, titled Xiangye suixiang, was published in February 1996. She received the Lifetime Achievement Award from the Composers and Authors Society of Singapore in 1998, becoming the second person to have received the award, after composer Zubir Said. She was then described as the "first woman conductor in Singapore." In 2003, she announced that the Lee Howe Choral Society would be renamed the Song Lovers Choral Society.

Tay's students included vocalists Sng Chin Hock, Soo Ming Cheow, Elena Ng Choy Luan and Lui Chun Seng. She was also a writer, with her published works including Ouyou xiaoji, Wo dezhihui, Gei chuxue changge de pengyou and Luoyang suibi, as well as a book titled Jiaoxue 40 nian. Her written works also included over a hundred poems. Tay served as the chairman of the Singapore organising committee of the Malaysian Vocal Competition. She founded several school choirs in addition to the Lee Howe Choral Society, as well as the 11-Choral Society Combined Committee, which later became the Association of Choral Societies. She was also a social worker.

== Personal life and death ==
Tay married after coming to Singapore. She had already given birth to four children before she left for London. By 1959, she had become a mother of seven, including violinist Tay Boon Lay and harpist Tay Boon Yen. Besides singing, Tay could also play several instruments, including drums and the triangle. She held the belief that "language is in itself a form of music" and also enjoyed learning different languages. She also held the belief that the aim of music education is to "instil a sense of discipline in the students." She could speak Italian, French, German, Russian, Japanese, English and Mandarin, in addition to several Chinese dialects. Tay credited her mother with allowing her to enjoy and appreciate music. In the 1980s, she suffered a stroke which impacted her mobility. She was diagnosed with cancer in 1995. Although she recovered after surgery, her health continued to decline.

Tay died on 3 May 2009. There was neither a funeral nor a wake as she had wished for a quiet cremation. Her body was cremated at the Mandai Crematorium and Columbarium the following day, with newspaperman Ung Gim Sei, then-Minister for Home Affairs Ong Pang Boon and former politician Ch'ng Jit Koon present. A memorial service was held at the Singapore Conference Hall on 11 October, featuring vocal performances of her works by several local choirs. It was open to the general public. The event was attended by around 500 people, including Ong, Ch'ng and Ung, as well as former politician and Nanyang Academy of Fine Arts principal Ho Kah Leong, composer and conductor Leong Yoon Pin, then-Singapore Choral Association president Lee Yuk Chuan and businessman Poh Choon Ann. The Song Lovers Choral Society remains the oldest choir in Singapore. In October 2019, the choral society performed 10 of her compositions to commemorate the 10th anniversary of her death.
