= Oliver Sudden Productions =

- Founded: 1993
- Founder: Paul Etch
- Genre: Traditional, world
- Country of origin: Canada
- Location: Montreal, Quebec
- Official website: www.oliversudden.com

Oliver Sudden Productions is a Canadian independent record label focusing on traditional music from various parts of the world. The label was founded by music producer Paul Etch in Montreal, Canada in 1993. Highlights of the company's current catalog includes the albums by Chinese erhu player Lei Qiang, Japanese koto player Satomi Saeki, Vietnamese dan bau musician Pham Duc Thanh, Paraguayan harpist Eralio Gill, flamenco guitarist Juan Carranza, Indian sarod player Aditya Verma, Japanese shakuhachi player Alcvin Takegawa Ramos, Chinese yangqin musician and former music professor at the Shanghai Conservatory of Music Anna Guo, Chinese zheng player Hong Ting, and Chinese pipa player Liu Fang.

== Discography ==
- "Chinese Traditional Erhu Music vol. 1" by Lei Qiang 1995
- "Chinese Traditional Pipa Music" by Liu Fang 1996
- "Chinese Traditional Erhu Music vol. 2" by Lei Qiang 1997
- "Flamenco de la Costa" by Juan Carranza 1997
- "The Art of the Paraguayan Harp" by Eralio Gill 1998
- "Vietnamese Traditional Music " by Pham Duc Thanh 1998
- "Sarod; Traditional Music from India" by Aditya Verma 1998
- "Oliver Sudden Productions Sampler" by Various Artists 1999
- "Playa Gitana" by Juan Carranza 2000
- "Chinese Traditional Yang-qin Music" by Anna Guo 2001
- "Vietnamese Traditional Dan Bau Music" by Pham Duc Thanh 2002
- "Mareas" by Juan Carranza 2003
- "Chinese Traditional Zheng Music " by Hong Ting 2004
- "Japanese Traditional Koto and Shakuhachi" by Satomi Saeki & Alcvin Takegawa Ramos 2006
- "Japanese Traditional Flute for Meditation;Zen Shakuhachi Vol.1" Alcvin Takegawa Ramos 2007
- "Japanese Traditional Flute for Meditation;Zen Shakuhachi Vol.2" Alcvin Takegawa Ramos 2008
- "Japanese Koto Music" by Satomi Saeki 2009
- "Japanese Bamboo Flute -- Shakuhachi" by Alcvin Ryuzen Ramos 2011

== Filmography ==
Transformers 4 - The Age of Extinction 2014 Moonlight Reflected on the Er-Quan Spring by Lei Qiang from 1995 album Chinese Traditional Erhu Music Vol.1

== See also ==
- List of record labels
