= Dadu River (disambiguation) =

The Dadu River (大渡河) is a river in Sichuan.

Dadu River may also refer to:

- Dadu River (Taiwan) (大肚溪)
- Dadu River (film), based on the 1935 crossing of the Sichuan river by the Red Army
