= 2010 RTHK Top 10 Gold Songs Awards =

Hong Kong music awards ceremony

The 33rd RTHK Top 10 Gold Songs Awards (Chinese: 第三十三屆十大中文金曲頒獎音樂會) was held on January 7, 2011 for the 2010 music season.

== Top 10 song awards ==
The top 10 songs (十大中文金曲) of 2010 are as follows.

Song name in Chinese	Artist	Composer	Lyricist
陀飛輪	Eason Chan	Vincent Chow	Wyman Wong
愛的習慣	Justin Lo	Mark Lui	Albert Leung
破相	Joey Yung	Chan Fai-young	Wyman Wong
罪人	Hacken Lee	Abin Fang	Adrian Chow
天梯	C AllStar	Lai Ying Tong	鍾晴
時代	Leo Ku	Tse Kwok Wai, Victor	Albert Leung
雨過天陰	Kay Tse	Peco Chui	Adrian Chow
不要驚動愛情	Sammi Cheng	歐陽業俊	Zac Kao
以身試愛	Jade Kwan	Ronald Ng	Albert Leung
Get Over You	G.E.M.	Blair Daly; Bridget Benenate; Chris Farren	G.E.M

== Other awards ==
Award	Song or album (if available)	Recipient
Best prospect award (最有前途新人獎)	-	(gold) Sugar Club (silver) JW (bronze) C AllStar
Excellent Mandarin song award (優秀流行國語歌曲獎)	(gold) 說謊 (silver) 玩樂 (bronze) 脆弱	(gold) Yoga Lin (silver) Khalil Fong (bronze) Kay Tse
Outstanding singer award (優秀流行歌手大獎)	-	G.E.M., Joey Yung, Miriam Yeung, Janice Vidal, Kay Tse, Mr., Khalil Fong, Leo Ku, Hacken Lee, Hins Cheung, Jason Chan, Eason Chan
Outstanding female singer award (最優秀女歌手獎)	-	Joey Yung
Outstanding male singer award (最優秀男歌手獎)	-	Eason Chan
CASH best composer singer award (CASH最佳創作歌手獎)	-	Justin Lo
Most improved award (全年最佳進步獎)	-	(gold) RubberBand (silver) Ella Koon (bronze) Pakho Chau
Sales award for male artists (全年最高銷量歌手大獎)	-	Eason Chan
Sales award for female artist (全年最高銷量歌手大獎)	-	Sammi Cheng
Sales award for group (全年最高銷量歌手大獎)	-	Mr.
Best national male artist (全國最佳歌手獎)	-	Khalil Fong
Best national female artist (全國最佳歌手獎)	-	Li Yuchun
Best national group (全國最佳歌手獎)	-	Sodagreen
Best Chinese song award (全國最佳中文歌曲獎)	Deadline	Hins Cheung, Wyman Wong
International Chinese award (全球華人至尊金曲獎)	陀飛輪	Eason Chan, Vincent Chow, Wyman Wong
Mass Media Award (傳媒推薦大獎)	陀飛輪	Eason Chan, Sammi Cheng, Vincent Chow, Wyman Wong
RTHK Golden needle award (金針獎)	-	Sally Yip
