= Wenchen Qin =

Chinese composer

Wenchen Qin 秦文琛
- Born: 1966 (age 58–59); Erdos, Inner Mongolia, China
- Genres: Classical
- Occupation: Composer
- Years active: 1992–present

Wenchen Qin (Chinese: 秦文琛, b. October 29, 1966) is a Chinese composer.

== Life ==
Wenchen Qin (family name: Qin) was born in Erdos, Inner Mongolia, China, where he had classes in Chinese folk music at an early age. In 1987 he began his studies in composition at the Shanghai Conservatory of Music. He studied under Xu Shuya and Zhu Jian'er. After his graduation in 1992, he taught at the Central Conservatory of Music in Beijing. He went to Germany on a DAAD scholarship at the Folkwang Hochschule in Essen in 1998, where he graduated with distinction in 2001. His teacher was Nicolaus A. Huber. Since his return to Beijing in 2001 Qin is back as a teacher at the Central Conservatory of Music and he composes for many international patrons.

== Major works ==
=== Orchestra ===
- Yi Yun (1991/92)
- Yin Yi (2000/01)
- Pilgerfahrt im Mai (2004, "Pilgrimage in May")

for Deutschen Welle

- Wind-Moon Consonance (sheng, recorder & orchestra, 2004)

for "Chinese-Japanese Contemporary Music Festival 2004"

- "Morgengrauen", concerto for cello & orchestra (2008, "Dawn")

for Radio Shanghai and "Shanghai Spring International Music Festival"

=== Mixed ensembles ===
- Suona Konzert (for Chinese Orchestra, 1996)
- He-Yi (percussion, zheng, piano & strings, 1998)
- Huai Sha (percussion, harp, mandolin, piano & strings, 2000)

for WDR Köln

- The Sun Shadow III (harp, cello & percussion, 2000)
- The Spirit of the Mountains (soprano, violine, cello, piano & piano, 2003/04)

lyrics: Qu Yuan

- The Sun Shadow VI (chamber ensemble, 2005)
- The Sun Shadow VII (six strings, 2005)

for "Shanghai Spring International Music Festival"

- Five Songs on the Horizon (cello, accordion & strings, 2005)
- Pi Pa Words (Pipa, 2006)
