= Mei Gui Zhang =

Chinese opera singer

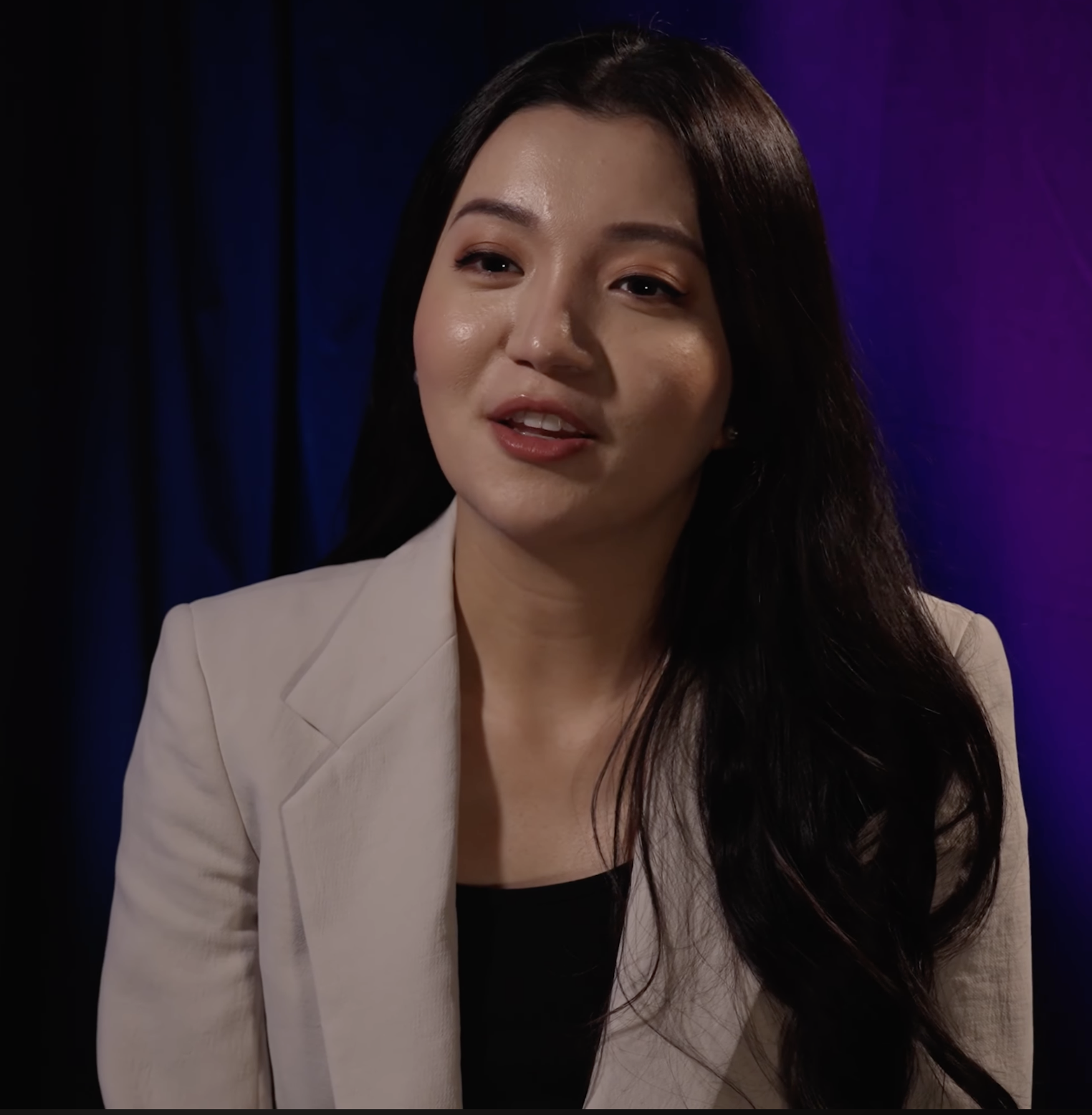
- Born: 1993 (age 32–33); Chengdu, Sichuan, China
- Occupation: Operatic soprano

Mei Gui Zhang (Chinese: 张玫瑰; pinyin: Zhāng Méiguī, born 1993) is a Chinese operatic soprano based in United States. She is a principal soprano at the Metropolitan Opera.

== Early life and education ==
Born into a musical family in Chengdu, Sichuan, Zhang studied to play the piano and violin from child age and studied vocal music under guidance of her parents. At three years old, she performed with Sichuan Symphony Orchestra, taking on the role of leading soloist.

In 2012, she was admitted to the Vocal Music Department of the Sichuan Conservatory of Music, ranking first in her major. The following year, she transferred to the Shanghai Conservatory of Music, under the tutelage of Zhou Xiaoyan.

From 2016 to 2018, Zhang received a scholarship and completed her master's degree from Mannes School of Music where she was a pupil of Diana Soviero. She performed roles in such operas as Despina in Cosi fan tutte, Gilda in Rogoletto. She was chosen to the Merola Opera Program of San Francisco Opera where she sang the Rake's Progress as Anne Trulove in 2018.

== Career ==
After graduation, she became the member of Metropolitan Opera's Lindemann Young Artist Development Program. She made her Metropolitan opera debut as Bloody Child in Macbeth and Barbarina in Le Nozze di Figaro. She appeared at the Metropolitan Opera Lindemann Young Artists concert series in Lincoln Center during 2018-2020, singing the scenes and arias from Bizet's Carmen, Donizetti's Don Pasquale, Massenet's Werther, and Strauss's Arabella among other works.

In 2019 She was a finalist in Queen Sonja International Music Competition, and took second place at the 2020 Opera Index Competition. In the next few years, she performed at major opera theaters across United States, especially in San Francisco.

In 2022, Zhang returned to the Met as Thibault in Verdi's Don Carlos of Sir David McVicar's new production, under the baton of Yannick Nézet-Séguin. She reprised as Barbarina in Mozart's Le Nozze di Figaro on the met stage.
