= Vladimir Shushlin =

Soviet vocalist

- Born: Vladimir Grigorievich Shushlin; 26 July 1896; Grodno, Russian Empire
- Died: 23 October 1978 (aged 82); Moscow, USSR
- Other names: Su Shi Lin
- Occupation: Opera singer
- Years active: 1909–1942

Vladimir Grigorievich Shushlin (Russian: Владимир Григорьевич Шушлин; 26 July 1896 – 23 October 1978) was a Russian opera singer. He is called "the founder of Chinese vocal singing" and was the first foreign singer in China to perform Chinese songs in the original language. Shushlin was known for his rich, bass singing voice and to his use of the traditional Italian opera style.

Shushlin was born in Grodno in 1896 and attended the St. Petersburg State Academic Capella in the early 1900s. Here he studied under Mikhail Klimov. Shushlin took up piano and violin before settling on operatic singing. He later joined the Mariinsky Theater, where he performed with Feodor Chaliapin and sang in the opera Boris Godunov. The two became good friends and continued to perform together, including in The Golden Cockerel. Shushlin graduated from the Saint Petersburg Conservatory in 1920. Between 1922 and 1924, he performed with the Saint Petersburg Philharmonic Orchestra. His last performance with them was of Götterdämmerung on 16 April 1924.

Fleeing Russia after the Russian Revolution, Shushlin moved to Harbin in 1924. Here he taught music and performed, going by the name Su Shi Lin. In 1927, he left to perform a tour of Japan and the Philippines. Shushlin returned to China in 1929 and moved to Shanghai. At the behest of Xiao Youmei, Shushlin joined the Shanghai Conservatory of Music in September 1930. Ding Shande considered Shushlin a teacher of 'first rank'.

Shushlin returned to Russia in 1956 and became a professor at the Moscow Conservatory. He died in Moscow in 1978.
