= Zhou Xiaoyan =

Chinese vocal pedagogue and classical soprano

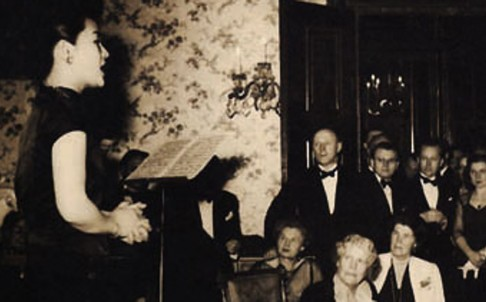
- Zhou Xiaoyan performing in 1947 in Shanghai
- Born: August 17, 1917; Wuhan, Hubei, China
- Died: March 4, 2016 (aged 98); Shanghai, China
- Education: Shanghai Conservatory of Music
- Alma mater: École Normale de Musique de Paris; Conservatoire russe de Paris Serge Rachmaninoff
- Occupations: Vocal pedagogue, Classical soprano
- Years active: 1937–2016
- Spouse: Zhang Junxiang (m. 1952; died 1996)

Chinese name
- Traditional Chinese: 周小燕
- Simplified Chinese: 周小燕
Transcriptions
Standard Mandarin
- Hanyu Pinyin: Zhōu Xiǎoyàn

Zhou Xiaoyan (Chinese: 周小燕; Wade–Giles: Chou Hsiao-yen; August 17, 1917 – March 4, 2016) was a Chinese vocal pedagogue and classical soprano. Dubbed by The New York Times as "China's First Lady of Opera", she was considered to be the first important instructor of Western opera in China.

As a vocalist, she performed in theaters and concert halls across Europe in 1946–1947; earning the nickname the "Chinese Nightingale". Under the directive of Premier Zhou Enlai, she began a career teaching voice at the Shanghai Conservatory of Music in 1949. She remained an instructor at the Shanghai Conservatory for more than 65 years. Many of her students went on to highly successful international opera careers.

== Early life in China ==
Born in Wuhan, Zhou's father, Zhou Cangbai (also known as Chou Tsang-po), was a wealthy banker. She was educated at a Roman Catholic school in Shanghai which exposed her to studies in Western music. She was also influenced in her youth by the White Russian and Jewish musicians who were prevalent in 1930s Shanghai.

In 1936, at the age of 18, Zhou began her professional musical training at the Shanghai Conservatory of Music. While a student at the conservatory she was a member in a performance art troupe. She rose to fame in her native country shortly after the outbreak of the Second Sino-Japanese War in 1937. Wishing to raise the morale of the Chinese people facing the invasion by Japan, she sang the patriotic song The Great Wall Ballad (长城谣) at concerts in Wuhan and Singapore which were highly regarded and inspired financial aid and the conscription of soldiers for the war effort.

== Studies in France and European career ==
In 1938 Zhou left China for studies in France after her voice teacher in Singapore told her that her voice was "too throaty". She pursued studies at the École Normale de Musique de Paris and later at the Conservatoire russe de Paris Serge Rachmaninoff. While at the latter institution her voice blossomed into a "bell-like lyric coloratura", and she befriended composer Nikolai Tcherepnin.

After eight years of studying, she embarked on a career as a concert soprano, beginning with a performance in Luxembourg in 1946. While she had considered pursuing work as an operatic soprano, she pursued the concert repertoire of composers like Claude Debussy and Gabriel Fauré instead given that, according to Zhou, "China had no opera at that time".

In 1946 Zhou was a featured soloist at the first Prague Spring International Music Festival; a performance which earned her the nickname the "Chinese nightingale". While at the festival she became acquainted with many luminary musicians of the 20th century, including Leonard Bernstein, David Oistrakh, Sviatoslav Richter, and Dmitri Shostakovich. Concerts in other major European cities followed from 1946 to 1947, including performances in London, Paris, and cities in the Czech Republic, Italy, Germany, and Switzerland.

== Performing and teaching career in China ==
At the bequest of her father, Zhou abandoned her European concert tour and returned home to Shanghai in 1947. In 1949 she became acquainted with Premier Zhou Enlai and writers Ba Jin and Ding Ling at a cultural conference on literature and art organized by the Chinese government. The three men encouraged her to pursue work performing for and teaching her craft to the people of China. She spent the next ten years performing wherever the Chinese government sent her; whether it be for everyday people at factories and shipyards, or on official tours overseas to the countries of India, Poland, North Korea, and the Soviet Union. She also joined the faculty of the Shanghai Conservatory in 1949. She married Chinese film director Zhang Junxiang on May 5, 1952.

=== Exile ===
With the rise of the Cultural Revolution, Western music was no longer accepted by those in power and Zhou found herself out of favor. She was accused of counter revolutionary activities in 1965. This led to her being exiled on a farm with her husband in the Chinese provinces for five years. Speaking of her experience with The New York Times, Zhou stated:

I was made to realize that I knew very little about my country. It was when I learned what it is to be Chinese—before I had been so cosmopolitan ... It was not so brutal. Zhou Enlai couldn't directly help me, but somehow I think he protected my family, who were mostly in Beijing. Red Guards never went near their house.

=== Return to Shanghai ===
In 1970 Zhou returned to Shanghai and her post at the conservatory. However, it was not until Deng Xiaoping came into office in 1978 that Zhou was able to achieve the freedom and support she needed to build a high quality opera program. Under Deng, Zhou's program slowly grew in size and strength. In 1988 she established the Zhou Xiaoyan Young Opera Singers Trainee Center on the fourth floor of the Shanghai Conservatory. With the financial backing of the Nanjing government she coordinated a fully staged production of Verdi's Rigoletto in the Chinese language in 1989 at the Shanghai Music Festival with her students as the cast. Several more Chinese language productions followed until a newly forged partnership between the San Francisco Opera and the Shanghai Conservatory enabled productions in other languages to be mounted by the school—beginning with a French language production of Gounod's Roméo et Juliette in 1996.

She and her program flourished with many of her students working successfully on the international stage. Among her pupils were opera singers Liao Changyong, Ying Fang, Ying Huang, Shenyang, Wei Song, Gu Xin, Guanqun Yu, and Jianyi Zhang.

== Death ==
On March 4, 2016, Zhou died at Ruijin Hospital in Shanghai, aged 98.
