= Gu Xin =

Chinese business executive and singer

- 顾欣
- Born: 1956 (age 69–70); Suzhou, Jiangsu, China
- Education: Nanjing Arts University; Shanghai Conservatory of Music
- Occupations: Singer, businessman
- Years active: 1982–2015
- Agent: China Oriental Performing Arts Group
- Political party: China Democratic League

Gu Xin (simplified Chinese: 顾欣; traditional Chinese: 顧欣; pinyin: Gù Xīn; born 1956) is a former Chinese business executive and singer. Gu was the board chairman and Executive Manager of the China Oriental Performing Arts Group, a state-owned arts group. On July 9, 2015, the Central Commission for Discipline Inspection (CCDI) issued a notice that it was investigating Gu for "serious violations of laws and regulations".

Gu is a member of the National Committee of Chinese People's Political Consultative Conference. He was also a member of the national standing committee of the China Democratic League. He is also the vice-president of Chinese Musicians Association. Gu is a doctoral supervisor at the Chinese Academy of Arts and Nanjing Arts University. He is a professor at Nanjing University and Southeast China University, he is also a visiting professor for schools in the Netherlands.

== Career ==
Hu was born in Suzhou, Jiangsu, in 1956. Gu entered Nanjing Arts University in 1973, he studied music under professor Li Zongpu (李宗璞). After graduation in 1977 he was assigned to Jiangsu Performing Arts Group as a vocal solo.

In January 2010, he served as the board chairman and Executive Manager of the China Oriental Performing Arts Group, and served until July 2015, while he was investigated by the Central Commission for Discipline Inspection of the Chinese Communist Party for "serious violations of discipline and law".

== Awards ==
Year	Award	Result	Notes
1989	"Zijin Drama Award"	Won	
1991	"Wenhua Award"	Won	
1992	"Plum Blossom Award"	Won	
1998	"Wenhua Performance Award"	Won	
2010	"Wenhua Director Award"	Won	
