= Lai Ying Tong =

Hong Kong musical artist

- Born: January 4 Hong Kong
- Occupation: Songwriter/Arranger/Performer/Music Education
- Years active: 2008 - Present

Chinese name
- Traditional Chinese: 賴映彤
- Simplified Chinese: 赖映彤
Transcriptions
Standard Mandarin
- Hanyu Pinyin: Lài Yìingtóng
Yue: Cantonese
- Jyutping: laai6 jing2 tung4
- Musical career
- Also known as: Siu Tung (小彤)
- Genres: Cantopop
- Instrument: Keyboard/Piano

Lai Ying Tong (Chinese: 賴映彤; born 4 January), known professionally as Siu Tung (Chinese: 小彤), is a Hong Kong Cantopop songwriter, arranger and performer as well as music educator. She graduated from the Chinese University of Hong Kong with a Master of Arts in music. Lai is currently a part-time music lecturer at Hong Kong Design Institute and Baron School of Music. Lai is also a columnist for Headline Music Magazine.

Lai works closely with the a cappella group C AllStar. She always plays keyboards in their concerts, so she has earned the name 'the 5th member of C AllStar'.

In 2012, Lai was awarded the fourth 'Joseph Koo New Generation Award' at the Annual CASH Awards Presentation. In 2010, her hit song 'Love Stairs' (天梯 Tianti) was one of the top ten gold songs at the 2010 RTHK Top 10 Gold Songs Awards as well as TVB Jade Solid Gold Best Ten Music Awards. In 2011, 'Lover Stairs' also won the Best Melody as well as the CASH Best Song award at the CASH Golden Sail Music Awards presentation. As of March 2015, the viewership of the official Music Video of 'Love Stairs' exceeded 10 million, which tops all the Cantopop Music Videos.

== Works ==
=== 2010 ===
- Make It Mellow – C AllStar (composer/arranger)
- iSing – C AllStar (composer)
- 80後時代曲 (80 hou shidai qu) – C AllStar (co-composer/arranger)
- 我們的電車上 (Women de dianche shang) – C AllStar (arranger)
- Make It Groovy – C AllStar (composer/arranger)
- 白色信件 (Let It Snow) – C AllStar (arranger)
- iSing (A cappella) – C AllStar (composer/arranger)
- 裙下之臣 (Qun xia zhi chen) – C AllStar (co-arranger)
- 0809 – C AllStar (arranger)
- To Be Continued... – C AllStar (composer/arranger)
- 我們結婚了 (Women jiehunie) – 葉文輝 (Barry Ip) feat. 范萱蔚 (Percy Fan) (arranger)
- 我們結婚了 (嫁嫁嫁... KaKaKa) (Women jiehunie (Jia Jia Jia...KaKaKa) – 葉文輝 (Barry Ip) feat. 范萱蔚 (Percy Fan) (arranger)

=== 2011 ===
- 全情關注 (Quan qing Guanzhu) – C AllStar (composer/arranger)
- 我們的胡士托 (Women de hu shi tuo) – C AllStar (composer/arranger)
- iSing (what I mean) – C AllStar (composer)
- We will live as one – C AllStar (composer/arranger)
- 韆鞦萬世 (Qianqiu wanshi) – C AllStar (arranger)
- 天梯 (Love Stairs/Tianti) – C AllStar (composer/co-arranger)
- 時間之光 (Shijian zhi quang) – C AllStar (arranger)
- 足球先生 (Zuqiu xiansheng) – C AllStar (composer/arranger)
- 小確幸 (Xiao que xing) – C AllStar (composer/arranger)
- 天梯 (Love Stairs/Tianti) string version – C AllStar (composer/co-arranger)
- 雨天沒有你 (Yutian meiyou ni) – C AllStar (arranger)
- 2013 的約定 (2013 de yueding ) – C AllStar (arranger)
- Love Life – C AllStar (arranger)
- We Are Kitchee! – C AllStar (arranger)
- 愛在當下 (香港電台【太陽計劃 2011】活動主題曲) ("Love The Moment" RTHK 2011 Solar Project theme song) – G.E.M., C AllStar (composer)

=== 2012 ===
- 從結束中開始 (Cong jieshu zhong kaishi) ) – C AllStar (co-composer/arranger)
- 切膚之痛 (Qie fu zhi tong) – C AllStar (composer/co-arranger)
- 少數 (Shao shu) – C AllStar (arranger)
- 直到你肯定 (Zhidao ni kending) – C AllStar (arranger)
- 一切從簡 (Yi qie cong jian) – C AllStar (arranger)
- 不知不覺已大個 (Bu zhi bu jue yi da ge) – C AllStar (arranger)
- 從當天到今天 (Cong dang tian dao jin tian) – C AllStar (arranger)
- 第一步 (Di yi bu) (Dr.Martens advertising song) – C AllStar (composer/arranger)
- Lost and Found – 陳蔚琦(Tiffany Chan) (arranger)

=== 2013 ===
- 混沌 (Hun dun) – C AllStar (co-arranger)
- 音樂殖民地 (Yin yue zhi min di) – C AllStar (composer/arranger)
- 老調兒 (Lao diao er) – C AllStar (composer/arranger)
- 她結他 (Ta jie ta) – C AllStar feat. SimC (arranger)
- 騷動 (Sao dong) – C AllStar (composer/arranger)
- 大同 (Da tong) – C AllStar (composer/arranger)
- 我們的胡士托 (紅館版) (Women de hu shi tuo (HK Coliseum version)) – C AllStar (composer/arranger)
- 六神合體 (Liu shen he ti) – C AllStar (composer/arranger)
- It's All Gone – 陳蔚琦(Tiffany Chan) (arranger)

=== 2014 ===
- 時日如飛 (Shi ri ru fei) – C AllStar (arranger)
- 星海 (Xing hai) – C AllStar (composer/arranger)
- 大同 (Da tong) Jazz Mix – C AllStar (composer/arranger)
- 城惶城恐 (Cheng huang cheng kong) – C AllStar (composer/arranger)
- 粉紅色的一生 (Fen hong se de yi sheng) - Pink dot Hong Kong theme song – C AllStar (arranger)

=== 2015 ===
- 戰場上的最後探戈 (Zhan chang shang de zui hou tan ge) – C AllStar feat. 顏卓靈 (Cherry Ngan)(composer/arranger)
- 煙花非花 (Yan hua fei hua) – C AllStar feat. 鍾鎮濤 (Kenny Bee) (co-arranger)
- 時間之光 (Shi jian zhi guang) – C AllStar feat. 鄭秀文 (Sammi Cheng) (arranger)
- SuperStar (SuperXmaStar Mix) – C AllStar feat. Super Girls (co-arranger)
- 上車咒 (Shang che zhou) – C AllStar (co-arranger)

== Concerts ==
Date	Concert Name	No. of Show(s)	Venue	Role
7/24/2011	C AllStar x HKAO 「Post 80s' Symphony Generation Concert」	1	Sha Tin Town Hall	Keyboardist
11/9/2011	903id club Live C AllStar x Eman Lam Concert	1	Rotunda 3, KITEC	Keyboardist
12/27/2011	Neway Music Live X C AllStar Concert	1	Rotunda 3, KITEC	Keyboardist
11/23-24/2012	C AllStar C AllLive Concert 2012	2	Star Hall, KITEC	Keyboardist
5/22/2013	Fruitips presents C AllStar Juicy Concert	1	Jockey Club Auditorium, Poly U	Music Director, Keyboardist
3/23/2014	C AllStar 'Women de hu shi tuo' Concert 2014	1	Hong Kong Coliseum	Keyboardist
8/2/2014	C AllStar 'Women de hu shi tuo Concert 2014' – Macau Stop	1	Venetian Theatre, The Venetian Macao	Keyboardist

== Musicals ==
Date	Musical's Name	No. of Show(s)	Venue	Role
6-9/10/2011	C AllStar X Kengo Ip (健吾) 《摘星天梯》(Zhai Xing Tianti)	4	Sheung Wan Civic Centre, Theatre	Music Director, Keyboardist
25-28/4/2013	《音樂情書》Heartbeat Delivered	6	Sheung Wan Civic Centre, Theatre	Music Director, Keyboardist

== Solo Performance ==
Date	Concert Name	No. of Show(s)	Venue	Role	Note
12/13/2012	Swire Properties presents Music@Via Fiori	1	One Island East	Performer (Singer)	featuring C AllStar
