= Anna Guo =

Anna Guo (Chinese: 郭敏清; pinyin: Guō Mǐnqīng) is a Chinese-born Canadian traditional musician who plays the yangqin.

== Career ==
She taught at the Shanghai Conservatory of Music. From 1985 to 1996, she was head of the Shanghai Women's Silk String Quintet. In 1996 she emigrated to Toronto, Ontario, Canada. In 2007, to celebrate the 10th anniversary of the return of Hong Kong, the Hong Kong Chinese Orchestra performed with Guo on yangqin, Wong Onyuen on gaohu, and George Gao on erhu.

== Discography ==
- 1992 - Collection of Yang-qin Solos
- 1995 - Masterpieces Performed by Yang-qin Masters
- 2001 - Chinese Traditional Yang-qin Music Oliver Sudden Productions
