= Zhu Jian'er =

Chinese composer (1922–2017)

Zhu Jian'er (Chinese: 朱践耳; pinyin: Zhū Jiàn'ěr; born Zhu Rong-shi, October 18, 1922 – August 15, 2017), courtesy name Zhu Pu-chen, was a Chinese symphonic composer and songwriter.

== Biography ==
Zhu was born in Tianjin, China. In his early years, his grandfather moved his family to Shanghai. His family consisted of flour millers, and his father died when Zhu was three.

Out of admiration for Nie Er, Zhu Rong-shi changed his name to Zhu Jian'er.

He began composing in 1940 and pursued composition studies at the Moscow Conservatory in 1955. He was a professor at the Shanghai Conservatory. He composed for both Western and Chinese instruments and his works have been performed around the world. In 2000 he was commissioned by Yo-Yo Ma's Silk Road Project to compose Silk Road Reverie.

His 1950 revolutionary work Days of Emancipation (翻身的日子, Fānshēn de Rìzi; for banhu and Chinese orchestra) is well known in the West from its appearance on the 1981 CBS Masterworks compilation Phases of the Moon: Traditional Chinese Music.

Zhu died on August 15, 2017, in Shanghai.

== List of major works ==
Orchestral:

- Jieri Xuqu 节日序曲 (Festival Overture), Op.10 (1958)
- Symphony-Cantata: Yingxiong de Shipian 英雄的诗篇 (Poems of heroes), Op.14 (Original:1959 - 1960; First Edit:1964; Second Edit:1993)
- Ballet Music: Nanhai Changcheng 南海长城 (Great Wall beside the South China Sea) (1965)
- Huainian 怀念 (In Memoriam), for Strings, Op.18 (1978 - 1988)
- Jiaoxiang huanxiang qu 交响幻想曲: Jinian wei zhenli xianshen de yongshi 纪念为真理献身的勇士 (Symphonic Fantasia:a Commemoration to the Brave sacrificed for verity), Op.21 (1980)
- Jiaoxiang zuqu 交响组曲: Qianling Sumiao 黔岭素描 (Symphonic Suite: Sketches of Mount Qian), Op.23 (1982)
- Hudie qun zuqu 蝴蝶泉组曲: erhu yu guanxian yuedui二 胡与管弦乐队 (Suite "Butterfly Spring" for erhu and Orchestra:), Op.24 (1983)
- Jiaoxiang yinshi 交响音诗: Naxi Yiqi 纳西一奇 (Symphonic Poem: Wonders of Naxi), Op.25 (1984)
- Jiaoxiang shi 交响诗: Bainian Cangsang 百年沧桑 (Symphonic Poem: Vicissitude of a century)
- Nanhai Yuge 南海渔歌 (Fishermen's Ballade), Suite No. 1 Op. 16 (1965/2003)

Symphonies:

- Symphony No.1
- Symphony No.2
- Symphony No.3,"Tibet"
- Symphony No.4,"6.4.2-1", for Dizi and Orchestra
- Symphony No.5, for Chinese drum and Orchestra
- Symphony No.6,"3Y", for Tapes and Orchestra
- Symphony No.7,"Tianlai, Dilai, Renlai" 天籟、地籟、人籟 (Sounds of paradise, earth and mankind)
- Symphony No.8,"Qiu Suo 求索" (Seek and Quest), for 16 percussions and a Cello
- Symphony No.9, for Boy Choir and Orchestra
- Symphony No.10,"Jiangxue 江雪 (Snow on river), for Orchestra, with Guqin (Tape) and Chanting (Tape)

== Students ==
- Wenchen Qin
