= Guanqun Yu =

Chinese soprano (born 1982)

Guanqun Yu (Chinese: 于冠群; pinyin: Yú Guānqún; born 1982) is a Chinese soprano who has sung in opera houses and concert halls internationally. In 2008 she won the Belvedere International Singing Competition and in 2012 she placed 2nd in the Operalia, The World Opera Competition. She is particularly known for portraying heroines in the operas of Wolfgang Amadeus Mozart, Giacomo Puccini, and Giuseppe Verdi.

== Life and career ==
Born and raised in Yantai, Shandong, Yu graduated from the Shandong University of Arts before going on to study at the Shanghai Conservatory of Music with Fugen Wei and Zhou Xiaoyan. She then became a member of the Young Artist Program at the Teatro Comunale di Bologna where she made her professional opera debut as Elettra in Idomeneo; a role she has subsequently performed at the Teatro Comunale Ferrara, the Teatro Comunale Modena, and the Teatro Municipale in Reggio Emilia. In 2010 she performed the role of Margarete in Arthur Honegger's Jeanne d'Arc au bûcher at the Musikverein in Vienna under the baton of Bertrand de Billy. In 2011 she portrayed Leonora in Verdi's Il trovatore at the Teatro Giuseppe Verdi.

In 2012 Yu made her debut at the Metropolitan Opera as Leonora, and subsequently returned to the Met in 2013-2014 as Fiordiligi in Così fan tutte. She also appeared as Lina in Stiffelio and the Voice of the High Priestess in Aida at the Teatro Regio di Parma in 2012. In 2013 she made her debut at the Palau de les Arts Reina Sofia, Valencia as Lucrezia in I due Foscari with Plácido Domingo as Francesco Foscari, and later appeared at that theater as Desdomona in Otello (2013) and Amelia in Simon Boccanegra, again with Plácido Domingo (2014).

In 2014 Yu portrayed Fiordiligi at the Cologne Opera, Nedda in Pagliacci at the Stadttheater Klagenfurt, and Countess Almaviva in The Marriage of Figaro at the National Centre for the Performing Arts in Beijing. In 2015 she portrayed Liu in Turandot at the Bregenz Festival, Mimi in La bohème at the Zurich Opera and the Deutsche Oper Berlin, and both Countess Rosina in John Corigliano's The Ghosts of Versailles and Countess Almaviva in The Marriage of Figaro at the Los Angeles Opera. In 2016 she is appeared at the Opéra de Marseille as Fiordiligi, and at the Bavarian State Opera as Countess Almaviva.
