= Ba Ban Chinese Music Society of New York =

Traditional Chinese performance group (1999–)

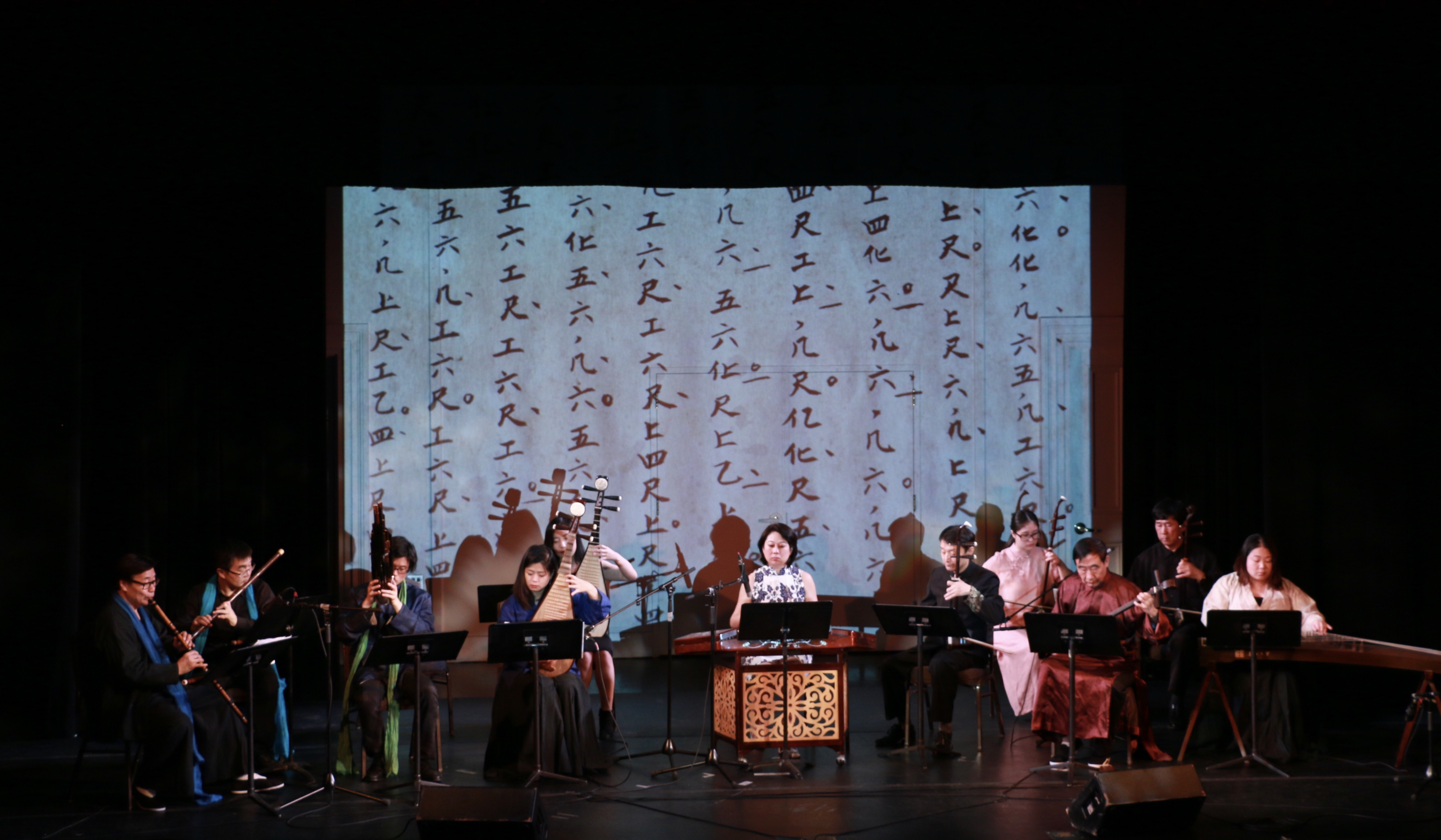
- Ba Ban Chinese Music Society plays the classical "Sound of Silk and Bamboo" music from the Yangtze River
- Named after: An ancient piece of folk music
- Formation: 1999; 27 years ago
- Type: Music Society
- Purpose: Preservation, creation and presentation of Chinese traditional and contemporary performing arts
- Headquarters: Queens, New York

The Ba Ban Chinese Music Society of New York is a Chinese music group. It conserves, generates, and performs Chinese traditional and modern performing arts. Named after an ancient piece of folk music, "Ba Ban" literally means "Eight Beats" which is the structural basis for the grouping of notes in traditional Chinese music. Founded in 1999, it is based in Queens, New York. The musician Zhou Yi co-founded the group.

The ensemble includes highly accomplished artists who graduated from the top conservatories in China and have performed in concert halls around the world. The ensemble performs on "silk and bamboo" (sizhu) instruments: a classical instrumental grouping dating from the Qing dynasty (1644-1912) that includes various dizi (bamboo flutes), sheng (mouth organ), pipa (lute), qin (seven-stringed zither), ruan (alto lute), huqin (fiddles) and yangqin (dulcimer). In 2015, the group was recognized by the New York City Council for exemplary cultural service to the community. Some highlighted performances by the Ba Ban Chinese Music Society are:

1. The Landmark Event - New York State's first official celebration of the “Lunar New Year 4698”
2. “Asia Night” - the first appearance by a traditional Chinese music group at both Shea Stadium and Citi Field
3. Spoleto Festival's Premiere Show “Monkey: Journey To The West” - collaborated with Damon Albarn (Gorillaz/Blur)
4. “Cultural Days” - performed in front of the Chinese Ambassador to the United Nations and other dignitaries at the Chinese Consulate
5. Recorded the Music for Off-Broadway Productions - David Henry Hwang's “The Dance and the Railroad” and “Around the World in 80 Days”
6. “Met Gala 2015” - shared the stage with Rihanna
7. The Empire State Building lighting ceremony for the Lunar New Year
8. “Along the Yangtze River” and “Shanghai Memories: Golden Age of the 1930s & 40s Music” - Two sold out productions presented by the Queens Council on the Arts and the Flushing Town Hall
9. “Red” - The Lunar New Year special production presented by the Brooklyn Central Library and Queens Central Library
10. Carnegie Hall's “Musical Explorer” Program
