= Youxin Yang =

Chinese painter, film director, scientist, screenwriter and songwriter

Youxin Yang (Chinese: 杨有新) is a scientist, screenwriter, director, songwriter, and painter.

== Career ==
=== Science ===
Yang was born in Xuzhou, China. After finishing her medical education in Nanjing, she received her PhD from Pierre and Marie Curie University. She was awarded a prize from the Association for the Study of Pediatric Pathology for her work on the WT1 gene in Denys–Drash syndrome and diffuse mesangial sclerosis.

=== Screenwriter and director ===
Feuille, Yang's first feature film, won the Remi Platinum Award at the 37th WorldFest Houston International Film Festival, Accolade Award (Award of Excellence), and Best Drama at the 2004 New York International Independent Film and Video Festival.

The original version of Feuille was shot in Paris in 1998. Because of some of the themes present in the film, such as homosexuality, it was not shown at the time in China. It aired on a Shanghai TV channel as a 15-minute short film titled Listening to the Rain.

This film was praised by the World Journal for its description of pure love and the kindness in human nature.

=== Songwriting ===
Leaf, with new images and a new theme song—"True Love Has Only One End—written and composed by Yang, won a Remi Gold Award at the 40th WorldFest Houston on April 28, 2007.

Yang won the Award of Excellence in 2005 Accolade Competition for writing the song "Silent Fire" for her second feature film Silent Fire, which also won Best Score at the 2005 New York International Independent Film Festival.

==== Peace-Melody under Brushes ====
Yang is the painter and songwriter of her music video series Peace-Melody under Brushes. The images that accompany the music showcase her Peace series of paintings.

==== Baby get rid of that dark obsession please! ====
The music video and her Peace series of paintings were shown at the Arts Club of Washington DC in September, and the Watertown Free Public Library in October 2014.

Sandra Gobar, curator for the Arts Club of Washington, said, “Her palette, once on the canvas, is reminiscent of more than a Zen-like experience. She beautifully mesmerizes you with her painfully poetic conversation she engages you in, and invites you into the conversation as well when you look at herwork.”

Her Peace painting was included in an exhibit titled ‘Pursuing Justice Through Art’, which was presented by the Whistler House Museum of Art in 2015.

“Baby get rid of that dark obsession please!” won an Award of Merit at Accolade Global Film Competition, and an Award of Merit at the Best Shorts film competition in 2014.

==== God means loving, not killing! ====
The music video won three Remi Awards in World Peace & Understanding, Historical, and Film & Video Art categories at the 48th Annual WorldFest Houston International Independent Film Festival.

“God means loving, not killing!” was a New Age category winner of the 2016 American Songwriting Awards.

==== Mr. Or Ms. President, We Can Feel Safe Only If The Innocent In Other Landscapes Feel The Same. ====
The film “Mr. Or Ms. President, We Can Feel Safe Only If The Innocent In Other Landscapes Feel The Same” was hosted at the 2016 ArtPrize venue Blue Bridge. Yang was honored with title of Queen of Distinction at the Woman of Achievement Pageant.

=== Painting ===
Yang was a Grand Jury Award winner at the 2005 New York International Art Festival.

Her painting Dialogue between History and Modern I was a winner at the 2008 WCA national Featured Member Artist Competition.

Her works Dialogue between History and Modern II and Peace III won the first place award and honorable mention, respectively, at the People, Faces, and Figures leading artists gallery art exhibition in 2013.

Yang's paintings have been featured internationally in solo exhibitions at the Espace Richelieu in Paris, France, L'Essence Art Gallery in Boston, the Cultural Exchange Center in east Boston, USA, and the Dr. Sun Yat-Sen Classical Chinese Garden in British Columbia, Canada.

Articles written by two French art historians and several Chinese journalists, along with her recent paintings, were collected into a book titled Youxin Yang, M.D., Ph.D.: An Artist and Scientist. These collected biographical Chinese articles were from The European Times, Europe Journal, Modern Family, The Chinese Journal of Youth, and World Journal.

==== Peace Art Exhibition ====
Peace I won second place in water media at the Highlands Museum and Discovery Center's National Juried Art Show 2013.

Her painting Peace III was chosen for inclusion in the 26th Annual September Competition presented by the Alexandria Museum of Art.

Peace II, 2012, Peace IV, 2013, Peace I, 2012, and Peace VI-Boston Marathon 2013 won 2013 the American Art Award in the pastel category.
