= Shenyang (singer) =

Chinese bass-baritone singer (born 1984)

Shenyang (Chinese: 沈洋; pinyin: Shěn Yáng; born March 20, 1984) is a Chinese bass-baritone singer. His repertoire encompasses operatic roles, chamber music and Lieder recitals.

Shenyang was born in Tianjin, the son of professional musicians, but did not start singing until the age of sixteen, after his voice broke. He took inspiration from recordings of the German Lieder singer Hans Hotter. At age nineteen, he entered the Shanghai Conservatory of Music, where he studied with Zhou Xiaoyan at the Zhou Xiaoyan International Opera Center.

At the Conservatory, in early 2007 he attended a masterclass given by soprano Renée Fleming. She arranged vocal coaching for him that spring at the Metropolitan Opera in New York, and he went on to win the 2007 BBC Cardiff Singer of the World competition. After the win, noting confusion in the Western press over the name "Shen Yang", he decided to change its spelling to "Shenyang".

Subsequently, he entered the Metropolitan Opera's Lindemann Young Artist Development Program and the artist diploma program at the Juilliard School. He gave the Juilliard's 2009 Alice Tully Vocal Arts Debut Recital, in which he sang a program in tribute to Hans Hotter, marking Hotter's centenary. His debut at the Metropolitan Opera came in April 2009, as Masetto in Don Giovanni. He sang the role of Colline in La Bohème at the Met in February 2010.

Other awards he has won include a Borletti-Buitoni Trust Award in 2008, and Montblanc New Voices at Saint Petersburg's White Nights Festival in 2010.

In May 2011 he made a return visit to Shanghai to give a recital of Chinese art song at the Shanghai Grand Theatre, at which he declared his intention to promote that repertoire.
