= Hou Muren =

Chinese musician

Hou Muren (侯牧人; born 1952 in Shanghai) is a Chinese rock musician.

Hou Muren is best known for album of rock covers of socialist standards, Red Rock (红色摇滚 Hongse yaogun) released in 1992. At the time Hou Muren and his band Xiandairen were an unchallenging alternative to the discontent shown by protest artists such as He Yong.
