= Dadu River (film) =

1980 Chinese war film

Da du he
- Directed by: Nong Lin
- Starring: Xuecheng Fu; Shi Han
- Release date: 1980
- Running time: 99 minutes
- Country: China
- Language: Mandarin

Dadu he (Chinese: 大渡河) is a 1980 Chinese war film directed by Nong Lin. The film tells the story of the 1935 crossing of the Dadu River by the Red Army.

== Cast and crew ==
- Xuecheng Fu as Liu Bocheng
- Shi Han as Mao Zedong
- Huaizheng Liu as Zhu De
- Hengduo Zhao as Chiang Kaishek
- Shenqiu Zhao as Zhou Enlai

The theme song was sung by Wen Kezheng.
