= William Tete Luo =

Chinese pianist

- Born: March 9, 2007 (age 18); China
- Instrument: Piano
- Years active: 2011–present

William Tete Luo (Chinese: 罗小特; pinyin: Luó Xiǎotè, born March 9, 2007) is a piano prodigy. Born in China, he started his piano studies when he was four and a half years old. Soon, after two months' practise, he was invited to perform Christmas songs on Christmas Eve in a church in Beijing. At six years old, he received his first award, the First Prize from the Primary and Middle School Students Art Festival in Haidian District, Beijing, when he became a student there. At seven years old, he won the Second Prize of the Hope Cup Piano Competition. In 2015, he was the champion of "Tiancai Baobei", a competition held by Beijing Television for talented children. Afterwards he was invited to perform "Flight of the Bumble Bee" with a well known musician, Guo Feng, for the Chinese New Year's Gala, 2016. Soon after, BTV televised an exclusive interview with him.
