= Di Xiao =

Classical Pianist

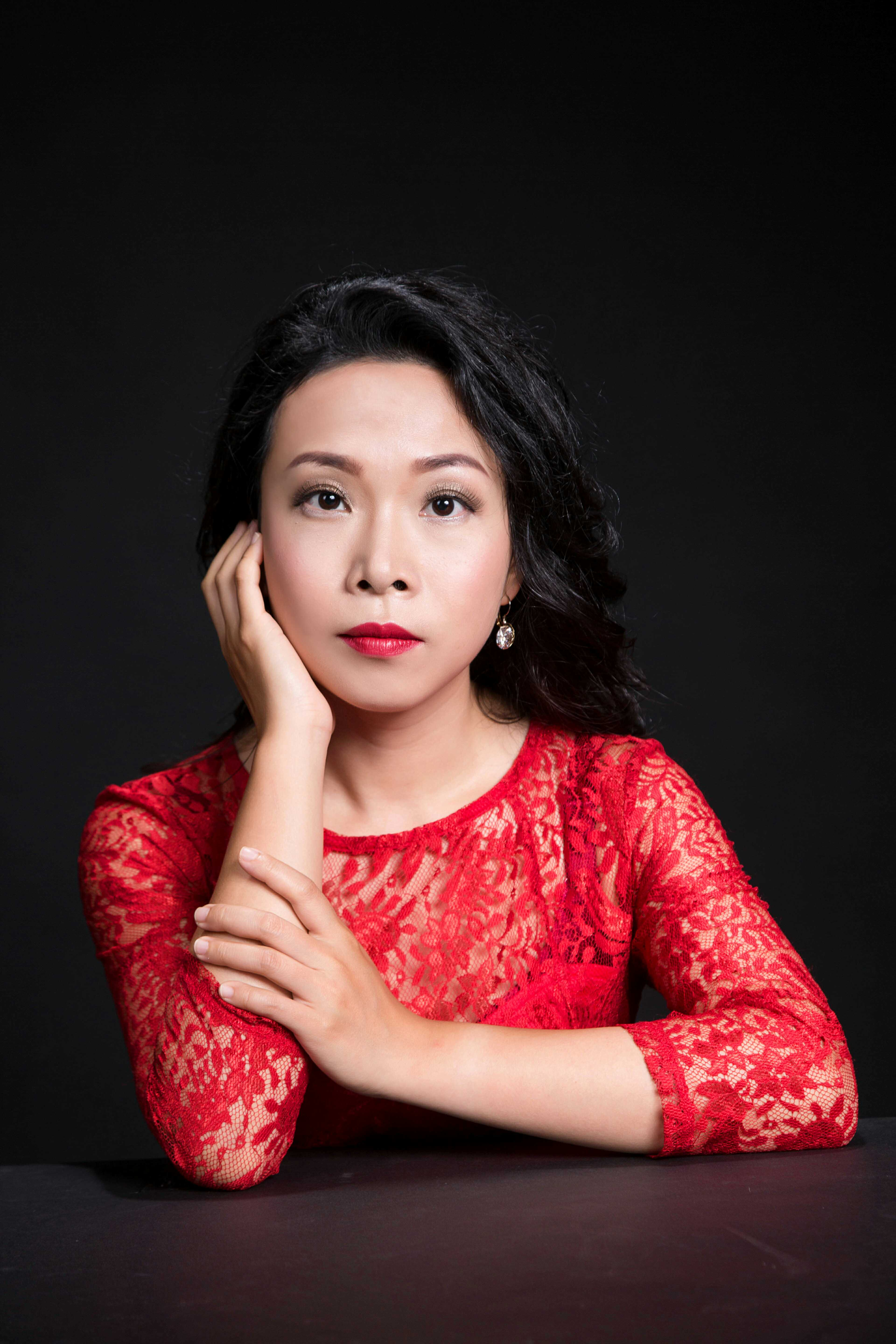
- Classical Pianist Di Xiao

Background information
- Genres: classical
- Occupation: pianist
- Instrument: piano
- Years active: 1996 - present day
- Website: www.dixiao.co.uk

Di Xiao (Chinese: 肖荻; pinyin: Xiāo Dí) is a classical piano soloist originally from China, named in the top 10 up and coming Chinese pianists by International Piano Magazine in 2009. Di Xiao is currently based in the UK.

== Introduction ==
Described as "a pianist of awesome gifts" by the Birmingham Post, the Chinese pianist Di Xiao recently concluded a major international recital tour representing the U.K as part of the universally acclaimed European Concert Hall Organisation (ECHO) 'Rising Stars' series. The tour included sell out concerts at the Concertgebouw Amsterdam, (Konzerthaus, Vienna), Salzburg Mozarteum concert hall, Stockholm Concert Hall(Konserthaus), Luxembourg Philharmonie and many more. Following her Köln Philharmoie recital their press stated that "Di Xiao presents a demanding programme that takes your breath away". Di Xiao continues to thrill audiences across the world performing regularly outside the UK in Europe and Asia. Di Xiao’s stated aim is "to become an international ambassador for the piano, combining both Chinese and Western repertoire in the programming of my concerts, thereby creating a bridge between two cultures".

== Education ==
Di Xiao’s education included study at the Odesa Conservatoire, under the eminent Professors A. M. Bougaevski and G. V. Popova and the Central Conservatory of Music Beijing. She graduated from the latter with one of the highest marks in the history of the Conservatory. In 2005 she was awarded a full scholarship by Birmingham Conservatoire where she studied under Mark Racz, now Deputy Principal at The Royal Academy of Music London, and Professor Malcolm Wilson. Respected by the musical elite, Di Xiao has enjoyed private master classes with Alfred Brendel, John Lill, Peter Donohoe and Simon Trpčeski.

== Prizes and awards ==
Di Xiao enjoyed success in competition from and early age winning the Most Outstanding Young Musician of Guangdong Province Award aged just 16. Since then she has won many national and international prizes including; the Ludlow Philharmonic Concerto Prize in 2005, the Birmingham Symphony Hall Prize in 2006, a Worshipful Company of Musicians Silver Medal in 2007 and, in the same year, first prize in the Brant International Piano Competition. In 2009 she was acknowledged among the top 10 most promising young Chinese pianists by International Piano Magazine

== International career ==
Xiao’s international career started at 17 when she played Yin Chengzong's Yellow River Piano Concerto in Kuala Lumpur and Penang for the Malaysian Royal Family. She has subsequently been invited to perform as a soloist in many countries including Malaysia, Ukraine, Singapore, India, China and the UK. In the UK, her concert performances have received much acclaim. Her debut at Symphony Hall, Birmingham in 2006 was described by the UK Chinese Times as "A stunning concert!" and an early performance of the Schumann Concerto (Piano Concerto (Schumann)) prompted The Birmingham Post to say "In her graceful, dancing finale it was easy to imagine Clara Schumann at the keyboard". She has appeared in a number of important music festivals including Berman Musikfest (Germany), ISA music Festival (Austria), New Generation Arts Festival (UK), Buxton Arts Festivals (UK) and Leamington Music Festival (UK). In October 2010, she played for her home town’s inaugural International Classical Music Festival in Guangzhou, China.

== Recording and broadcast ==
In 2008, Di Xiao released her debut album Di Xiao Presents and her second, Journey was released in October 2011. The albums were well received and featured on flagship radio programmes including the BBC Radio 3 programme In Tune. and BBC Radio 4's Woman’s Hour. Also in August 2011, Di Xiao began recording the piano works of Ravel for SOMM Recordings, the first CD will be released in 2012. The artist has been interviewed by a number of leading magazines and radio stations including Classic FM and BBC Radio 3. In February 2011, Di Xiao featured on BBC Radio 3's In Tune programme as a prelude to her St Martin-in-the-Fields debut when, during a 30-minute slot, Di Xiao was interviewed by host Sean Rafferty and played live on air. Additionally, many of Di’s live performances were recorded and transmitted on radio stations across Europe.

== Repertoire ==
Xiao’s repertoire reflects a broad spectrum of interests with a wide range of musical styles. Her range extends from the works of Mozart and Ludwig van Beethoven to Maurice Ravel, Sergei Prokofiev and Olivier Messiaen. She has a keen interest in Chinese classical folk music and contemporary piano works. Involved in a number of collaborations, she works with artists including Julian Lloyd Webber and EMI guitarist Xuefei Yang.
