= Sheung Wan Civic Centre =

Performance venue in Sheung Wan, Hong Kong

Coordinates: 22.2862°N 114.1497°E

- 上環文娛中心
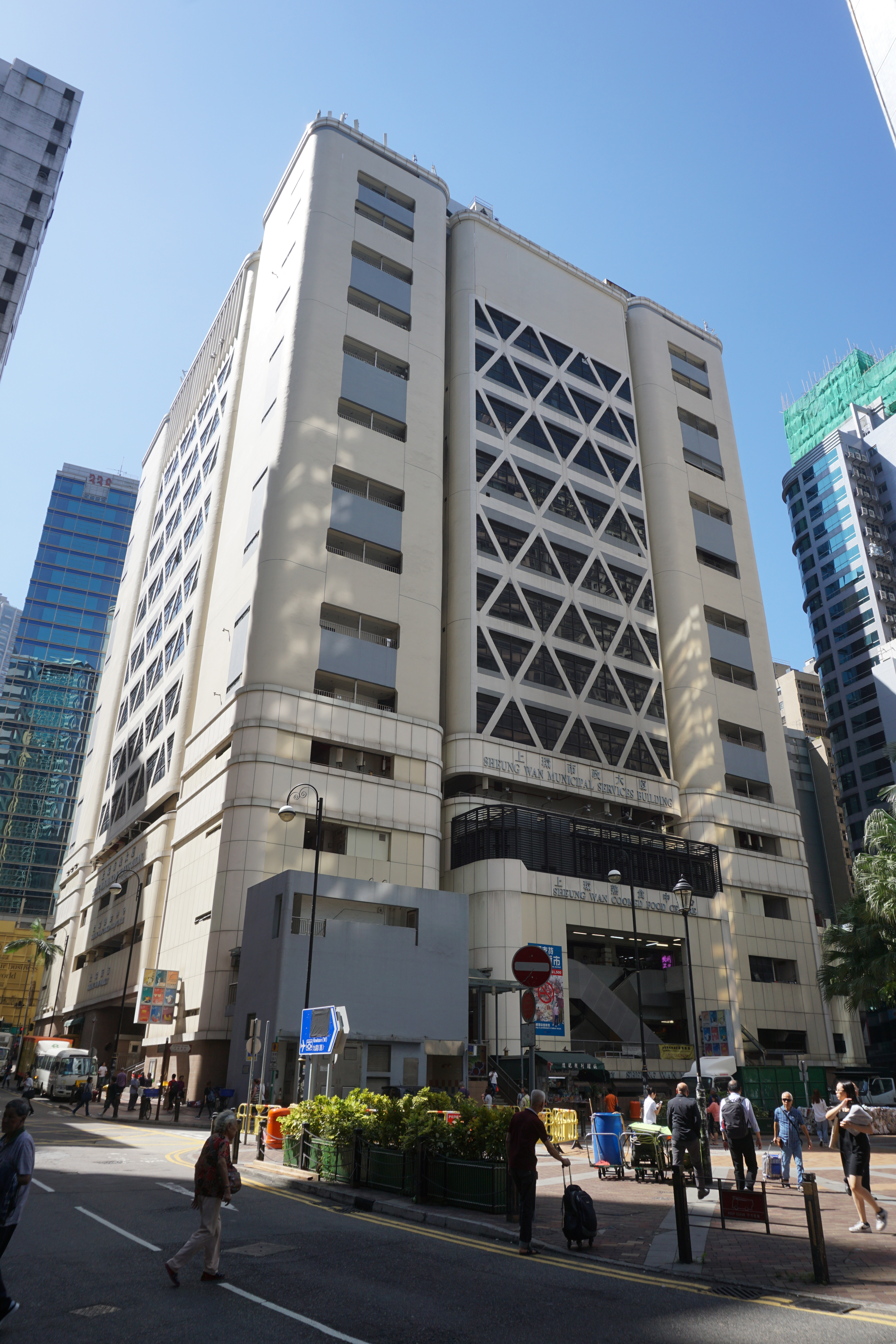
- Sheung Wan Civic Centre.
- Interactive map of the Sheung Wan Civic Centre area

General information
- Type: Performing arts centre
- Location: 345 Queen's Road Central, Sheung Wan Municipal Services Building, China
- Owner: Hong Kong Government
- Landlord: Leisure and Cultural Services Department

Website
- Official website

Sheung Wan Civic Centre
- Traditional Chinese: 上環文娛中心
Transcriptions
Yue: Cantonese
- Yale Romanization: Seuhng wàahn màhn yùh jūng sām
- Jyutping: Soeng6 waan4 man4 jyu4 zung1 sam1

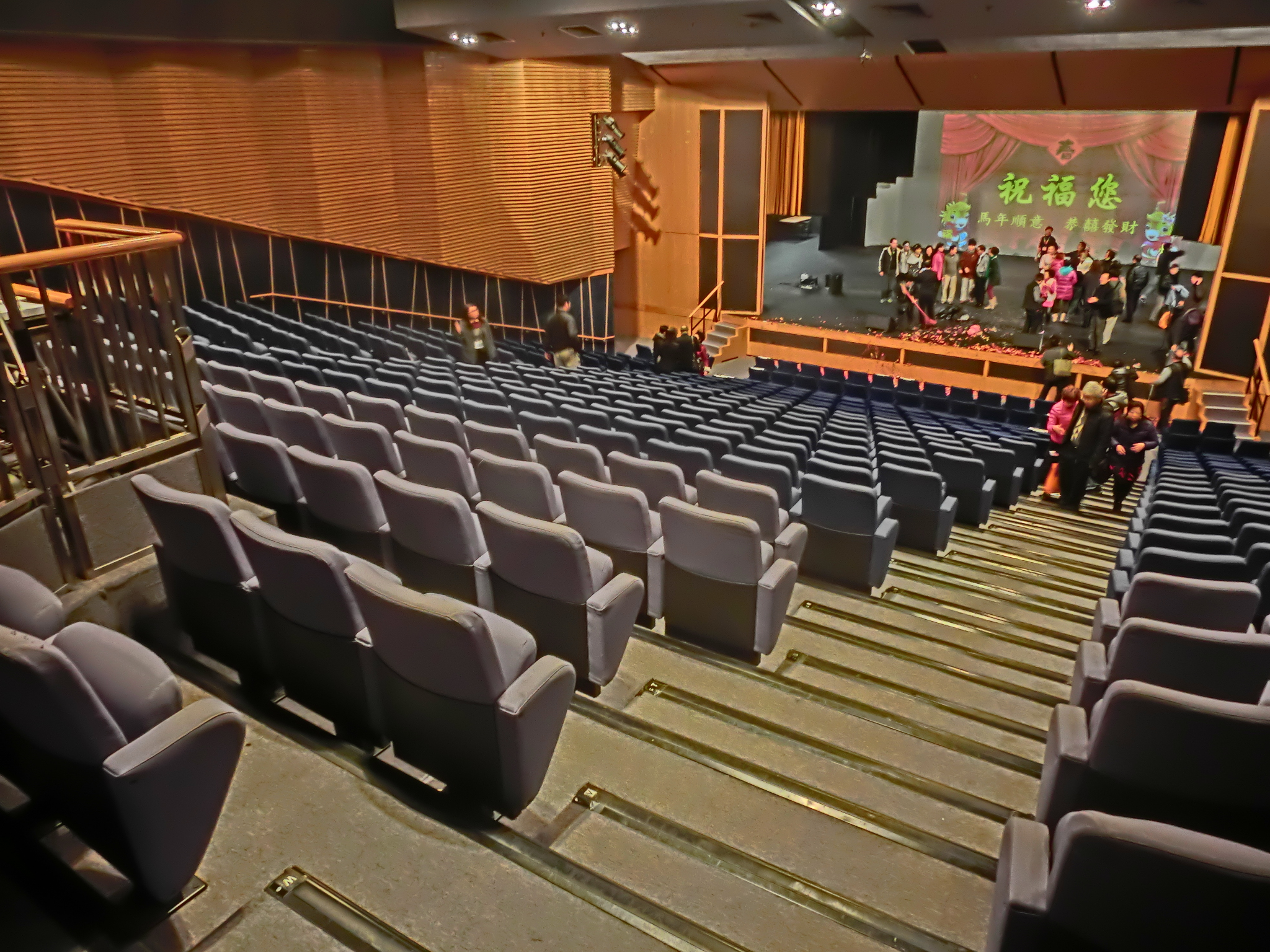
Theatre

Sheung Wan Civic Centre is a performing arts centre located in the Sheung Wan Municipal Services Building, on Queen's Road Central, Sheung Wan, Hong Kong. It is a popular theatre venue in Hong Kong.

Sheung Wan Civic Centre is one of the subsidiary community arts centres under the Leisure and Cultural Services Department, offers 9 hiring units: Theatre, Lecture Hall, Exhibition Hall, Rehearsal Hall, Dance Practice Room, Art Studio 1 & 2 and Music Practice Room 1 & 2. All are suitable for various types of cultural and arts activities.

== Facilities ==
- Theatre: 480 seats, stage area 10m X 10m
- Lecture Hall: 150 seats, stage area 6.9m X 4.5m
- Exhibition Hall: Area = 360m2
- Rehearsal Hall: Area = 224m2
- Dance Practice Room
- Art Studios = 28m2
- Music Practice Rooms = 14m2
