= Ying Fang =

Chinese operatic soprano (born 1987)

- Born: 1987 (age 38–39); Ningbo, China
- Education: Shanghai Conservatory of Music; Juilliard School
- Occupation: Operatic soprano
- Organizations: Metropolitan Opera

Ying Fang (Chinese: 方颖; pinyin: Fāng Yǐng; born 1987) is a Chinese operatic soprano. A principal soprano at the Metropolitan Opera, she won the Golden Bell Award at the Guangdong Singing Competition in China in 2009, first prize at the Gerda Lissner International Vocal Competition in 2013, and the Lincoln Center Segal Award in 2015. Her performances have been featured on the television program Great Performances at the Met and in movie theaters for the Metropolitan Opera Live in HD. In 2015 Opera News stated that "Ying Fang sings with exquisite simplicity and directness. The twenty-eight-year-old soprano never forces her sound or indulges in coloratura 'flash'. She is incapable of vulgarity; her dignity is unshakeable, and her powers of persuasion are sovereign."

== Life and career ==
Born in Ningbo, China, Fang earned a bachelor of music degree from the Shanghai Conservatory of Music where she was a pupil of Jingzu Bian. She went on to earn a master's degree and an artist diploma from the Juilliard School in New York City under the tutelage of Edith Bers before becoming a member of the Metropolitan Opera's Lindemann Young Artist Development Program. She performed in several operas at the Juilliard Opera Center, including portraying the roles of Fanny in Rossini's La cambiale di matrimonio (2012), The Spirit of the Boy in Britten's Curlew River (2012), Zerlina in Mozart's Don Giovanni (2012), Susanna in Mozart's The Marriage of Figaro (2015), and the title role in Gluck's Iphigénie en Aulide (2015, with conductor Jane Glover).

Ying has performed several roles with the Aspen Opera Theater, including Maria in Bernstein's West Side Story (2011) and Pamina in Mozart's The Magic Flute (2012). In 2013 she made her debut at the Wolf Trap Opera Company as La Contessa di Folleville in Il viaggio a Reims, and returned there the following year as Cleopatra in Handel's Giulio Cesare. In 2014 she sang Konstanze's arias from Mozart's Die Entführung aus dem Serail conducted by James Levine for a concert co-sponsored by the Metropolitan Opera and the Juilliard School at the Peter Jay Sharp Theater at Juilliard. In 2015 she performed arias by Mozart, Massenet, and Donizetti in concert with the Florida Orchestra.

Ying made her debut with the Metropolitan Opera in "The Met's Summer Recital Series" in the Bronx's Crotona Park in July 2013, singing arias from Donizetti's Don Pasquale, Handel's Semele and Alcina, and The Pirates of Penzance among other works. The following September she made her debut on the stage of the Metropolitan Opera House as the Female Voice and Podtochina's daughter in Shostakovich's The Nose. She has subsequently appeared at the Met as Barbarina in The Marriage of Figaro (2014), the Dew Fairy in Humperdinck's Hansel and Gretel (2014), and the Shepherd in Wagner's Tannhäuser (2015). In 2016 she returned to the Met as Giannetta in Donizetti's L'elisir d'amore. In March 2017, she appeared at the Met as Ilia in Mozart's Idomeneo. There, she has also appeared as Noémie in Massenet's Cendrillon (2018), and Zerlina in Mozart's Don Giovanni (2023).

In addition to her work as an opera singer, Ying also performs works from the concert repertoire. In 2013 she was the soprano soloist in Orff's Carmina Burana with the National Symphony Orchestra at the Wolf Trap National Park for the Performing Arts. In 2014 she performed Bach's Wedding Cantata and Bachianas Brasileiras No. 5 by Heitor Villa-Lobos with the Santa Cruz Symphony. That same year she was the soprano soloist in Mendelssohn's A Midsummer Night's Dream with the Baltimore Symphony Orchestra. In 2015 she was the soprano soloist in Mahler's Symphony No. 4 with both the Saint Paul Chamber Orchestra at Benson Great Hall and with the Mediterranean Youth Orchestra at the Festival d'Avignon and Aix-en-Provence Festival. In 2016 she performed as the soprano soloist in Mahler's Symphony No. 2 with the Chicago Symphony Orchestra at the Ravinia Festival.
