= Gu Shengying =

Shengying Gu (Chinese: 顾圣婴; 1937–1967) was a prominent Chinese classical concert pianist. In 1957, she won the gold medal at the 6th World Festival of Youth and Students in Moscow and in 1958, the women's piano award at the 14th Geneva International Music Competition. Suffering under the Cultural Revolution, when she was just 29 years old she committed suicide on 31 January 1967. In 2019, a commemorative wall on Yuyuan Road in Shanghai was inaugurated to revive memories of the years she lived there.

== Biography ==
Born in Shanghai on 2 July 1937, Shengying Gu was raised in a well-to-do home by parents with cultural interests. Taking piano lessons from the age of five, she was an outstanding student. From May 1953, she studied at the Shanghai Conservatory under Yang Jiaren and Li Jialu. Exceptionally talented, she developed a style full of sensitivity and poetic expression. When just 16, she played works by Bach, Beethoven, Schumann, Chopin and Brahms, soon becoming a soloist with the Shanghai Symphony Orchestra. After attending the Tianjin Central Music Academy from 1956 to 1960, she studied under the Soviet masters. In 1957, she participated in the Sixth World Youth Celebration Festival in Moscow, winning the gold medal. In 1960, she was placed sixth in the Warsaw Chopin Piano Competition. In 1964, she won an awarded for piano at Belgium's Queen Elisabeth Competition. She also won awards in Belgium, the Netherlands and Finland.

Gu's father, who as an entrepreneur in the 1940s had supported the Communists, was jailed in the early 1950s by the Communist Party, accused of being an agent of the Nationalists. At the beginning of the Cultural Revolution, Gu was accused by reactionaries at the Shanghai Conservatory of belonging to the famous and high-ranking people of the bad younger generation. After sending chocolate to her jailed father, Gu committed suicide by taking pills and turning on the gas. Her maternal uncle died in the same way. When Gu's father returned to Shanghai after the Cultural Revolution, he found he was the only surviving member of the family.

Shengying Gu died by suicide in Shanghai on 31 January 1967. It is not known where she is buried.
