= Jianyi Zhang =

American operatic tenor of Chinese birth

Jianyi Zhang (张建一 in Chinese) is an American operatic tenor of Chinese birth. A graduate of the Shanghai Conservatory of Music and the Juilliard School, he has had an active international career in concerts and operas since the mid-1980s. In 1987 he attended the summer conservatory program at the Music Academy of the West. He has sung leading roles at the Metropolitan Opera, the New York City Opera, the Opéra-Comique, the Paris Opera, the Staatsoper Stuttgart, the Teatro Comunale Florence, the Vienna State Opera, and the Washington National Opera to name just a few. His concert appearances include performances with the Deutsches Symphonie-Orchester Berlin, the Helsinki Philharmonic Orchestra, the London Philharmonic Orchestra, the National Symphony Orchestra, the Orchestre Philharmonique de Radio France, and the Pittsburgh Symphony Orchestra.

As an educator, he joined Zhejiang Conservatory of Music in 2018 to chair the voice department.
