= Zhou Yi (musician) =

Chinese pipa player

Zhou Yi (Chinese: 周懿; pinyin: Zhōu Yì) is a Chinese pipa player.

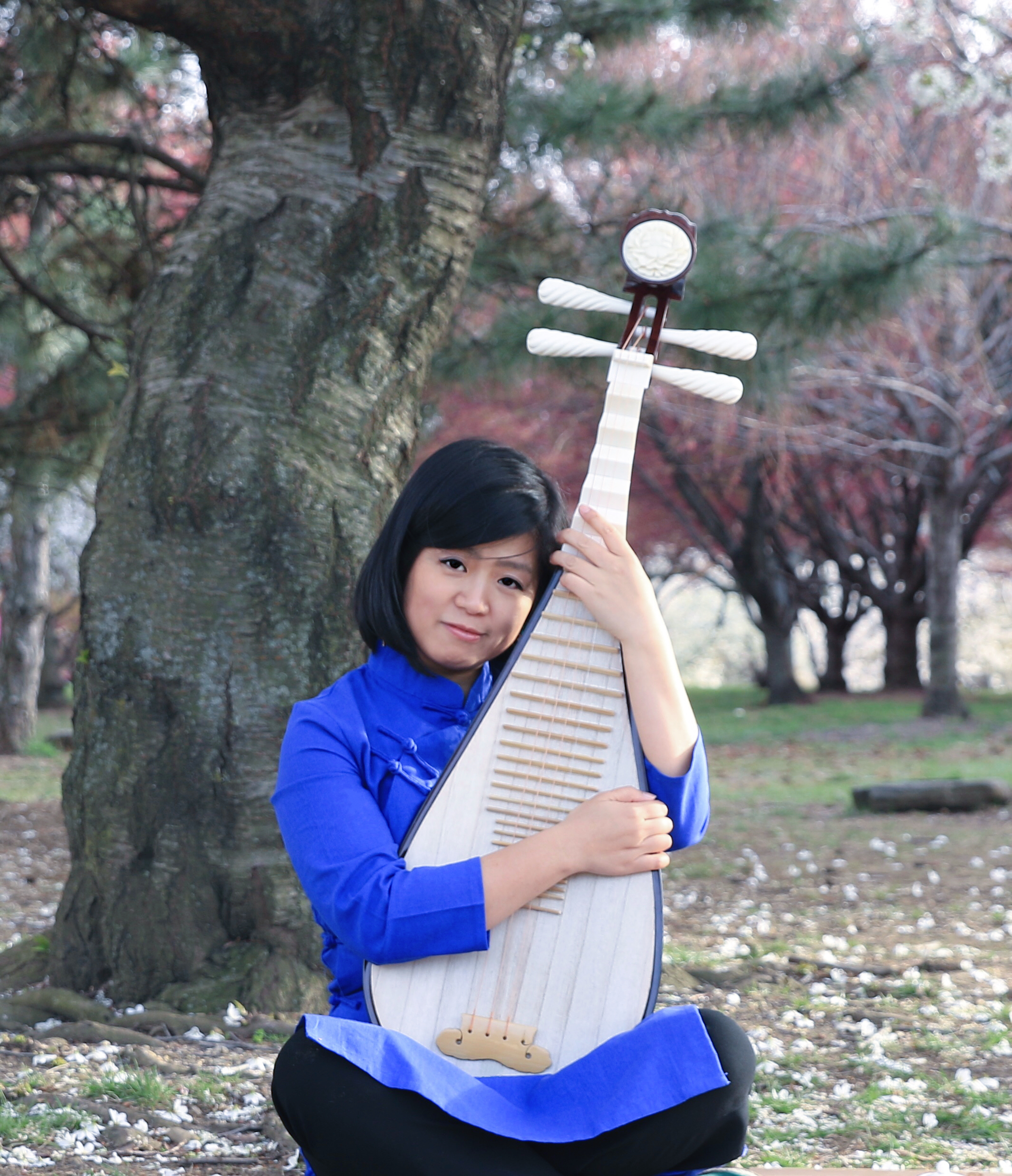

Praised for her “breathtaking” meticulous technique and expressiveness by the Washington Post (Stephen Brookes, August 2013), New York-based pipa (Chinese lute) and qin (Chinese zither) soloist Zhou Yi (pronounced “Jo-E”) was born in Shanghai, China. At the age of five, Zhou Yi was discovered in kindergarten by a Chinese instrumentalist talent scout, Yuanlong Cao. Zhou Yi gave her first public recital at six and won first prize in the Shanghai Spring Music Festival at the age of eight. She continued training for two years on the pipa before enrolling in the elementary school of the Shanghai Conservatory of Music, one of China's premier music schools. Two pipa students, out of thousands, were selected for a position in the school. At the age of sixteen, her music was recorded and published by New Era Sound & Video Company of Guangzhou and Nanjing Video Publishing House of China. These recordings are used for future generations of music students to study as ideal renditions of these pieces. During her time in the Shanghai Conservatory of Music, she studied Shanghai-style pipa performance under pipa masters Zupei Zhang, Ya Dong, and Xuran Ye (recorded Dunhuang pipa music in 1982). Meanwhile, she learned qin as her second major with the Guangling-style qin and xiao (Chinese vertical end-blown flute) master Shuhong Dai.

After graduating from the Shanghai Conservatory of Music, Zhou Yi moved to New York and has been heard in various venues throughout the United States. She has performed in places such as Carnegie Hall, Merkin Concert Hall, John Hancock Hall, Pickman Concert Hall and the Metropolitan Museum of Art. She has also conducted Chinese music workshops and gave lectures at New York University, Columbia University, Harvard University, Princeton University, Yale University, the Peabody Conservatory of Music, the Eastman School of Music, the New England Conservatory of Music, and the Longy School of Music.

As a concert soloist, Zhou Yi has travelled across Asia, North America and Europe. Some of her highlight performances and concerto repertoire include: Tan Dun's Concerto for Pipa and String Orchestra at the Gewandhaus in Leipzig Germany; Young People's Concert with the New York Philharmonic; Bun-Ching Lam's Song of the Pipa with the Metropolitan Symphony Orchestra; Zuqiang Wu's Sisters of the Grassland (the first pipa concerto) with the Ohio Youngstown Symphony Orchestra; Shih-Hui Chen's Jin (Metal) for pipa and orchestra; Tan Dun's Ghost Opera with the Momenta Quartet; Bright Sheng's Three Songs for Violoncello and Pipa; Chen Yi's Points and Ancient Dances for pipa and percussion; Zhou Long's Green for flute and pipa; Victoria Bond's Bridges for erhu, pipa and two clarinets; Bingyang Li's Snow of June for mixed ensemble (world premiere at Carnegie Hall); Thomas Reiner's Sweet Spots for double bass clarinet, pipa and orchestra (world premiere in Alaska CrossSound Music Festival). Zhou Yi also collaborated with young Chinese composers’ premiere works in various styles, such as: Dongqing Fang's Drunken Master for piano, cello and pipa (North America premiere, Carnegie Hall 2017); Xinyan Li's Dunhuang Lovers for flute, cello and pipa (world premiere, Carnegie Hall 2017); Jianbing Hu's Fine Sound from Tianzhu for pipa and cello (world premiere, NEC Jordan Hall 2017); Angel Lam's theatric work, Lost in Shanghai (world premiere, National Sawdust 2017); Qian Zhou's Qu Shui Ming Yun (Sounds from the Winding Water) for qin and electronic (world premiere, Mata Festival 2016); Du Yun's Kung Fu (The Bruce Lee Story) soundtrack for David Henry Huang's off-broadway production (world premiere 2014).

Zhou Yi's other guest appearances in operatic and festival productions are: guest qin artist in Bright Sheng's Dream of the Red Chamber (San Francisco Opera 2016); guest pipa and qin artist in Huang Ruo's Paradise Interrupted (Lincoln Center Festival 2016) and Dr. Sun Yat-sen (Santa Fe Opera 2014); Chen Shi-Zheng's the Peony Pavilion, the Orphan of Zhao and Ghost Lovers with the Lincoln Center Festival; Bun-Ching Lam's Wen Ji - Eighteen Songs of Nomad Flute with the New York Asia Society; the Shen Wei Dance Arts’ Second Visit to the Empress with the American Dance Festival; the Bowling Green New Music & Art Festival.

Zhou Yi's other style crossover performances include: collaborating with the Hollywood music producer Rickey Minor and performing with Rihanna at the 2015 Met Gala; conducting music workshops in public schools for the China National Traditional Orchestra's 2015 U.S. tour; recording the music for David Henry Hwang's off-broadway production, The Dance and the Railroad; working with Damon Albarn (Gorillaz/Blur) in Spoleto Festival's premiere show, Monkey - Journey To The West; improvising the music for the off-broadway show Around the World in 80 Days; improvising the music in visual artist Shahzia Silkander's Parallax at the Linda Pace Foundation; joining Carnegie Hall's world music educational program.

Zhou Yi currently resides in New York City. She is a co-founder and artistic director of the Ba Ban Chinese Music Society of New York. Leading the group, she has produced three sold-out productions: Silk and Bamboo Music from the Yangtze River; Golden Age of the 1930s & 40s Shanghai Jazz Music; and Red Chinese Tradition which were received a commendation from the New York City Council for exemplary cultural service to the community.
