= Xiao Youmei =

Chinese composer

Xiao Youmei 蕭友梅
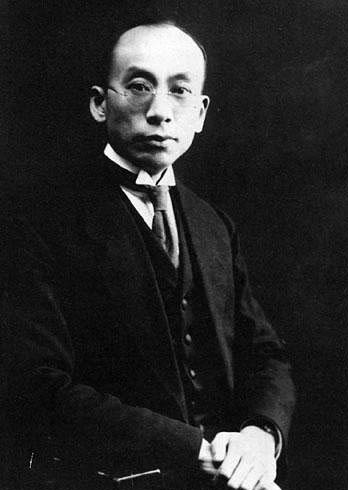

Background information
- Born: Xiao Youmei; 7 January 1884; Zhongshan County, Guangdong, China
- Died: 31 December 1940 (aged 56) Shanghai, China
- Occupations: Composer, music educator

Xiao Youmei (Chinese: 蕭友梅; pinyin: Xiāo Yǒuméi; formerly transliterated Shio Yiu-mei; 7 January 1884 – 31 December 1940) was a noted Chinese music educator and composer. He was also styled as Sīhè (思鶴) and Xuěpéng (雪朋).

== Life ==
Xiao was born in Zhongshan County, Guangdong to a musical family. From an early age in Macao he experienced firsthand Western music. In 1899, he enrolled at Guangzhou's Shihmin Junior High School (時敏學堂). In 1901, he studied abroad in Japan, studying pedagogy, piano, and voice. In 1906, he joined the Tongmenghui. In 1910, he returned to China, where he achieved the degree "recommended man" (juren 擧人) on the imperial examination for students who studied abroad. Not long after, he studied abroad again, this time in Germany, at Königliches Konservatorium der Musik zu Leipzig (now the University of Music and Theatre Leipzig) and Leipzig University, where he completed the Ph.D. His doctoral thesis was "Eine geschichtliche Untersuchung über das chinesische Orchester bis zum 17. Jahrhundert (Historical Research on the Pre-Seventeenth Century Chinese Orchestra)" (1916); it was translated into Chinese only in 1990. Hugo Riemann was his supervisor. In October 1916, he entered the philosophy department of Berlin University where he continued research.

Returning to China, in 1920, he served as the reviewing editor for the Republic of China's Ministry of Education. In 1921, he served as the director of National Beijing University's "Music Research Group." In 1922, in accordance with his recommendation, this group was formally renamed "Music Research Institute of Beijing University." He also became this institute's managing director. In 1927, Cai Yuanpei supported him to found China's first specialized institute of higher education for music, the National College of Music. In September 1929, according to his plan it was upgraded to the National Institute for Music (in 1949 it was renamed the Shanghai Conservatory, which it remains today). He served as the president of the institute, until his death from illness in 1940. He himself designed the "Old Music Research Revolution" curriculum (and Chinese ancient music history), and also wrote the textbooks himself.

== Works ==
Xiao Youmei also was one of China's first composers to master Western compositional techniques and incorporate them in his works. In his lifetime, he wrote over 100 pieces. These include piano works, orchestral pieces, violin and other string pieces, and choral works. Among his notable students is the famous Chinese composer and music educator Lin Shengyi, who once studied harmony with him. He wrote many textbooks, including ones for organ (1924), piano (1924), violin (1927), harmony (1927), and general music (1928). In addition, he also wrote over fifty music publications.

On the seventieth anniversary of his death, a bronze statue of Xiao Youmei was erected at the Beijing Concert Hall by the Central Conservatory of Music, the China National Symphony Orchestra, and the China Symphony Development Foundation.
