= Composers and Authors Society of Hong Kong =

Copyright society in Hong Kong

- Composers and Authors Society of Hong Kong Ltd.
- 香港作曲家及作詞家協會有限公司
- Abbreviation: CASH
- Formation: September 23, 1977; 48 years ago
- Location: 18/F Universal Trade Center 3 Arbuthnot Rd Central, Hong Kong
- Website: CASH

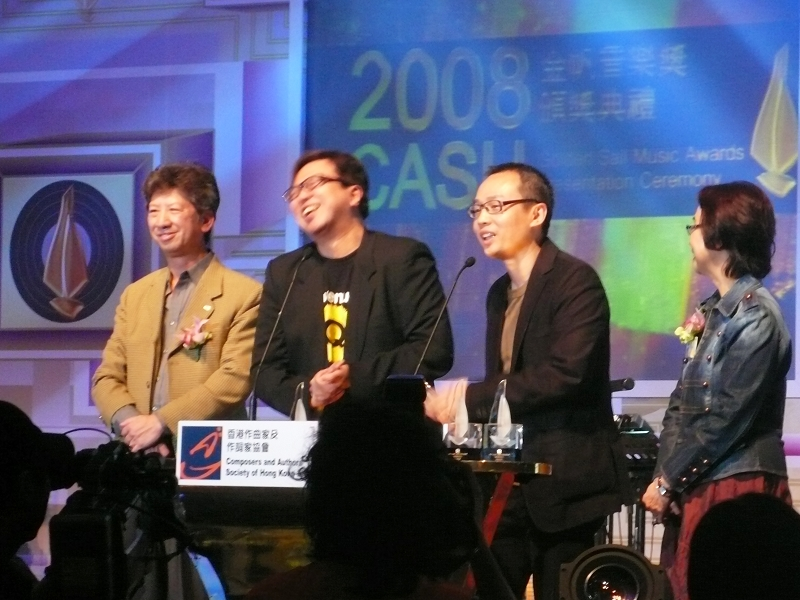
2008 CASH Annual Dinner & Golden Sail Music Awards Presentation

Composers and Authors Society of Hong Kong Ltd. (Chinese: 香港作曲家及作詞家協會有限公司; CASH) is a copyright collection society in Hong Kong established in 1977 which aims to administer and enforce collectively the rights of composers and authors (lyricists) of musical works subsisting under the copyright law of Hong Kong. CASH has established the CASH Music Fund to promote a higher standard of local music composition and to encourage and develop songwriting talent by sponsoring a wide range of musical activities in Hong Kong.

CASH at present represents over 2 million songwriters including local members and, by means of reciprocal representation agreements, members from more than 200 countries and 80 overseas affiliated societies. All licence fees received after deduction of its administrative costs are distributed to local Members and overseas affiliated societies.

== History ==
Composers and Authors Society of Hong Kong Limited was incorporated on 23 September 1977. It was established by a group of local composers to replace the UK-based Performing Rights Society in Hong Kong, which had been operating in the city since 1946.

== Work ==
- Manage and safeguard the public performance, broadcasting, cable transmission, new media network, and reproduction rights of works by CASH members and overseas affiliated society members.
- Distribute the collected copyright royalties to the relevant members.
- Educate the public about music copyright awareness.
- The "CASH Music Fund" sponsors local groups to commission composers for new works, nurturing emerging talent.

== Council of Directors ==
=== Chairman ===
Prof. Chan Wing Wah, JP

=== Writer Directors ===
Mr Chan Siu Kei

Mr Alvin Leong

Dr Mui Kwong Chiu

Mr Chan Wing Him

=== Publisher Directors ===
Mr Tony Chu

Tonic Music Limited

Mr Jonathan Ho

Fujipacific Music (S. E. Asia) Ltd

Ms Carol Ng

Sony Music Publishing (Hong Kong) Limited

Mr Spencer Lee

Peermusic (S. E. Asia) Limited

== Awards ==
- CASH Golden Sail Most Performed Works Awards
  - Cantonese Pop Work
  - Mandarin Pop Work
  - English Pop Work
  - Digital Song
  - Chinese Operatic Work
  - Local Serious Work
  - Highest No. of New Works Performed (Composer & Author)
- CASH Golden Sail Music Awards
  - CASH Best Song
  - Best Melody
  - Best Lyrics
  - Best Arrangement
  - Best Vocal Collaborations
  - Best Performance by a Band
  - Best Vocal Performance by a Female Artist
  - Best Vocal Performance by a Male Artist
  - Best Serious Composition
  - Best Young Composer’s Serious Composition
- CASH Hall of Fame Award
- CASH I Sing My Song Award
- CASH Best Singer-songwriter Award (jointly presented by CASH and RTHK)
