= C AllStar =

Hong Kong Cantopop boy band

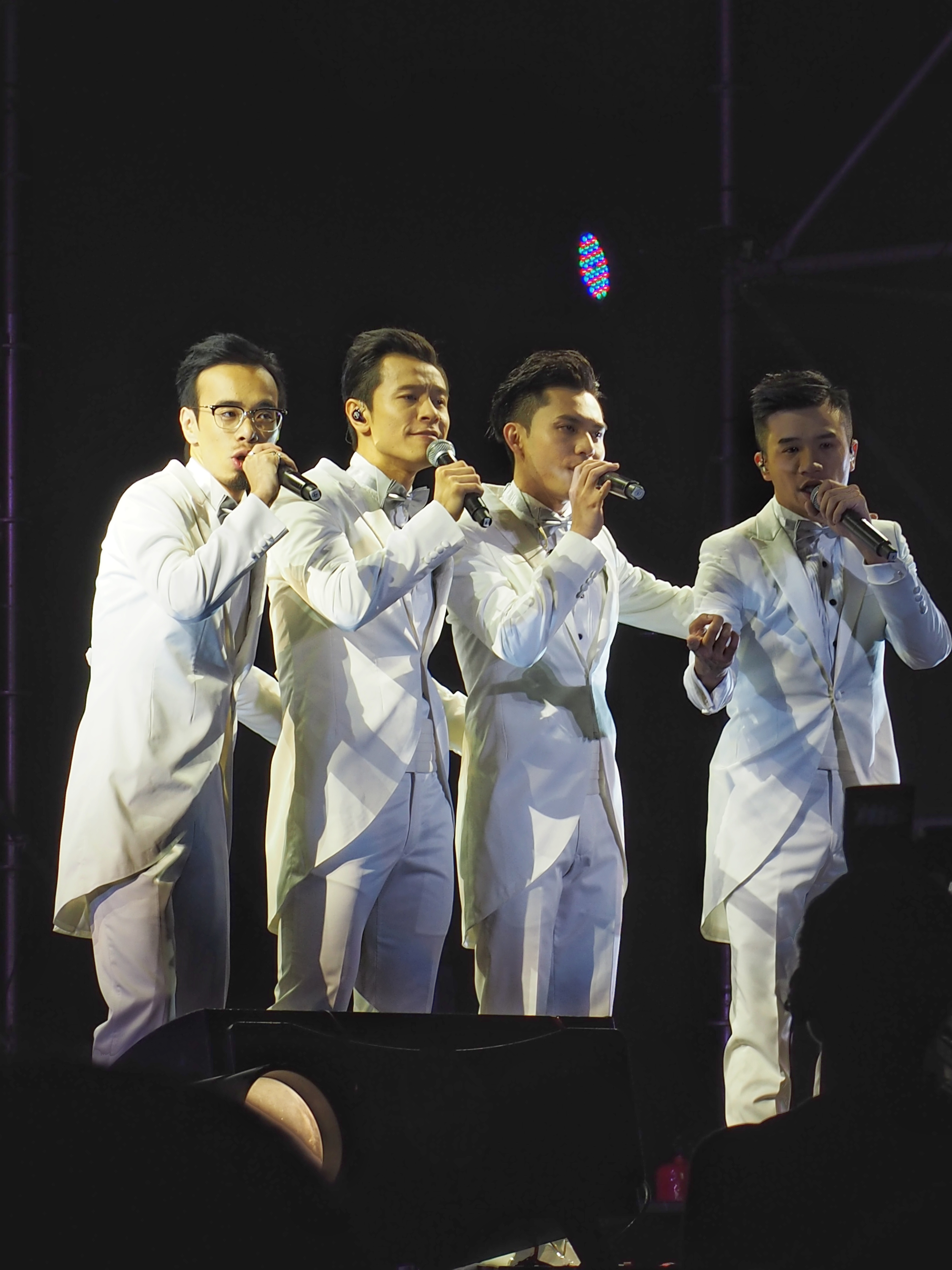
- C AllStar in 2016; from left to right: Jase Ho, On Chan, King Wu, Andy Leung

Background information
- Origin: Hong Kong
- Genres: Cantopop
- Years active: 2009–2017, 2021–present
- Labels: Kingdom C (since 2009); Media Asia Music (since 2011)
- Members: King Wu (DJ King); Kenny Chan (On Jai); Andy Leung (Chiu Fung); Jase Ho (SoulJase)

C AllStar is a Hong Kong Cantopop boy band formed through a singing contest Star Hunt (星投大戰) held by Kingdom C in 2009. The group consists of four members: King Wu, Kenny Chan, Andy Leung, and Jase Ho. They debuted with the album Make It Happen in 2010.

The group is best known for their a cappella singing and the most prominent song is "Tin Tai" (天梯; 'sky ladder'). They have won various music awards since their debut, including four times Ultimate Song Chart Award for Group of the Year (Gold), four times JSG Awards Presentation Best Musical Group, etc.

== Career ==
=== 2009–2010: Star Hunt and debut ===
In 2009, Hong Kong music label Kingdom C held a singing contest Star Hunt (星投大戰). King Wu, Andy Leung, Kenny Chan, and Jase Ho were the four semi-finalists of the contest. They gained popularity from busking at the pedestrian zone on Sai Yeung Choi Street South.

In 2010, they released "Tin Tai" (天梯; 'sky ladder'). They were inspired by a story of a couple in Chongqing who had been living in the mountains for more than 50 years. The song went famous overnight and was charted on multiple local charts. They also won multiple awards with the song in the following year.

=== 2011–2017: Rising popularity ===
In July 2011, they held their first concert. They joined Media Asia Music in October.

In October 2013, they released the album Cantopopsibility. The album adopted different music styles, including trance, bossa nova, rhythm and blues, etc. In March 2014, they held a concert at the Hong Kong Coliseum for the first time, named Our Woodstock Concert 2014 (我們的胡士托演唱會2014).

In 2017, it was announced that there would be a concert at the Hong Kong Coliseum for the second time. The members competed against one another to win the chance to solo since their producer decided that there wasn't enough time for all four members to solo. The winner was voted by netizens. At last, Jase Ho won the chance to solo.

=== 2017–2020: Hiatus ===
In January 2017, the group announced that they would disband after the concert in October. King Wu explained that they feel like the life in the group is somewhat disheartened and they would like to pursue solo activities so that members can evolve in more specific fields.

In the light of anti-extradition bill protests, the group temporarily reunited and released "You Are Not Alone" (沒有剩你一個) in July 2019, noting "we are all together in the storm".

In August 2020, the group built a virtual Hong Kong Colliseum stage and held a live virtual Minecraft concert named Make It Happen @ 10 C AllStar Virtual Live on the 10th anniversary of their debut, becoming the first in Asia to do so.

=== 2021–present: Reunion ===
On 25 January 2021, C AllStar announced on Facebook that they would officially work as a group again. Three days later, "Together We Strive For A Better World" (集合吧！地球保衛隊) was released. The song charted first in all five music charts in Hong Kong. On 15 April 2021, amid the wave of emigration from Hong Kong, the group released the song "For those who stay, For those who had left" (留下來的人), quoting the scripts from Tenet: "What’s happened, happened. Which is an expression of fate in the mechanics of the world. It’s not an excuse to do nothing." The song charted first in all five music charts in Hong Kong, making the group become the first to have two songs to do so in the same year. They held three concerts later in the year, including one with Joyce Cheng.

In January 2022, local media reported that ten Canto-pop singers and groups had been put on a blacklist of government-funded broadcaster RTHK, with radio DJs having been ordered not to play their songs. C AllStar was reportedly on the list. In response to a letter by lawmaker Tik Chi-yuen requesting clarification, RTHK wrote: "RTHK has been supporting the development of Chinese pop music. Program hosts choose songs based on professionalism and suitability to the programs."

== Discography ==
=== Studio albums ===
- Make it Happen (2010)
- 新預言書 (first edition) (2011)
- 新預言書 (second edition) (2012)
- To Begin From The End (2012)
- Cantopopsibility (2013)
- 時日如飛 C AllCollection (2014)
- 生於斯 (2015)
- 此刻無價 C AllCollection (2017)
- 人類世 (2021)

=== Live albums ===
- 2012 C AllLive (2013)
- 我們的胡士托演唱會 (2014)
- 生於C AllStar 演唱會 2017 Live (2017)
- C AllStar集合吧! 演唱會2021 (2021)

=== Extended plays ===
- 我們的胡士托 (2011)
- Collab Star (2015)
- LoveaHolic Vol.1 (2017)
- LoveaHolic Vol.2 (2017)

== See also ==
- Lai Ying Tong
