= Shanghai Conservatory of Music =

Music school in Shanghai, China

- 上海音乐学院
- Type: Public
- Established: 27 November 1927; 98 years ago
- President: Liao Changyong
- Location: Shanghai, China
- Website: shcmusic.edu.cn

Shanghai Conservatory of Music
- Simplified Chinese: 上海音乐学院
- Traditional Chinese: 上海音樂學院
Transcriptions
Standard Mandarin
- Hanyu Pinyin: Shànghǎi Yīnyuè Xuéyuàn

The Shanghai Conservatory of Music (SHCMusic) is a municipal public college in Shanghai, China. It is affiliated with the City of Shanghai and is part of the Double First-Class Construction. The college was founded on November 27, 1927.

== History ==
The Shanghai Conservatory of Music is a music institute famous at home and abroad. It grew out of the National Conservatory of Music (Guoli yinyueyuan 国立音乐院), which was established by Cai Yuanpei on November 27, 1927. Dr. Xiao Youmei (Shio Yiu-mei) was the director of the new school and curriculum. His teachings were based on the Leipzig Conservatory of Music, where he graduated. Its founding was a major milestone in modern music education in China. It was considered the premiere institution for Western music learning. Professors came from as far as Russia and France. Several of the original professors were recruited from Russian emigres who had fled the Russian civil war (1918-1922) to China.

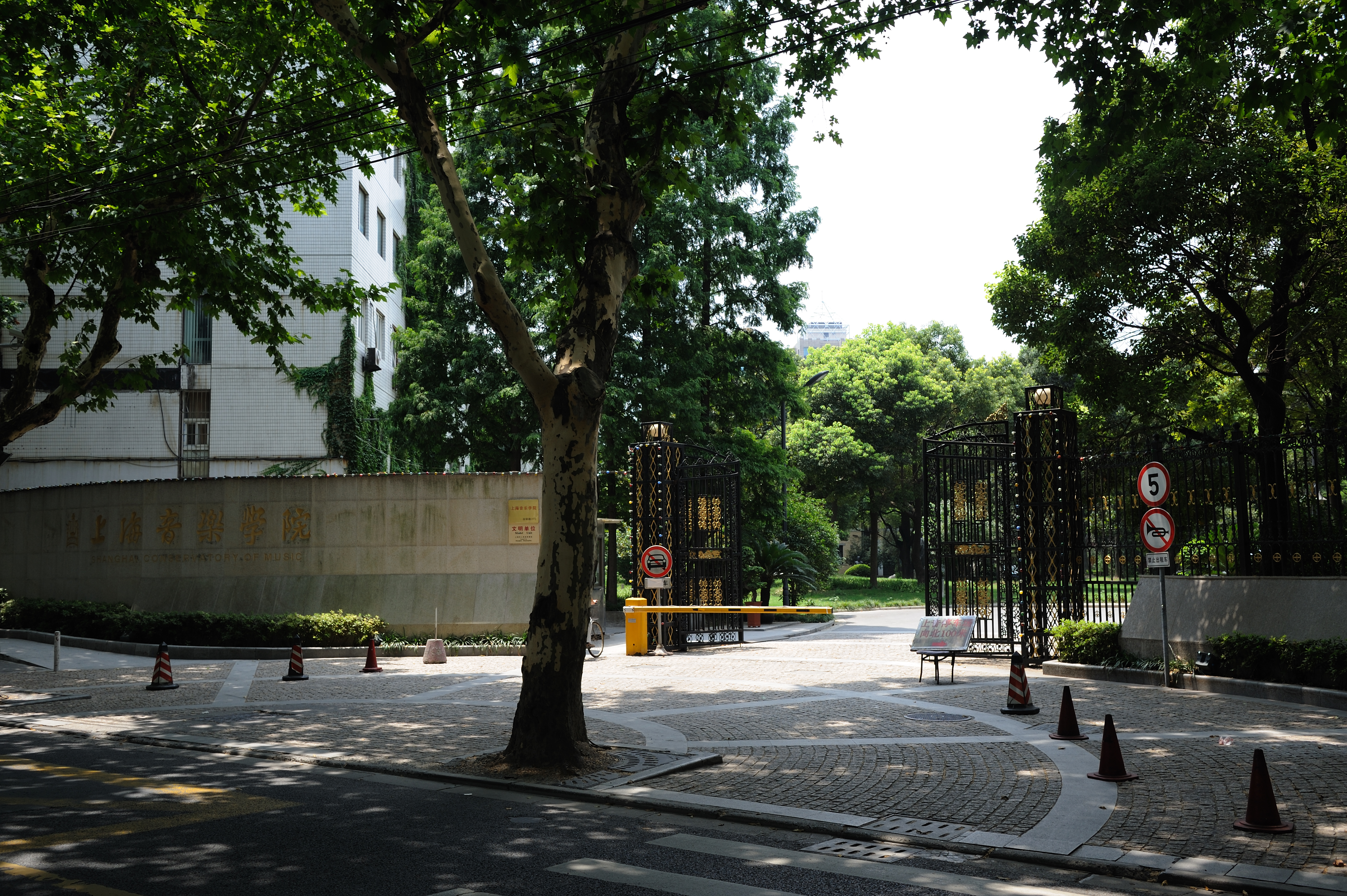
Front gate of the Shanghai Conservatory of Music

It was renamed several times: National Training School of Music (1929), Branch of National Conservatory of Music (1943), Shanghai National Training School of Music (1945), Shanghai and Huadong Branches of Chinese Conservatory of Music (early 1950s). It received its current name in 1956.

== Programs ==
The Shanghai Conservatory of Music consists of 4 departments. It involves six disciplines and 23 sub-disciplines, some traditional, the others newly developed.

The conservatory supports a high-level music research institute, a specialized music library with a large collection, a first-class museum of Asian instruments, and a unique music publishing house.

A six-year secondary school and a three-year elementary section were established in 1953 and 1956 to prepare better candidates for tertiary education, thus forming a self-contained system with a complete curriculum of music and academic education.

Three art centers integrate teaching, performing and scientific research: Zhou Xiaoyan International Opera Center, International String Academy, and International Piano Art Center. The conservatory has established six performing groups: Symphony Orchestra of Shanghai Conservatory of Music, New Ensemble, String Quartet, Percussion Ensemble, National Music Orchestra and Choir.

Shanghai Conservatory of Music maintains close relationships with many first-class conservatories and famous musicians, including collaborations with schools in the US, France, UK, Russia, Netherlands, Australia, Austria, Germany and Japan. Many internationally well-known musicians such as Isaac Stern, Itzhak Perlman, Yuri Shishkin, Leon Fleisher, Pinchas Zukerman, Seiji Ozawa, Simon Rattle, Mstislav Rostropovich, and Yo-Yo Ma have served as honorary or guest professors.

== Rankings and reputation ==
As of 2021, Shanghai Conservatory of Music ranked no.4 nationwide among universities specialized in Arts in the recognized Best Chinese Universities Ranking and ranked the best in China in the "Music and Dance" subject.

Shanghai Conservatory of Music is regarded as the most prestigious music and arts school in China. It ranked 2nd in China after (the Central Academy of Drama in Beijing) and 43rd in the world by the 2022 QS World University Rankings in Performing Arts. It ranked 10th in Music and 30th in Performing Arts in the world by the 2024 QS World University Rankings by subject.

== Departments ==
=== Degree awarding departments ===
Department	Duration		
Department	Bachelor's degree	Master's degree	Doctorate degree
Voice and Opera	5 years	3 years	3 - 6 years
Musicology	4 years (Musical Instrument Fabrication and Repair) 5 years (Musicology)	3 years	3 - 6 years
Composition and Conducting	4 years (Solfeggio) 5 years (Others)	3 years	3 - 6 years
Piano	4 years	3 years	3 - 6 years
Orchestral Instruments	4 years	3 years	3 - 6 years
Traditional Chinese Instruments	4 years	3 years	3 - 6 years
Music Engineering	4 years	3 years	3 - 6 years
Modern Instruments and Percussion	4 years	3 years	3 - 6 years
Arts administration	4 years	3 years	/
Music Education	4 years	3 years	/
Musical Theatre	4 years	3 years	/
Digital Media Art School	4 years	3 years	/

=== Other departments ===
- General Education
- School of Marxism
- Secondary Professional Music School Affiliated to Shanghai Conservatory of Music

== Directors of the Conservatory ==
- Cai Yuanpei 蔡元培 (1927-1928)
- Xiao Youmei 萧友梅 (1928-1940)
- Li Weining 李惟宁 (1940-1945)
- Dai Cuilun 戴粹伦 (1945-1949)
- He Luting 贺绿汀 (1949-1984)
- Sang Tong 桑桐 (acting, 1984-1986)
- Sang Tong 桑桐 (1986-1991)
- Jiang Mingdun 江明惇 (1991-2000)
- Yang Liqing 杨立青 (2000-2009)
- Xu Shuya 许舒亚 (2009-2014)
- Lin Zaiyong 林在勇 (2015-2018)
- Liao Changyong 廖昌永 (2019-)

== Faculty and student body ==
The conservatory has 50 professors and 120 associate professors. There are approximately 1,200 students.

== Notable faculty and alumni ==
=== Faculty ===
- Huang Tzu (1904-1938), composer
- He Luting (1903-1999), composer, alumnus and former president of the Shanghai Conservatory of Music. The main music hall on campus was later named after him.
- Ding Shande (1911-1995), composer, alumnus and former vice president of the Shanghai Conservatory of Music
- Zhou Xiaoyan (1917-2016), operatic soprano, former vice president of the Shanghai Conservatory of Music
- Wen Kezheng (1929-2007), operatic bass, former Director of the Department of Vocal Music and Opera
- Zhu Jian'er (1922-2017), Chinese symphonic composer and songwriter
- Vladimir Shushlin (1896-1978), Russian vocal teacher
- Liao Changyong, operatic baritone, alumnus and the president of the Shanghai Conservatory of Music
- Ying Huang, operatic soprano, alumnus and professor at the Department of Vocal Music and Opera
- Yingdi Sun, pianist, alumnus and the deputy director of the Department of Piano
- He Xuntian, composer, alumnus and professor at the Department of Composition and Conducting

=== Alumni ===
- Lü Ji - composer of revolutionary music
- Yi-Kwei Sze - bass-baritone
- Wang Jianzhong - composer and pianist
- Min Huifen - erhu musician
- Muhai Tang - conductor
- Jianyi Zhang - operatic tenor
- Wei Song - operatic tenor
- Rui Shi Zhuo - composer
- Jampa Tsering - singer and dancer
- Yang Erche Namu - writer and singer
- Jian Wang - cellist
- Yu Long - conductor
- Liu Fang - pipa musician
- Jiaxin Cheng - cellist
- Du Yun - composer, performer, performance artist
- Shenyang - bass-baritone
- Yu Di - singer
- Chang Shilei - singer, music producer and songwriter
- Yu Guanqun - operatic soprano
- Chen Zhiyi - composer and music producer
- Ying Fang - operatic soprano
- Mei Gui Zhang - operatic soprano
- Cai Chengyu - operatic tenor
- Zhou Yi - pipa musician
