= List of Chinese composers =

List of Chinese composers by year of birth:

- Xian Xinghai (冼星海) - (1905–1945)
- Nie Er (聂耳) - (1912–1935) known for "March of the Volunteers", the national anthem of People's Republic of China.
- Ma Sicong (马思聪) - (1912–1987)
- Jian'er Zhu (朱践耳) - (1922-2017)
- Chou Wen-chung (周文中) - (1923–2019) noted protogé and longtime professor at Columbia University.
- Du Mingxin (杜鸣心) - (born 1928)
- Chen Gang (陈刚) - (1935-2026)
- Wang Xilin (王西麟) - (born 1937)
- Chen Qigang (陈其钢) - (born 1951)
- Qu Xiaosong (瞿小松) - (born 1952)
- Chen Yi (陈怡) - (born 1953) first Chinese female composer to receive a Master of Arts from the Central Conservatory of Music.
- Jing Jing Luo (罗京京) - (born 1953)
- Zhou Long (周龙) - (born 1953)
- Ge Gan-ru (葛甘孺) - (born 1954)
- Liu Sola (刘索拉) - (born 1955)
- Ye Xiaogang (叶小纲) - (born 1955)
- Bright Sheng (盛宗亮) - (born 1955) professor at University of Michigan
- Su Cong (苏聪) - (born 1957)
- Tan Dun (谭盾) - (born 1957)
- Yang Jing (杨静) - (born 1963)
- Lei Liang (梁雷) - (born 1972)
- Huang Ruo (黄若) - (born 1976)
- Du Yun (杜韵) - (born 1977)
- Elliot Leung (梁皓) - (born 1995)
