= Center for US-China Arts Exchange =

Former US-based foundation

- 美中藝術交流中心
- Founded: October 1, 1978; 47 years ago
- Founder: Chou Wen-chung
- Dissolved: 2019
- Location(s): Columbia University New York City, New York, U.S.
- Region served: United States, China, Asia
- Method: Grants, funding, fellowships
- Owner: Columbia University
- Website: www.uschinaarts.org

The Center for US-China Arts Exchange was a private, not-for-profit, national organization with the mission to promote greater understanding and mutual cooperation between the United States and the People's Republic of China through interaction in the arts.

Established at Columbia University in 1978 by composer and Professor Chou Wen-chung, the center was launched with initial funding from the Rockefeller Brothers Fund, the Ford Foundation and the Henry Luce Foundation. Later donors included the Starr Foundation, the Asian Cultural Council, the United Board for Christian Higher Education in Asia and the MacArthur Foundation. The Chinese Ministry of Culture was the center's counterpart in China and funded the domestic expenses of many of the programs carried out there. The first U.S.-based organization to sponsor exchanges between the two countries solely in the arts, the Center organized projects designed to create a network of cultural relationships between two countries that had been estranged for thirty years.

Upon its establishment, the center was supported by figures in the cultural sphere as well as in academia and the business world. Members of the Advisory Council included conductor Leonard Bernstein, cellist Yo-Yo Ma, playwright Arthur Miller, architect I.M. Pei, violinist Cho-Liang Lin, author Herman Wouk and Nobel Prize winning physicist Yang Chen-ning.

American figures in the arts were among those eager to visit China. Violinist Isaac Stern was the first, making a performance tour in 1979 with pianist David Golub. The Center arranged for a film crew to document their trip. The resulting film, "From Mao to Mozart: Isaac Stern in China", won an Academy Award. Other prominent figures who made professional visits to China under the center's auspices, were Arthur Miller, Susan Sontag, Ming Cho Lee, Alwin Nikolais and many others in all the fields of the visual, literary and performing arts. In 1990 the Center expanded its scope beyond urban centers to include programs of cultural and environmental conservation in rural Yunnan Province. Participants as diverse as architects, museum designers, shamanists and amphibian experts took part in projects to support the endangered lifestyle and landscape of Yunnan's ethnic minority groups.

In 2018, the Center completed its role as program designer, facilitator and fundraiser, concluding forty years of innovative exchange work. The center's archives have been acquired by Columbia University's C.V. Starr East Asian Library and are available to researchers by appointment.

== History ==
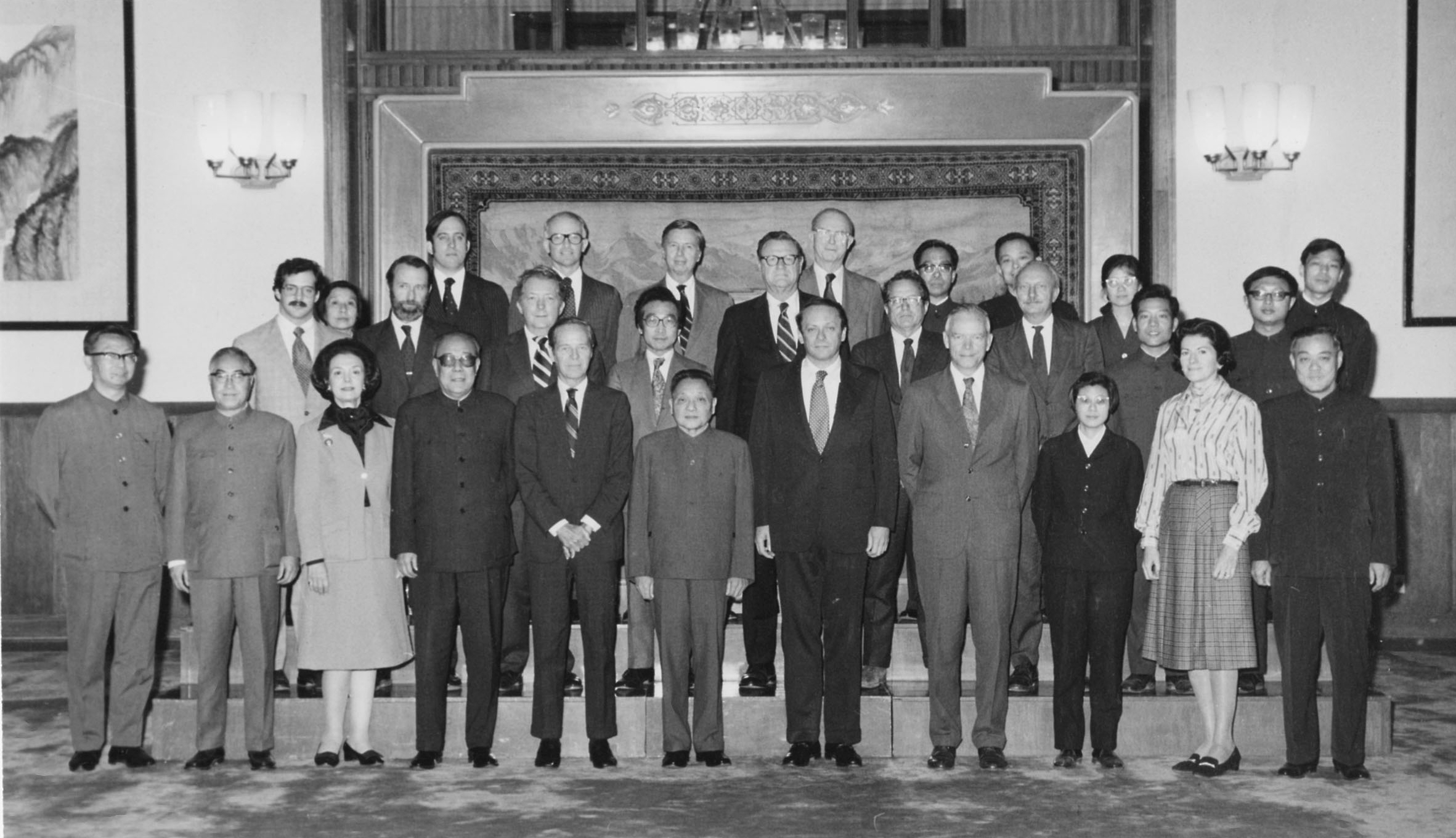
Deng Xiaoping, Chou Wen-chung and the National Committee on US-China Relations. Beijing, China, 1977.

The Center for U.S.-China Arts Exchange was established at Columbia University in 1978 as a cultural response to the political rapprochement of the U.S. and the People's Republic of China following a hiatus of thirty years. Founder Chou Wen-chung saw China's re-opening as an opportunity for resurgence of the arts in China. The stated mission of the center was to stimulate public interest in the arts of both countries to foster mutual respect. The strategy was to initiate systematic exchanges between organizations and individuals that would bring together creative minds from contrasting cultures and would benefit both countries.

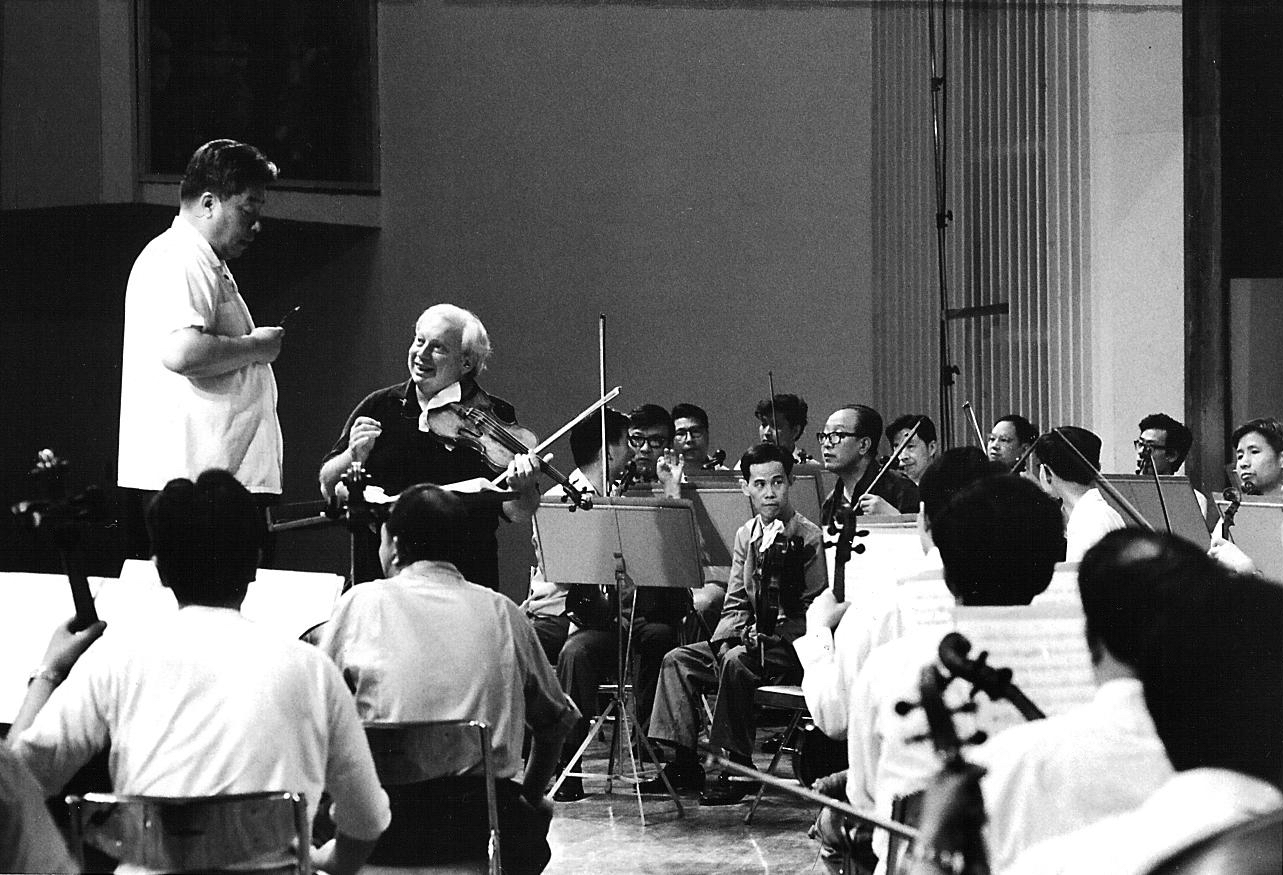
Isaac Stern rehearsing with the Central Philharmonic Orchestra in China, 1979.

Shortly after President Nixon made his historic trip to Beijing in 1972, Chou visited China for the first time since his departure twenty-six years earlier. China was still in the midst of the Cultural Revolution and communication was restricted, but he managed to meet with old classmates from the Shanghai Conservatory of Music and plant the seeds. In 1977, he visited again to give a lecture at the Central Conservatory of Music in Beijing to an audience of cultural leaders and government officials. After his presentation, he proposed the establishment of an arts exchange program between the two countries. Officials put him in touch with Wang Bingnan, director of the Chinese People's Association for Friendship with Foreign Countries, a "people-to-people" agency. On the first of October of the following year, Chou signed an agreement with Wang Bingnan and the center was officially launched.

Three months later, on January 1, 1979, the United States and the People's Republic of China normalized diplomatic relations in an agreement signed by President Jimmy Carter. The Center then began to work directly with the Chinese Ministry of Culture to carry out a range of exchange programs focused mainly on professionals working in urban centers in the visual, literary and performing arts. In 1990, the Center expanded its scope to include programs of cultural and environmental conservation in support of ethnic minorities in rural Yunnan Province.

During the next forty years, the Center carried out exchange programs that ranged from single master classes in music to symphonic performances; interaction between several dancers, to the first performances of Balanchine ballets in China; and poets working with schoolchildren, to a joint Chinese-American PEN writers' symposium and the staging of Arthur Miller's Death of a Salesman in Beijing.

In 2018, the Center completed its role as program designer, facilitator and fundraiser, concluding forty years of exchange work. The center's archives have been acquired by Columbia University's C.V. Starr East Asian Library and are available to researchers by appointment.

== Leadership ==
Chou Wen-chung, a composer whose sensitive melding of East and West led to the emergence of contemporary Chinese music, has had an impact on the development of modern music in Asia and in post-colonial cultures. As a music educator based at Columbia University, he nurtured young composers from around the world and trained the first generation of contemporary composers from mainland China. Simultaneously, Chou devoted the last forty years of his life to an unexpected career as cultural ambassador. In 1978, he established the Center for US-China Arts Exchange at Columbia University, which organized a range of exchanges between arts professionals of the two countries.

Born in Yantai, China in 1923, Chou Wen-chung came to the United States in 1946 and studied composition at the New England Conservatory in Boston with Nicholas Slonimsky. He moved to New York in 1949 and began private lessons with the French-born composer Edgard Varèse, an eccentric and demanding teacher who became his artistic mentor. The same year Chou completed his first composition, "Landscapes," which is today seen by many as the first composition in music history that is independent of either Western or Eastern music grammar. Written for Western instruments, but inspired by Chinese poetry, "Landscapes" was premiered in 1953 by the San Francisco Symphony orchestra conducted by Leopold Stokowski, launching the young immigrant onto a promising career.

Chou revealed his goals of cultural diplomacy in 1978 when he established the Center for US-China Arts Exchange at Columbia University, collaborating with institutions and professionals in both countries on a range of exchange projects. The center's program continued for forty years, and its archives have been acquired by the C.V. Starr East Asian Library at Columbia University. (See History section.)

=== Board of directors ===
==== Founder ====
- Chou Wen-chung: (Director) 1978–2019

==== Columbia University Board of Managers ====
- Michael I. Sovern: (University President) 1983–1993
- George Rupp: (University President) 1993–2002
- Lee Bollinger: (University President) 2002–2018
- Robert Goldberger: (University Provost) 1983–198
- Jonathan R. Cole: (University Provost) 1989–2003
- Alan Brinkley: (University Provost) 2003–2009
- Claude Steel: (University Provost) 2009–2011
- John Coatsworth: (University Provost) 2011–2018
- Schuyler G. Chapin: (Dean, School of the Arts) 1983–1987
- Peter Smith: (Dean, School of the Arts) 1987–1995

=== Advisory Council ===
The Center for US-China Arts Exchange established its first Advisory Council in 1981 and benefited from the guidance of professionals in the arts, academia, business and international cultural exchange. The membership revolved throughout the years and included the following illustrious members:

- Leonard Bernstein (Conductor)
- Miloš Forman (Film director)
- Ming Cho Lee (Set designer)
- Cho-Liang Lin (Violinist)
- Yo-Yo Ma (Cellist)
- Arthur Miller (Playwright)
- I.M. Pei (Architect)
- Isaac Stern (Violinist)
- Audrey Topping (Author and photographer)
- Herman Wouk (Author)
- Yang Chen-ning (Nobel-prize winning physicist)

== Programs ==
The center's programs supported specialists in all the visual, literary and performing arts. At the time of establishment, three programmatic categories were announced: exchanges of materials, exchanges of specialists and clearinghouse services.

=== Exchanges of Materials ===
During China's thirty years of isolation from the west, and most intensively during the Cultural Revolution (1966–1976), both Western art forms and traditional Chinese genres were restricted or banned. Many libraries, publications and artifacts were destroyed. To address the need for arts materials, the Center sought donations from museums, music and art publishers and corporations, and carried music scores, recordings, art publications and literature to conservatories and arts academies. Chinese institutions provided the center with publications about recent developments in China's arts world and the Center assembled these into a resource library on contemporary arts in China.

=== Exchanges of Specialists ===
The core of the center's program was arranging for professional practitioners in the arts, teachers, research scholars, students, and arts administrators to take part in long- and short-term programs. Visitors typically offered lectures and master classes, held discussions with teachers and students, and visited local cultural institutions.

=== Clearinghouse Services ===
The Center provided free consultation and information to China's Ministry of Culture and numerous arts organizations in China, as well as to American individuals, government agencies and organizations designing and carrying out self-funded programs in China on their own.

== Early Programs for Master Artists ==
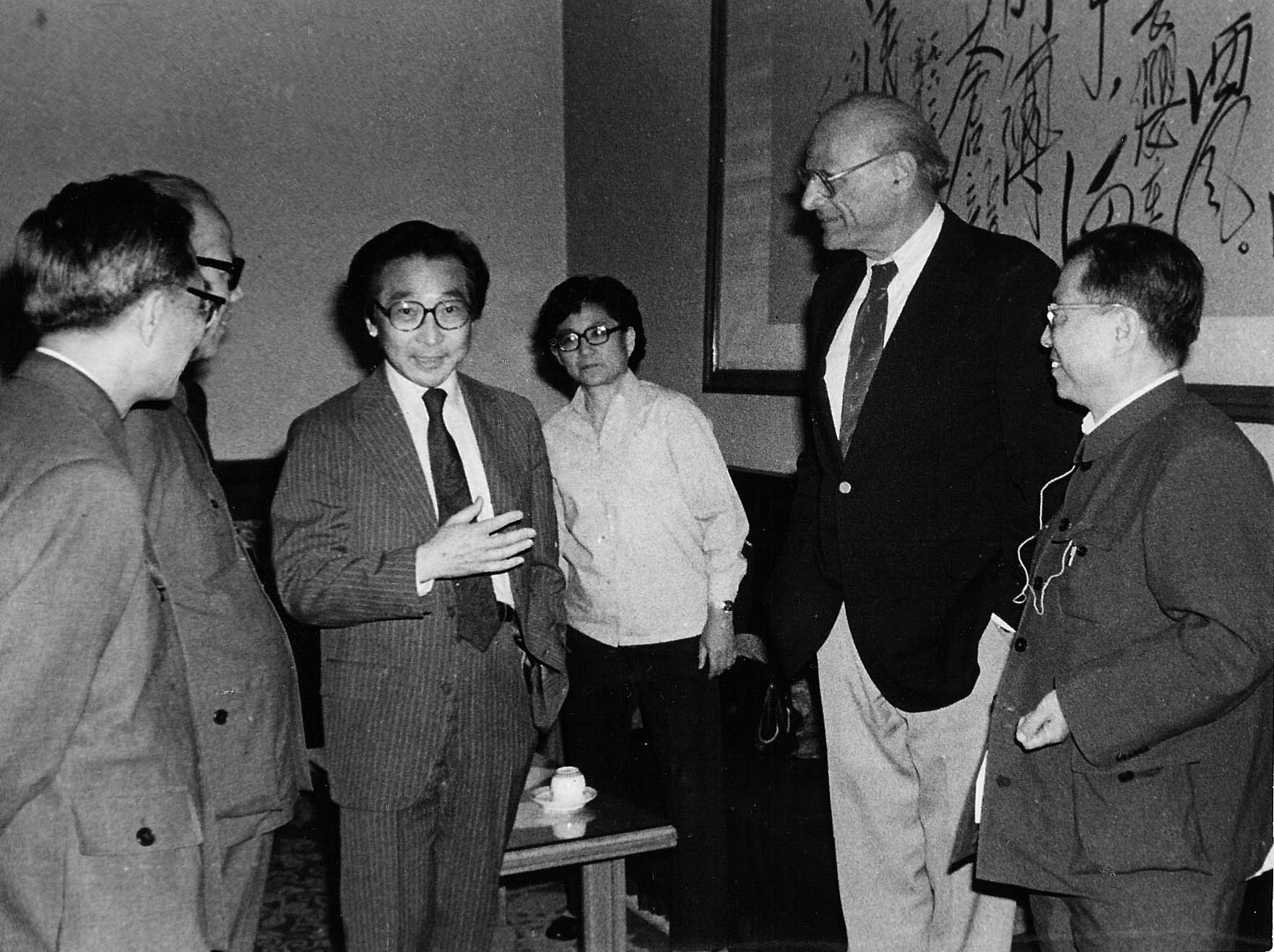
Arthur Miller, Chou Wen-Chung, and Cao Yu at Columbia University, 1980.

In 1979, China's sudden accessibility to American visitors sparked interest in the arts world. Once the opening of the center was announced, the office received requests from both the general public as well as from many distinguished artists and cultural figures who wanted to be among the first to go. At a time when few people were able to make arrangements on their own, the Center took on the role of organizing exchanges in the arts with China.

During the first few years of operation, the Center accommodated many requests from artists who wanted to travel to China. In 1979, violinist Isaac Stern made a performance tour across China with pianist David Golub, and the Center assisted in the production of the award-winning documentary "From Mao to Mozart: Isaac Stern in China." Arthur Miller directed the first Chinese-language production of "Death of a Salesman" with the Beijing Peoples' Arts Theater; and opera star Luciano Pavarotti performed in China for vast audiences—bigger than those for opera performances in the United States. George White of the Eugene O'Neill Theatre Center directed the Chinese-language production of the Broadway show The Music Man; the ballet works of George Balanchine, "Serenade" and "La Valse" were performed by the Central Ballet in Beijing for the first time. These performances and productions reached large audiences in China.

Early visitors included Lincoln Center Chairman Martin Segal, choreographers Anna Sokolow and Alwin Nikolais, literary artist and critic Susan Sontag, sculptor George Segal, trumpeter Ronald K. Anderson, writers Hortense Calisher and Herman Wouk, and set designer Ming Cho Lee. Visitors from China were also often notable, though unfamiliar to most Americans: playwright Cao Yu, actor Ying Ruocheng, writer Ding Ling, qin master Wu Wenguang, costume designer Li Keyu, composers Chen Gang and Mao Yuan, and conductor Chen Xieyang were among the first batch for whom the Center created programs.

== Programming for the Future ==
The center's goal and priority was to initiate long-term and ongoing programs of greater depth that would have lasting results in both China and the U.S. These projects were on the docket in the early days of operations. Several of the ongoing programs are outlined below:

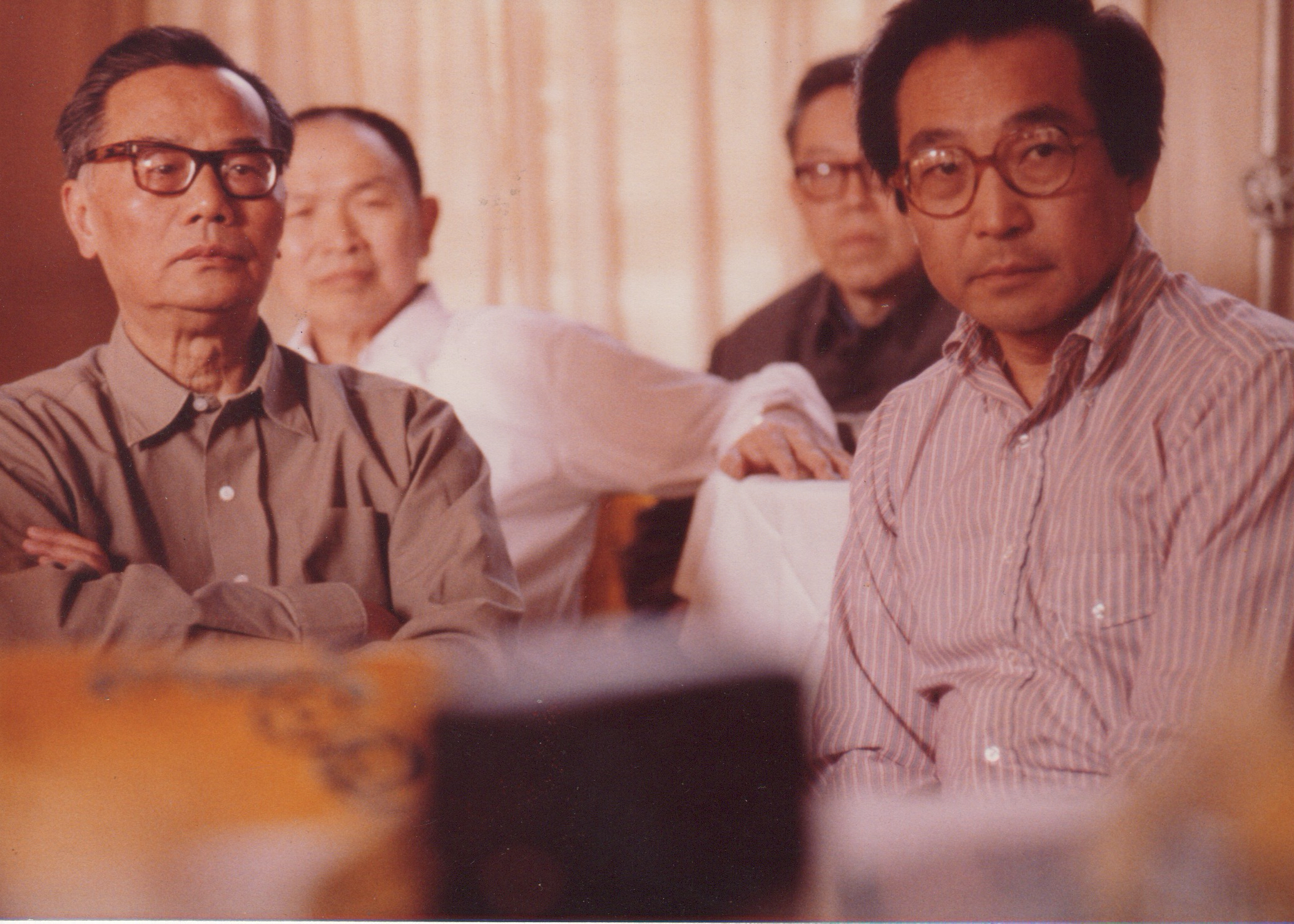
Lin Mohan, Vice Minister of Culture and Chou Wen-chung, Director of the Center for US-China Arts Exchange. Beijing, China. 1980.

=== Arts Education East and West ===
In 1980, Vice Minister of Culture Lin Mohan led a Music and Art Delegation to the U.S. that made the contacts needed to launch a ten-year arts exchange program in arts education that sent teams of art teachers and scholars in both directions. On-site experience was combined with a research project supervised by educational psychologist Howard Gardner and Harvard's Project Zero —a research lab on creativity and leadership. The program led to new research topics among scholars in the United States as well as the creation by the Chinese government of a cabinet-level State Sub-Commission on Arts Education.

=== Music Mends the Rift ===
The rapprochement between the governments of the United States and China did nothing to diminish the animosity between Taiwan and mainland China; artists also reflected this estrangement. To address the rift in the music world, the Center convened a conference at Columbia University in 1988 that brought together composers from both Taiwan and mainland China with composers and music scholars from New York and other parts of the U.S. Ending almost forty years of estrangement, ten composers from mainland China and ten composer from Taiwan discussed issues of mutual interest and concern around the topic of "Tradition and the Future of Chinese Music."

=== Pacific Music Festival ===
In 1990 the Center organized the Pacific Music Festival in Sapporo, Japan. The first event to bring together young musicians and composers from the Pacific rim, the event centered around a youth orchestra of musicians chosen from the countries that border the Pacific Ocean. The Festival was initiated by conductor and music educator Leonard Bernstein, who wanted to establish a Tanglewood-like music performance and education festival and center in East Asia. The youth orchestra performed in Sapporo and in other concert halls in Japan, with Leonard Bernstein at the podium. The London Symphony Orchestra, conducted by Michael Tilson Thomas, shared the stage with the Youth Orchestra. The center's Pacific Composers' Conference, which took place simultaneously, provided the groundwork for a series of workshops for emerging Asian composers.

== Beyond the Urban Centers ==
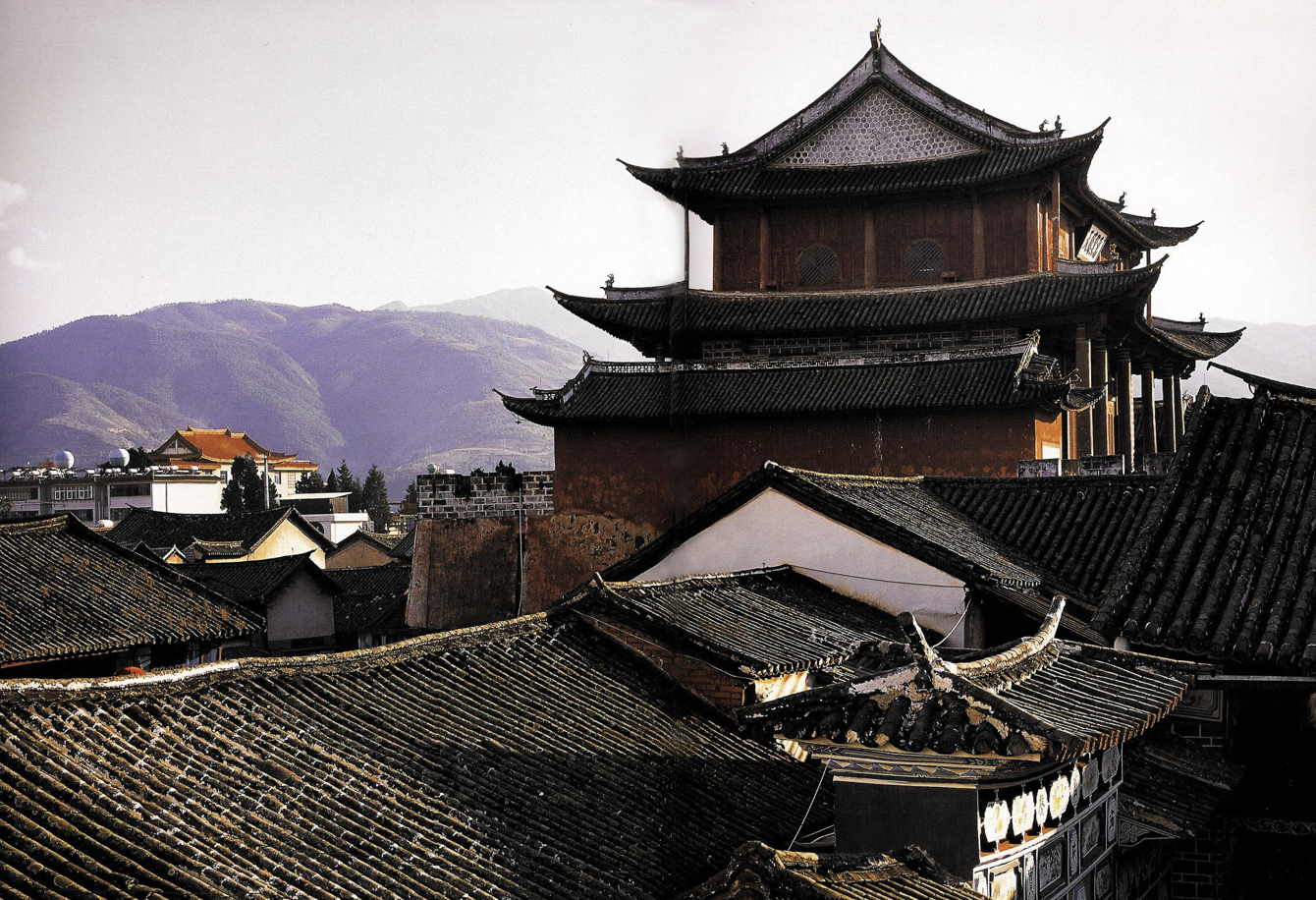
Weishan City, Yunnan province, China. 1991.

During its second decade of programming, the Center expanded its scope beyond the arts of urban centers to include folk genres in rural areas. The new program of cultural conservation focused on the indigenous people of China's southwestern Yunnan Province, which is home to twenty-five ethnic minority groups. (In China, this term is translated into English as "minority nationalities.")

The projects mobilized cultural workers in Yunnan—creating in crafts and traditional forms—as well as provincial scholars of anthropology and related fields. Specialists from Yunnan conducted research in the United States by observing a range of approaches and styles in conservation, education and presentation. They visited institutions dedicated to the culture and arts of diverse minority groups in the U.S., including Native Americans, Latinos and African Americans as well as museums of art, design and natural history in urban areas. American specialists in the fields of museum administration, arts education, archival management, anthropology, archaeology and ethnography visited Yunnan to learn about the cultural realities in China and to share information on existing best practices in the United States.

The efforts of the first five years of this programming (1990–1995) resulted in the establishment of a new ethnography museum in Kunming, called the Yunnan Nationalities Museum, representing the indigenous ethnic groups in the province; the creation of the first indigenous arts department, teaching music, dance and visual arts, at the Yunnan Nationalities University; mentorship programs in rural areas through which mentors in the arts passed on living traditions to young artists; and a research group of young scholars that resulted in the establishment of a "Center for the Studies of the Arts of Minority Nationalities" in the Yunnan Academy of Social Sciences.

The initial experience focused on the need to devote more attention to the component of nature as intrinsic in the artistic and cultural expression of indigenous people. Environmental preservation was then added to that of cultural conservation as a programmatic focus. Representatives from American environmental agencies and institutions such as the Field Museum in Chicago and the School of the Art Institute of Chicago worked in tandem with Chinese ecologists, ornithologists, and amphibian and fungi specialists of agencies including the Gaoligongshan Nature Reserve, Yunnan's Southwest Forestry College and the Kunming Institute of Zoology to spearhead ground-breaking projects where both the environment and cultural lifestyle were jeopardized by modern developments. The projects focused on the regions of Weishan City and Valley and Gaoligongshan. All projects were continued under the sole direction of the participants in Yunnan.

== Publications ==
=== Articles ===
- Arthur Miller Says Chinese Understand his Salesman The Washington Post, May 1, 1983.
- Bernstein and Thomas Head New Pacific Music Festival The New York Times, January 19, 1990.
- Chinese Cast to Perform 'The Music Man' in Beijing The New York Times, March 18, 1987.
- China Gets a Lesson from Beverly Sills The New York Times, August 23, 1981.
- China in International Style The New York Times, July 29, 1982.
- 1,500 Children in 'China Dig' The New York Times, June 4, 1986.
- Isaac Stern's Great Leap Forward Reverberates The New York Times, July 5, 2009.
- Pavarotti On Stage in Peking The New York Times, June 25, 1986.
- Some Zithers from East Asia Played The New York Times, August 12, 1983.

=== Books ===
- Arlin, Mary I and Mark Radice, editors, Polycultural Synthesis in the Music of Chou Wen-chung New York. Routledge, 2018.
- Cai, Jindong and Sheila Melvin, Beethoven in China Australia, Penguin Group, 2015.
- Chang, Peter M., Chou Wen-chung: The Life and Work of a Contemporary Chinese-Born American Composer Lanham, MD. Scarecrow Press, 2006.
- Chou Kwong-chung, Oliver, Performing for the People: A History of the Central Philharmonic Orchestra in the PRC 1956-1996, Hong Kong, Hong Kong University, 2003 (中央樂團是，香港，三聯書店有限公司出版，2009/12出版.)
- Gardner, Howard, To Open Minds: Chinese Clues to the Dilemma of Contemporary Education New York, Basic Books, Inc., Publishers, 1989.
- Jeffri, Joan and Yu Ding, Respect for Art: Visual Arts Administration and Management in China and the United States China, Intellectual Property Publishing House, 2007.
- Lai, Eric C. The Music of Chou Wen-chung Oxfordshire, Ashgate Publishing, 2009.
- Li Cunxin, Mao's Last Dancer New York, The Berkley Publishing Group, 2003.
- Liang, Lei, editor. Confluence: Chou Wen-chung's Writings on Music Shanghai. Shanghai Conservatory of Music Publishing, 2014.
- 梁雷，洛秦，蔡良玉 回流：周文中音樂文集，上海，上海音樂學院出版社，2013.
- Miller, Arthur, Salesman in Beijing New York, The Viking Press, 1984.
- Morath, Inge, Chinese Encounters New York, Farrar, Straus & Giroux, 1984.

=== Articles by Chou Wen-chung ===
- Chou Wen-chung, U.S.-China Arts Exchange: A Practice in Search of a Philosophy. International Institute for Comparative Music Studies and Documentation. Wilhelmshaven, Germany. Published by Florian Noetzel Verlag 1989. Based on speech given in 1988 in Berlin at an international symposium. Speech was titled "Music in the Dialogue of Cultures, Traditional Music and Cultural Policy.
- Chou Wen-chung, Intellectual Climate in China Since the Tiananmen Events, 1995. Published in Center Newsletter, Vol. 11, Fall 1995.

=== Reports by Center for US-China Arts Exchange ===
- Chou Wen-chung, A Report on my Extended Stay in PRC, 1977: Sixteen Days of Marathon Conversations with Musicians and Artists.
- Chou Wen-chung, Background on Chinese Arts Exchange Programs, 1978.
- Chou Wen-chung, Progress Report, July 1979.
- Chou Wen-chung, On China, Briefing on Politics and the Arts (1977-1981), Presentation prepared for Arts Leaders' Delegation, April 1981.
- Profile: Center for US-China Arts Exchange, 1982.
- Program Report (1982-1983). Written November 1983.
- Chou Wen-chung, Current Policies and New Directions: Summer and Fall 1989 (written August 8, 1989).

=== Projects in Yunnan Province ===
- The Weishan Heritage Valley: Recommendations for Preservation and Future Growth (Yunnan Provincial Association for Cultural Exchanges with Foreign Countries, Center for US-China Arts Exchange, Skidmore, Owings & Merrill (SOM) and Openlands Project. Published by Yunnan University Press, 2002.
- Rapid Biological Inventories: 04, China: Yunnan, Southern Gaoligongshan, Chicago, The Field Museum, 2003.
- Weishan-Chinese Old City, book of photographs. (Edited by Fan Jianhua with articles by Chou Wen-chung, Gu Bo-ping, Vincent Michael) Kunming, Yunnan Fine Arts Publishing House, 2006.
- Sustainable Development: Opportunities and Challenges for Yunnan Province, published by the Center for US-China Arts Exchange, 2009.
