= Justin Connolly =

British composer and teacher (1933-2020)

Justin Connolly

Justin Riveagh Connolly (11 August 1933 – 29 September 2020) was a British composer and teacher.

== Life ==
Justin Connolly was born on 11 August 1933 in London. He was the son of John D'Arcy-Dawson, a journalist and author, and his wife Barbara (née Little). He changed his surname from D'Arcy-Dawson to that of his father's biological father in his early 20s.

He was educated at Westminster School, went on to national service in the Army, and briefly studied law at the Middle Temple before deciding on a career in music. From 1958 he studied at the Royal College of Music – composition with Peter Racine Fricker, piano with Lamar Crowson and conducting with Sir Adrian Boult – graduating with a BMus degree. At the same time he had informal contact with Roberto Gerhard. From 1963 to 1965 he attended Yale University on a Harkness Fellowship, where he studied with Mel Powell. He subsequently taught at Yale for 18 months before returning to the UK in 1967. He taught for many years at the Royal College of Music, later moving to the Royal Academy of Music, retiring from teaching in 1995.

Justin Connolly died on 29 September 2020, in London.

== Compositional career ==
His music is published by Novello & Co (Wise Music Group).

Performers of his music have included conductors David Atherton, Pierre Boulez, who premiered one of his orchestra works, Norman Del Mar, Sir Charles Groves, Gustav Meier, Roger Norrington, David Porcelijn, soloists Ronald K. Anderson, Jane Manning, Gillian Weir, Ralph Kirshbaum, Frederick Riddle, Bertram Turetzky, Harry Sparnaay, John Wallace, Susan Bradshaw, Stephen Savage, Nicolas Hodges, Marilyn Nonken, Chisato Kusunoki, as well as the London Symphony Orchestra, BBC Symphony Orchestra, Royal Philharmonic Orchestra, Bournemouth Symphony Orchestra, London Sinfonietta, the Nash Ensemble and the Pierrot Players.

Connolly was highly regarded as a teacher. His students included Catherine Jones, Minna Keal, Jay Alan Yim, Geoffrey King, Andrew McBirnie, Alwynne Pritchard and Kevin Raftery.

== Style ==
Of Connolly's early music, Anthony Payne wrote (in 1971):

Works had been composed in the early 60s and before, often of a Germanic cast, but he was hampered by his very fertility of invention. He could devise a limitless number of continuations at any given point in a composition, and the burden of choice led finally to a psychological and creative cul de sac.

On arrival in the US, Connolly's development was swift, such that Anthony Gilbert (writing in 2012) could describe the premieres of Antiphonies and Poems of Wallace Stevens I in the late 60s both as "electrifying". His subsequent music continues the outwardly modernist idiom, rigorously crafted: glittering, sometimes pointillist, often concerned with the interplay of complex and detailed textures. Some works refer to dance forms, and often a dance-like energy contributes to the forward propulsion (Cinquepaces, Antiphonies, Ceilidh, Canaries); at the same time his music often explores ideas related to philosophy, literature and history, with even non-vocal works sometimes having their roots in poetry (Sestina A and B, Sonatina II: Ennead, Tesserae F). Others yet refer to the composer's strong affinity with the music of the nineteenth century, such as the Tesserae series of works, all based on a hymn-tune by Parry, or his several arrangements of works by Brahms.

Connolly's mature output has been described as "characterized by clear groupings, by massive overall integrity, and by movement upwards, inwards and outwards towards the op. 42 Piano Concerto of 2001-3". He composed works in all genres apart from opera. His purely orchestral works are limited to earlier works (Antiphonies, op. 4, Obbligati for orchestra (1966)), but both incorporate spatialised orchestras. Anthony Gilbert described Antiphonies thus:

The instrumental set-up is reflected in the title, and itself reflects the design of the venue at Norfolk, Connecticut, at which it was to be performed. There are five groups, placed quite separately around the performing area. The outer two are strings, next inwards are respectively woodwind and brass-with-percussion, and the central group mixes wind and percussion. Correspondingly there are five movements whose character in some ways reflects, but does not necessarily engage with, these instrumental contrasts. The antiphonies between the groups within the movements change constantly, throwing a separate group or pair of groups into prominence in each movement, in electrifying manner. Rhythmically free passages combine and alternate with the predominantly strict, precisely-notated music. Overall, the character of the work is that of a dance-concerto; the music has dance-like energy, and the antiphonal nature creates a sense of contest, if not conflict. It could easily be accepted as an early example of the burgeoning movement towards instrumental music theatre, which genre does not of course necessitate a set or even actors - the groups of players could equally perform that function, if optimally placed.

After these works, Connolly's orchestral output concentrated on the dramatic possibilities inherent in the concerto form: Anima written for violist Frederick Riddle, Diaphony for organ and orchestra written for Gillian Weir, and the aforementioned Piano Concerto written for Nicolas Hodges (the result of a BBC commission, premièred in 2003). He also wrote a large concertante work for the London Sinfonietta, Obbligati III, with solo clarinet, trumpet and cor anglais.

Connolly was known for his sensitive and dramatic setting of poetry throughout his output. He composed four cycles to poems by Wallace Stevens, also setting Henry Vaughan, George Seferis, Sappho, Drummond of Hawthornden, Thomas Traherne, Friedrich Hölderlin, and Japanese poetry. Poems of Wallace Stevens II has been described as follows:

Connolly sets the poems almost as drama, creating sometimes quite complex interplays between the forces, and between strict and free notation. In fact, even the 'free' notation is strict in the sense that only the broader rhythmic structures are free; the detail is microscopically defined. Poem 1, Earthy Anecdote, describes how a firecat can terrorize a group of bucks, later simply closing his bright eyes and sleeping. In its symbolism it has a curiously contemporary political relevance. Everything in the piano and clarinet is a response to the words themselves, and to the sharply articulated, almost hyperbolic way the soprano articulates them. This is drama on the edge. After a wild interlude for solo clarinet follows 2, The Place of the Solitaries. Now all is peace, and even greater freedom. The mystical undertones are brought out in the clarinet part, the piano only entering the picture when images of noise and thought are introduced. It then has its own interlude, later joined by clarinet in the chalumeau register, at the commencement of 3, Life is Motion, a song which embodies a concept introduced at the piano's entry-point in the previous song. Here we have metered music, a driving pulse and a feeling of circular motion. Bonnie and Josie, dressed in calico, are dancing round a stump, the erotic symbolism of which is again graphically brought to the fore in the instrumental writing, particularly in the final bar.

Chamber works include a brass quintet Cinquepaces, cycles such as the six Tesserae and six Triads all for different soloists or groupings, as well as solo works such as three Sonatinas for piano solo, and solo works for bass clarinet, flute, viola and cello.

Between 1968 and 1971 Connolly collaborated extensively with Peter Zinovieff at the Putney EMS studio, producing six works. Of these only Tesserae D for trumpet and tape is available for performance. Anthony Payne chose to end his early survey of Connolly's work by describing this corner of his output:

Connolly's use of electronic music [is] important since it develops the noise aspect of his vocal and instrumental writing as well as his interest in the simultaneous use both of different tempos and of different rates of tempo-change. This is another aspect of the fluidity which characterizes all his structures, exemplified elsewhere by his durational systems. In a work like Obbligati II for flute, clarinet, violin, cello, piano and electronics, he can work at a level of complexity almost impossible in wholly instrumental performance. Here the tape tracks prepared with the collaboration of Peter Zinovieff consist of straight and distorted recordings of the four instrumentalists; they produce a complicated flux of opposed tempos as well as a fascinating interplay of noise and sound, echo and re-echo. Connolly's work in this field, which has always involved instruments, is stamped with his characteristic aural sensitivity, and his recent Poems of Wallace Stevens III for soprano, piano and electronics marked his most imaginative use of the medium so far.

He also composed Triad VI for viola, piano and tape, with the collaboration of Lawrence Casserley.

== List of completed works ==
- Sonatina in Five Studies, Op. 1, piano, 1962, rev.1983
- Triad I, Op. 2, tpt, vla, pno, 1964
- Obbligati I, Op. 3, 13 instruments, 1966
- Antiphonies, Op. 4, orchestra, 1966
- Cinquepaces, Op. 5, brass quintet, 1965
- Triad IIa, Op. 6/I, dbass, perc, piano, 1965
- Triad IIb, Op. 6/II, dbass, perc, piano, 1982
- Prose, Op. 7a, SATB, 1967
- Verse, Op. 7b, SSAATTBB, 1969
- Triad III, Op. 8, ob, va, vc, 1966
- Poems of Wallace Stevens I, Op. 9, S, 7 insts, 1967
- M-piriform, Op. 10, S, vln, fl, tape, 1968 (with Peter Zinovieff)
- The Garden of Forking Paths, Op. 11a, piano duet, 1969
- Fourfold, for two pianos, Op. 11b, 1983, from The Garden of Forking Paths
- Triad IV, Op. 12, fl, 2 perc, tape, 1969
- Obbligati II, Op. 13, fl, cl, vln, vcl, piano, tape, 1969 (with Peter Zinovieff)
- Poems of Wallace Stevens II, Op. 14, S, cl, pno, 1970
- Tesserae A, Op. 15/I, ob, hpd, 1968, rev. ob, pno, 1983
- Tesserae B, Op. 15/II, fl, pf, 1970
- Tesserae C, Op. 15/III, cello solo, 1971
- Tesserae D, Op. 15/IV, tpt, tape, 1971
- Tesserae E, Op. 15/V, fl, db, 1972
- Tesserae F, Op. 15/VI, bass clarinet solo, 1999
- Poems of Henry Vaughan, Op. 16, 1&3: SATB. 2: SSATB, 1970
- Rebus, Op. 17, orch., 1971 (lost presumed destroyed)
- Poems of Wallace Stevens III, Op. 18, sop, pno, tape 1971
- Triad V, Op. 19, cl, vln, vc, 1971
- Obbligati III, Op. 20, 20 inst., 1971 (commissioned by the London Sinfonietta, premiere April 14, 1971)
- Triad VI, Op. 21, vla, pf, tape, 1974
- Tetramorph, Op. 22, strings, tape, 1972
- Divisions, Op. 23, wind band, 1972
- Waka, Op. 24, mezzo, pf, 1972, rev. 1981
- Sestina A, Op. 25a, pf, fl, ob, cl, hn, bsn, 1972 (lost)
- Sestina B, Op. 25b, fl, ob, bcl, vln, vc, hpsd, 1972, rev. 1978
- Sonatina No. 2: Ennead, Op. 26, piano, 2000
- Anima, Op. 27, vla, orch, 1974
- Obbligati IV, Op. 28, ensemble, 1974
- Ceilidh, Op. 29/I, 4 vln, 1976
- Celebratio super Ter in lyris Leo, Op. 29/II, 3 vla, accordion, 1994
- Collana, Op. 29/III, vc, 1995
- Celebratio for solo viola, Op. 29/IV, 2005
- Diaphony, Op. 31, organ and orchestra, 1977
- Spelt from Sibyl's Leaves, Op. 32, 5 voices, ensemble (3hn, 2 hp, pno, bgtr, 2perc), 1989
- Nocturnal, Op. 33, fl, pf, cb, perc, 1991
- Sapphic, Op. 35, S, 12 players (fl, ob, bcl, tpt, trb, 2perc, 2 vln, vla, vlc, cb), 1991
- Piano Trio - MK Lives!, Op. 36, 1999 (lost)
- Scardanelli Dreams, Op. 37, MS, pf, 1997-8
- Poems of Wallace Stevens IV, Op. 38, MS, vla, pno, 1992
- Gymel A, Op. 39a, fl, cl, 1993
- Gymel B, Op. 39b, clarinet, cello, 1995
- Remembering the butterfly..., Op. 40a, fl, pf, 1998
- Silbo, Op. 40b, piccolo and piano, 2009
- Piano Concerto, Op. 42, piano and orchestra, 2001-3
- String Trio, Op. 43, 2009–10
- Canaries, Op. 44, wind quintet, 2004
- Sonatina Scherzosa, Op. 45, piano, 2015
- DOG/GOD, Op. 48, for voice and tape, 2017

No opus number:

- Variations, tape, 1968
- Chimaera, dancer, 2 voices, and saxophone quartet, 1979, rev. for dancer, alto, bar., ch., pf., perc., and vc. 1981 (lost)
- Brahms: Variations Op. 23, arranged for wind band, 1985
- MPF – his rebus, for solo piano, 1996
- Scherzetti, solo flute, 2020

== Discography ==
- Poems of Wallace Stevens I / Verse / Cinquepaces / Triad III, Argo LP ZRG 747 (1973)
- Night Thoughts: Sonatina No. 2: Ennead, Nocturnal, Tesserae F: Domination in Black, Scardanelli Dreams. Métier MSVCD 92046 (2001)
- The Solo Trumpet: Tesserae D, John Wallace, trumpet, Soma 781 (1980)
- Jane Manning: Poems of Wallace Stevens II, Jane's Minstrels, NMC D025 (1995)
- Sonatina in Five Studies, Steven Neugarten, piano, Metier MSV CD92008 (1995)
- MK lives! [early version of Piano Trio, op.36], Minna Keal 90th Birthday Concert (private release, 1999)
- Remembering the Butterfly..., op.40, Mark Underwood / Justin Connolly, Piping Hot, Chromattica 0500 (2000)
- Justin Connolly, Lyrita CD SRCD305 (2008)
- Music for Strings (plus), Métier MEX 77209 (2025)

== Bibliography ==
- Anon, Justin Connolly, composer brochure with biography and worklist, Novello and Co. Ltd., January 1992
- Connolly, Justin, "Cardew's 'The Great Digest' and Gilbert's 'Missa Brevis'" Tempo, No. 86 (Autumn, 1968), pp. 16–17
- Connolly, Justin, Review of LPs by Carter, Sessions etc, Tempo No. 105 (June 1973), 40-41
- Connolly, Justin, Havergal Brian review, Tempo No. 167 (August 2000)
- Connolly, Justin, The Songs of Bernard van Dieren, diss., U. of London, 1978
- Connolly, Justin, Preface to Beethoven Symphony no. 6 in F major, op. 68, 'Pastorale', Eulenburg audio+score, 2007
- Connolly, Justin, Preface to Beethoven 9th Symphony, Op. 125, Eulenburg audio+score, 2007
- Connolly, Justin, Preface to Schumann 3rd Symphony, Op. 97, Eulenburg audio+score, 2007
- Connolly, Justin, Preface to Symphony no. 8 D944, 'Great', Eulenburg audio+score, 2007
- Conway, Paul, "London, BBC Maida Vale Studios: Justin Connolly's Piano Concerto" Tempo, Vol. 58, No. 228 (Apr., 2004), pp. 66–67
- Ford, Andrew, Interview with Pierre Boulez, Composer to composer, Hale & Iremonger, 1993, p. 21
- Gilbert, Anthony, "Kaleidoscopes and a labyrinth – the musical vision of Justin Connolly", Tempo, Volume 66, Issue 260 (April 2012), pp. 15–22
- Hodges, Nicolas, "Justin Connolly", New Grove, Second Edition
- Kenyon, Nicholas, The BBC Symphony Orchestra: 1930-1980, London: BBC, 1981, pp370–1 (discussion of circumstances surrounding premiere of Tetramorph)
- Kurowski, Andrew, Justin Connolly in Interview, Tempo, Volume 77, Issue 303, January 2023, pp. 43-57
- McBirnie, Andrew, Obituary of Justin Connolly, The Guardian, 1 November 2020,
- Oliver, Michael, 'Miscellany' in British Music Now, ed. Lewis Foreman (1975), pp. 162–178, esp. pp. 162–164
- Padmore, Susan, Interview with Justin Connolly on Spelt from Sibyl's leaves (BBC Radio 3 broadcast, 1989)
- Payne, Anthony, "Justin Connolly", New Grove (1st edition)
- Payne, Anthony (April 1971). "Justin Connolly". The Musical Times. 112 (1538). Musical Times Publications Ltd.: 335–337. doi:10.2307/955896. JSTOR 955896.
- Potter, Keith and Villars, Chris, "Interview with Justin Connolly". Contact, 1 (1971). pp. 16–20. ISSN 0308-5066.
- Wolf, Benjamin, "The SPNM 1943–1975: a retrospective", The Musical Times, Vol. 154, No. 1925 (WINTER 2013), pp. 47–66
