= Yu Lina =

Chinese violinist (born 1940)

Yu Lina (Chinese: 俞麗拿; pinyin: Yú Lìná; born 1940 in Ningbo, China) is an esteemed and influential Chinese violinist pedagogue in China.

In 1959, in Shanghai, she made her debut as violinist at the nationwide celebration of the 10th anniversary of the founding of China, premiering Butterfly Lovers' Violin Concerto and hence gained great success. In the late 1970s, it gained overwhelming popularity for the second time. Her performance presented the Chinese music to the world as well as introducing the exotic western instrument, violin, to many Chinese people. The album of Butterfly Lovers' Violin Concerto presented by Yu Lina is estimated to have sold over 1 million copies worldwide. She is currently professor of violin at Shanghai Conservatory of Music.

Yu joined the faculty of the Shanghai Conservatory of Music in 1962, where she has taught for more than sixty years. Her students have achieved international recognition and won prizes in major violin competitions, including first prizes at the Paganini Competition (won by Mengla Huang) and the Menuhin Competition (won by Zhijiong Wang).

Yu Lina has made invaluable contributions to the western classical music education in China.

== Family ==
Yu Zhizhai (1875–1962) | Wu Jingzhu (1875–1960)
Yu Xiuqin (1896–1910) | Yu Xiu'ai (b. 1898) m. Ling; Qijun | Yu Xiumei (1900–1930) m. Yao; Kefang | Yu Xiuli (b. 1902) | Yu Puqing (b. 1903) | Yu Xiule (b. c. 1905) m. Liang; Guansong | Yu Xiu'en (1906–1907) | Yu Tianqing (b. c. 1907) m. Yang; Zhen | Yu Tongqing (b. 1911) m. Li; Lushan | Yu Xiujing (b. 1913) m. Xie; Shaowen | Yu Qingqing (b. 1915) | Yu Xiuzhu (1918–c. 1919)
"Hana" (b. 1934) | Liang Linkai (Leung Lam-hoi) | Yu Lina
