= Butterfly Lovers' Violin Concerto =

Chinese orchestral work by He Zhanhao and Chen Gang

The Butterfly Lovers Violin Concerto (Chinese: 梁祝小提琴協奏曲; pinyin: Liáng-Zhù xiǎotíqín xiézòuqǔ (Note: The full name of the work is Chinese: 梁山伯與祝英台小提琴協奏曲; pinyin: Liáng Shānbó yǔ Zhù Yīngtái xiǎotíqín xiézòuqǔ; lit. 'Liang Shanbo and Zhu Yingtai Violin Concerto', which is often abbreviated to be simply Chinese: 梁祝; pinyin: Liáng-Zhù.)) is one of the most famous Chinese works of orchestral music. It is an adaptation of an ancient legend, the Butterfly Lovers, written for Western-style orchestra and solo violin.

This concerto is written using the traditional 5-note technique (pentatonic scale). The piece draws inspiration from Yue Opera for its melodies, chord structures, and patterns, and attempts to imitate the playing techniques of Chinese musical instruments, including the Erhu and Pipa. These elements give the piece a distinctive Chinese sound, although scholars note the concerto still uses Western tonal harmonies and borrows from the Western sonata form.

== History ==
The concerto was written in 1959 by two Chinese composers, He Zhanhao (何占豪, born 1933) and Chen Gang (陳鋼, 1935–2026), while they were students at the Shanghai Conservatory of Music. While Chen was known as a top composer at the conservatory, he had previously worked for a Yue Opera troupe and was familiar with the opera style's conventions. The composition project began as the result of an activity in 1958 at the conservatory, where students were tasked with learning traditional Chinese works in celebration of the tenth anniversary of the People's Republic of China.

He Zhanhao is more widely credited for the composition of the concerto. However, his main contribution was the famous opening theme, while most of the development was written by Chen Gang. This was revealed in an interview of by China Central Television with several artists contributed in the creation and popularity of this work in China and worldwide.

The premiere of the Butterfly Lovers Violin Concerto took place at the Shanghai Music and Dance Festival on May 27, 1959, featuring 18-year-old violinist Yu Lina, as part of the celebration of the tenth anniversary year of the founding of the People's Republic of China. Chen and Yu recount that the inaugural performance enjoyed uproarious applause, which continued even after the composers and performers concluded their performance.

The concerto was banned during the Cultural Revolution, as fellow composers and political figures associated the folktale with anti-Communist themes that exalted the bourgeoisie, further promoting counter-revolutionary messages such as individual liberation and the supremacy of love.

In 1978, the piece resurfaced at the Shanghai Spring festival, thereby signaling a larger revival of the piece in China and beyond. The concerto received widespread acclaim and several gold records throughout the 1980s. Today, the concerto is widely referred to as "our symphony" in China, as the piece blends Western orchestra form with Chinese folklore, musical tradition, and national pride.

The piece was first recorded in 1959 with Yu as soloist and the Symphony Orchestra of Shanghai Music Conservatory conducted by Fan Chengwu, and later by Shen Rong in 1961 with the same orchestra and conductor. The latter recording was re-released in 1977 by China Record Company. A recording of the work with Gil Shaham as the violin soloist that is conducted by Lan Shui leading the Singapore Symphony Orchestra is heard often on radio stations such as WSMR (FM), Sarasota Manatee Classical.

== Story and musical elements ==
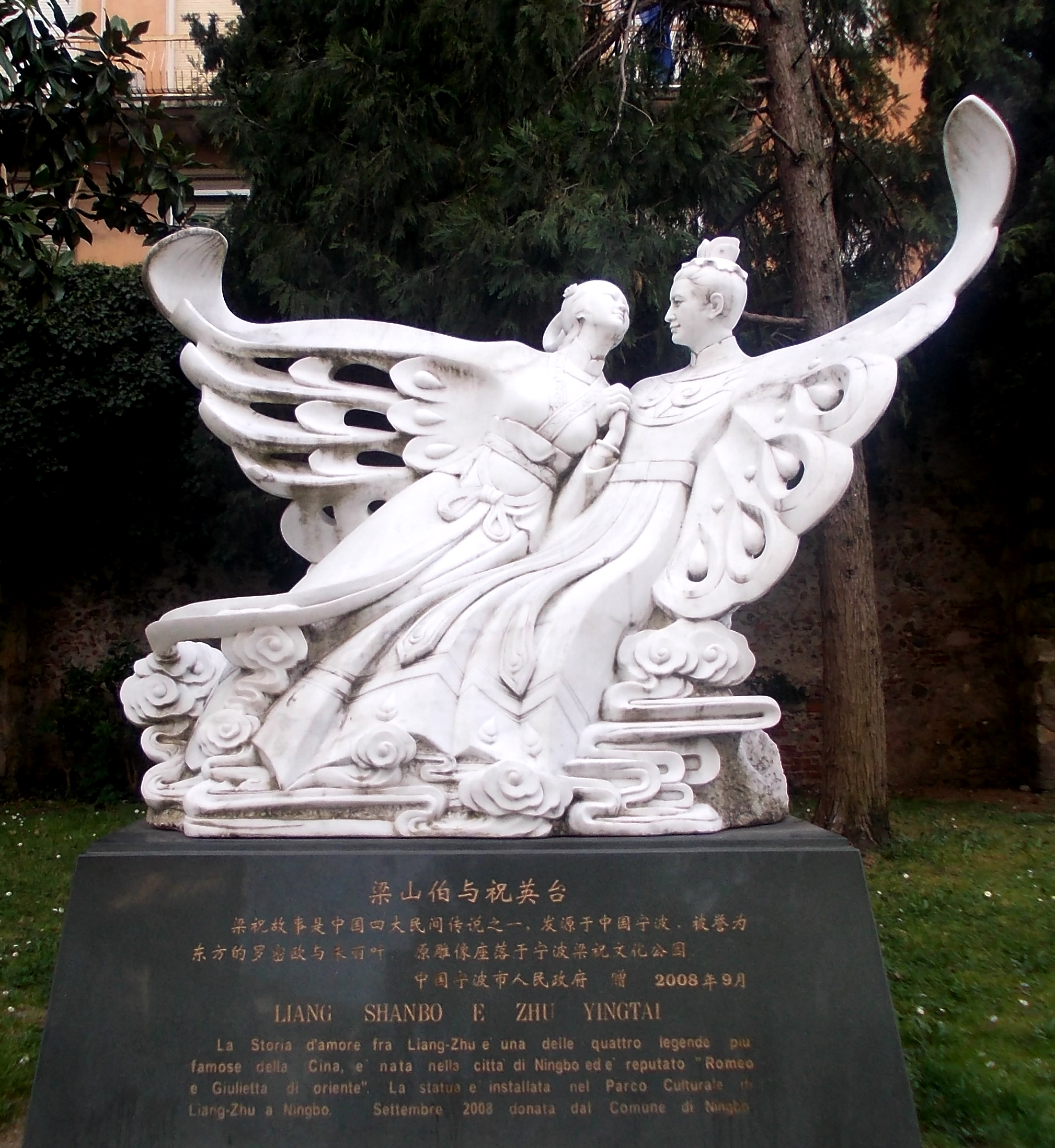
Monument to Liang Shanbo and Zhu Yingtai near the Tombe di Giulietta in Verona, Italy

The concerto is in one movement, but is broken into seven distinct sections. Each tells a different part of the story of the Butterfly Lovers. Some of the melodies come from the Chinese Opera of the same name or from traditional Chinese folk songs. The solo violin of the concerto is symbolic of Zhu Yingtai, the story's protagonist, and the cello part is symbolic of Liang Shanbo, her lover.

=== I. Adagio Cantabile ===
The concerto begins with two-fifths in D by the harp, after which a solo flute opens with a flowery melody, setting the scene of the story. A solo oboe enters with the strings in G major, after which the solo violinist enters and begins a simple melody. This melody comes from a Chinese folk song of the Yellow River (Huanghe), and tells the story of Zhu Yingtai's childhood. The solo violin is accompanied by a harp and other elements of the orchestra. On the road to Hangzhou for her studies, Zhu (disguised as a man) meets Liang for the first time; a cello solo intertwines with the violin, bringing a new, but still melodious theme and modulating to D major. As the cello exits, the orchestral tutti plays the same melody of the solo violin, with occasional violin entrances in between. As the first buds of love begin to blossom, a short violin cadenza using mostly the G-pentatonic scale expresses Zhu's joy of her and Liang's oath of fraternity.

=== II. Allegro ===
The orchestra begins the next section in E major, the violin entering with a fast and jovial melody, representing Zhu and Liang's busy three years of school. Many examples of violin technique are represented, namely spiccato, fast playing over a wide range of notes, and even arpeggios, in a standard display of difficulty for a violin concerto.

=== III. Adagio assai doloroso ===
As the end of their schooling draws near, Liang and Zhu grow sad as they realize that their time together is nearly over. Zhu invites Liang to visit her family and to court her sister. He doesn't know that Zhu is really inviting him to marry her. Liang promises to see Zhu again, but Liang waits before doing so.

=== IV. Pesante – Piu mosso – Duramente ===
When Zhu returns home, she finds that her father has promised her to the son of a rich family. The solo violin struggles against the forces of the orchestra, representing her protests against her father.

=== V. Lagrimoso ===
When Liang arrives, he sees Zhu and realizes that she is a woman, and they fall in love. The solo violin and cello solo play an emotional duet, one of the most famous and powerful sections of the work.

=== VI. Presto resoluto ===
The love duet between the two is replaced by anger as Liang learns that in his absence, Zhu has been betrothed to another. The solo violin launches into a brilliant and difficult passage, supported by chords from the orchestra, but eventually returns to the original melody representing love, accompanied again by the cello solo. Liang becomes sick and dies as the duet draws to a close. Another virtuosic section for the solo and orchestra combines both the slow melodies and the fast energetic passages introduced before. The section ends with the suicide of Zhu as the solo violin ends with an abrupt high note.

=== VII. Adagio cantabile ===
The lovers' parts are united by a final section, with the solo violin and the orchestra redeveloping the opening theme to build to a triumphant climax. The concerto ends bittersweetly with a final melodic phrase from the solo violin, concluding mysteriously on a high D from the strings. In the legend, Liang's grave opens and Zhu throws herself into the chasm; the ending portraying the lovers' transformation into butterflies, never to be separated again.

== Instrumentation ==
This concerto is composed for violin, two flutes, two oboes, two clarinets in A, two bassoons, two horns, two trumpets, two trombones, timpani, percussion (gu ban, cymbal, tam-tam), harp, piano, and strings. The piece is now often performed with Chinese instruments playing the violin part, the most common being erhu, pipa, and liuqin; in such cases, the soloist is often accompanied by an orchestra consisting of Chinese instruments.

This piece has also been adapted into other forms, including a piano concerto by Chen Gang and a piano solo by Sun Yilin (孙亦林, January 3, 1935 – April 5, 2015).
