= Ronald K. Anderson =

American trumpeter

Ronald K. Anderson (August 19, 1934, Kansas City, MO - September 5, 2023, Shushan, NY) was an American trumpeter and teacher.

== Life ==
Anderson performed after World War II as part of the Seventh Army Symphony Orchestra. Later he was a founding member of the American Brass Quintet, remaining during the period 1962 to 1965, as well as of The Group for Contemporary Music.

He taught at Purchase College, New York University, Stony Brook University, and Bennington College.

== Repertoire ==
As well as his activities with the American Brass Quintet and The Group for Contemporary Music, Anderson commissioned or premiered many contemporary works for solo trumpet, by composers including Charles Dodge (Extensions for trumpet and tape), Ralph Shapey, Stefan Wolpe (Solo Piece for Trumpet (1966) and Piece for Trumpet and Seven Instruments (1971)), Charles Wuorinen Nature's Concord (1969) for trumpet and piano). and Justin Connolly (Tesserae D (1971), for trumpet and tape).

Anderson worked frequently with the BBC while on tour in Europe. Broadcasts included a duo recital with the pianist Susan Bradshaw, of works by Hindemith, Honegger and Maxwell Davies, as well as recordings of works by Justin Connolly and Charles Dodge.

In 1982 he travelled to China under the auspices of the Center for US-China Arts Exchange at Columbia University, teaching and presenting commissioned solo works such as the Connolly Tesserae D.

== Discography ==
Vivian Fine: Quartet For Brass (1978) on CRI SD 434 (LP) and CRI CD CRI CD 692 (CD) for more see Page at Discogs

== Sources ==
- Anon., Newsletter of the Center for US-China Arts Exchange, Columbia University, Spring 1982, Vol. 3 No. 1 link
- ed. Clarkson, Austin On the Music of Stefan Wolpe - Essays and Recollections, 2003, Pendragon Press
- Hughes, Allen "Music: Piano, Trumpet Works in Avant-Garde Series", New York Times, May 19, 1974, p. 56
