= Chou Wen-chung =

Chinese American composer (1923–2019)

- 周文中
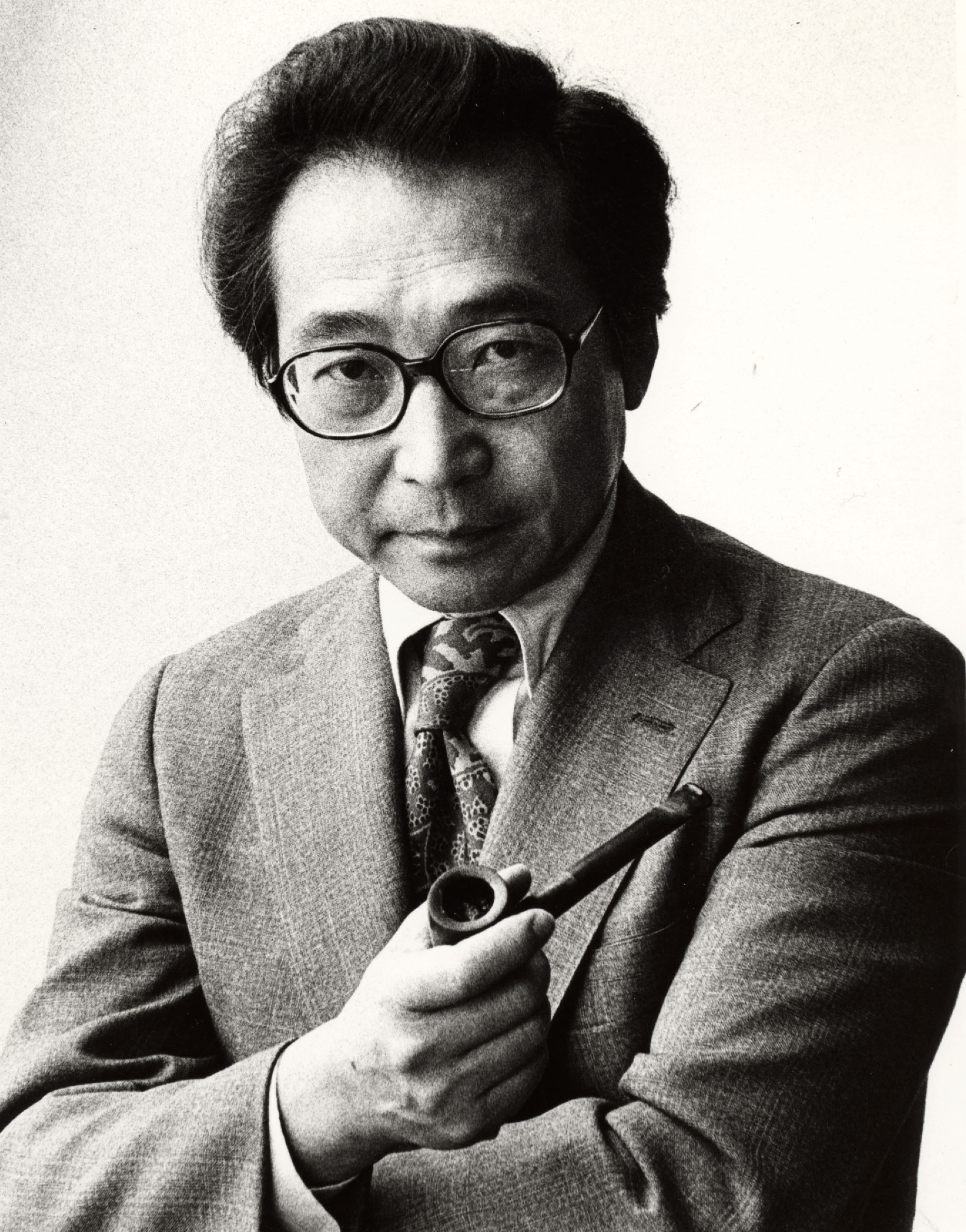
- Born: 28 July 1923; Yantai, Shandong, China
- Died: 25 October 2019 (aged 96); New York, New York, U.S.
- Citizenship: United States (from 1958)
- Spouse: Chang Yi-an (m. 1962–2016)

Academic background
- Education: National Chunking University (BS); New England Conservatory of Music (BA); Columbia University (MA)

Academic work
- Institutions: Columbia University; Center for US-China Arts Exchange; Hunter College
- Notable students: Zhou Long; Chen Yi; Tan Dun; Chinary Ung; David Froom; Ge Gan-ru; Bright Sheng; James Tenney; Jing Jing Luo; Michael Rosenzweig; Faye-Ellen Silverman; Jacques-Louis Monod

Chinese name
- Traditional Chinese: 周文中
- Simplified Chinese: 周文中
Transcriptions
Standard Mandarin
- Hanyu Pinyin: Zhōu Wénzhōng

Chou Wen-chung (Chinese: 周文中; pinyin: Zhōu Wénzhōng; July 28, 1923 – October 25, 2019) was a Chinese American composer of contemporary classical music. He emigrated in 1946 to the United States and received his music training at the New England Conservatory and Columbia University. Chou is credited by Nicolas Slonimsky as one of the first Chinese composers who attempted to translate authentic East Asian melo-rhythms into the terms of modern Western music.

== Life ==
=== Early years in China ===
Chou was born in Yantai (Chefoo), Shandong. He grew up in China and developed an early love for music. ("Sights and Sounds" is an essay by Chou on early influences on his music.) Qin music, in particular, has proved fertile ground for his future exploration. Chou described his early explorations of musical instruments:

While in Qingdao, I first discovered the meaning of music in life when I heard our household help enjoying their free time by playing instruments, singing, and drinking. I also became fascinated with harmonium pedals, which I played with at first as a car accelerator, and then discovered their dynamic effect... However, it was in Wuhan that I discovered the violin when my older brothers and I bought a child-size violin as a toy. My oldest brother, Wen-tsing, immediately began taking lessons and recruited me as his "student"! I played the erhu, studied the violin and taught myself a medley of instruments, such as mandolin, harmonica and musical saw.

During the Second World War, he was persuaded to study civil engineering to help modernize China. After high school, Chou studied Architecture at Saint John's University, Shanghai in China. Chou stated in his biography, "I chose architecture as a compromise between art and science, largely influenced by John Ruskin's comment on architecture as 'frozen music.'" Within one semester, Chou's study was interrupted because of the breakout of World War II and Chou had to relocate and continued his study in Guangxi University and Chongqing University. Chou attended Guangxi University during 1942–44 and managed to find time to compose music on his own and to educate himself about Western culture through reading library books despite the nightly air raids and the demands of his studies in civil engineering. Due to the vicissitudes of war, Chou had to move again in 1944 and continued his study in Chongqing University where he received his B.S. degree in civil engineering.

=== Turning point – Music study and teaching in the United States ===
In 1946, Chou turned down a scholarship in architecture at Yale University in order to pursue music, studying with Nicolas Slonimsky at the New England Conservatory and with Edgard Varèse and Otto Luening in New York. In a conversation with Frank J. Oteri published on NewMusicBox in 2013, Chou described the difficulties he had at that time:

For more than a week, I stayed in my room. I couldn't make up my mind whether I really wanted to continue with this scholarship. Can you believe it? The only way I could come to this country was to get a scholarship to Yale and register as a student. So I went to see the dean, saying I had decided not to [continue]. Having [later] been a dean myself, I know how he felt. But I felt I had no choice. That shows you another important thing about being an artist. If you have conviction in your art, you have to be daring. You don't care what critics or what other artists would say. You are going to do it. You have to understand the risk I took. I was given a tremendous scholarship. I didn't have any other money. I couldn't survive. Besides I would have a problem with the American government, the immigration office, since my visa was based on going to Yale. But I never thought of those questions. I took a train back to Boston where my brother lived, and I thought he would really throw me out, or send me back to China. But no. He picked up a letter and said, "This is your father's letter. Read it." I opened it. It was my father's handwriting. I know Wen-chung really wants to be a composer, to study music. If he has to, let him.

Chou studied composition with Otto Luening at Columbia University and from 1949–1954, took lessons privately with Edgard Varèse who became a lifelong mentor and friend.

Synthesizing western and eastern sounds has been a pursuit of Chou's throughout his life. During his early compositional years in New York, one experience changed Chou's perspective on how to incorporate different cultural elements. Peter Chang described this incident in details:

On one occasion, Chou showed his Chinese-flavored fugues to Bohuslav Martinů, who started to read them on the piano and suddenly stopped after a few measures. He looked at Chou and simply uttered one word: "Why?" Chou could not answer. Such an embarrassment disturbed him profoundly and made him realize that substituting pentatonic for heptatonic modes in fugue, which had been developed in the heptatonic and triadic tradition, was like putting Chinese words into Bach's mouth. Fugue was Bach's natural language, but not his. Chou believed that this was one of the greatest lessons he ever had because, beginning with the word "why," he had to satisfy his own questions before moving on.

After that experience and through encouragement from Slonimsky, Chou decided not to seek the artificial combination of Chinese melody and western harmony but instead to study Chinese music and culture seriously. Chou's encounter with Western culture helped him see and appreciate his own culture in new light. To re-learn and to interpret his own tradition, in 1955, Chou spent two years researching classical Chinese music and drama with a grant from the Rockefeller Foundation. He became a naturalized citizen of the U.S. in 1958.

Slonimsky commented on how Chou successfully fused two seemingly incompatible musical materials and wrote: When pentatonic melodies of the Orient are harmonized in this conventional manner, the incompatibility between the melody and the harmonic setting is such that the very essence of Oriental melody is destroyed. Even more difficult is the representation of microtonal intervals peculiar to some countries of the Orient .. Chou Wen-Chung is possibly the first Chinese composer who has attempted to translate authentic oriental melo-rhythms into the terms of modern Western music... He addressed the problem of conciliation between melodic pentatonicism and dissonance.

== Academic career ==
In 1954, he became the first technical assistant at Columbia's Electronic Music Laboratory and was concurrently appointed director of a research project on Chinese music and drama. This research reinforced his own aesthetic convictions and led him to synthesize theories of calligraphy, qin, single tones and I Ching, all of which represented new ground in his compositional thinking. As chairman of the Music Division at Columbia University, he was instrumental in providing its composition program with a clear sense of artistic vision. Chou also distinguished himself as vice-dean of the School of the Arts and director of the Fritz Reiner Center for Contemporary Music at Columbia University. His notable students include Zhou Long, Chen Yi, Tan Dun, Chinary Ung, David Froom, Ge Gan-ru, Bright Sheng, James Tenney, Talib Rasul Hakim, Jing Jing Luo, Michael Rosenzweig, Faye-Ellen Silverman, Jacques-Louis Monod, and Hsiung-Zee Wong. See: List of music students by teacher: C to F#Wen-chung Chou.

== Career as cultural ambassador ==
In 1978, Chou Wen-chung established the Center for US-China Arts Exchange at Columbia University to promote mutual understanding between the two countries through the channel of culture. It was the first organization to address the need to re-connect leaders in the arts in China and the United States after diplomatic ties had been severed for thirty years. The Center organized exchanges in both directions. Distinguished artists including violinist Isaac Stern, playwright Arthur Miller, writer Susan Sontag and choreographer Alwin Nikolais visited China while prominent cultural figures from China such as playwright Cao Yu and actor Ying Ruocheng visited the U.S. Among the many projects was a six-year ongoing program in arts education led by Howard Gardner of Project Zero at Harvard University. In the 1990s the Center's purview expanded to include programs focused on the arts of ethnic nationalities in Yunnan province and relevant issues of environmental preservation.

== Music career ==
As a protégé of the composer Edgard Varèse, Chou chose not to simply to propagate Varèsian concepts in his music, but to move beyond his teacher's shadow. From Varèse's purely Western perspectives, Chou's music represented cross-cultural pollination, by integrating the East and the West with a requisite understanding of both cultures. He can be regarded as the founder of the contemporary Chinese musical idiom, one whose music sets the standard and an example for succeeding generations to emulate.

Chou's revolutionary insights brought about a broader and more integrated perception of Chinese music by scholars and laymen from East and West. He recognized the intrinsic contribution of qin music and the single tone concept to Chinese music, and more importantly, he recognized their value to composers. ("The Twain Meet" by Leighton Kerner.) Also important to his music was a focus on refining individual pitches. He believed the West has mastered formal structures, whereas the East has focused on controlling subtle inflections of tones. By emulating Western achievement in formal design, he employed these nuances not as mere decoration, but as a clear structural element. The art of calligraphy, in its various levels of meaning, serves constantly as the music's philosophical underpinning. A controlled spontaneity and quiet intensity derived from an intimate knowledge of his art and his culture, together with a growth process as organic and inevitable as that of nature, remain requisite stylistic elements. Ultimately, he sought not so much to amalgamate the divergent Eastern and Western traditions as to internalize and transcend contemporary idioms and techniques to create an intimately personal style that reflects a genuine, modern sensibility. ("Chou Wen-chung" by Nicolas Slonimsky)

Chou wrote for a variety of media. His works have been performed by the orchestras of Chicago, Philadelphia, New York, San Francisco, Berlin, Paris, and Tokyo. He received grants from the Rockefeller, Guggenheim and Koussevitsky Foundations, from the National Institute of the Arts and Letters, the National Endowment for the Arts, and the New York State Council on the Arts. He was the Fritz Reiner Professor Emeritus of Musical Composition at Columbia University (where he was also Director of the Center for US-China Arts Exchange), and a member of the American Academy and Institute of Arts and Letters.

Chou was composer-in-residence at Tanglewood, Bennington and the University of Illinois. His posts in music organizations included the presidency of Composers Recordings, Inc. (CRI) and the chair of the Editorial Board of Asian Music. He was also an honorary life member of the Asian Composers League. Other contemporary music organizations with which he was affiliated included League ISCM, the Yaddo Corporation, the American Composers Alliance, the American Music Center, and the American Society of University Composers.

Chou Wen-chung was a member of the American Academy of Arts and Letters and in 2001, he was named Officier des Ordre des Arts et des Lettres by the French Ministry of Culture. In 2018, the Xinghai Conservatory of Music in Guangzhou opened the Chou Wen-chung Music Research Center to carry on the composer's legacy and initiate projects in support of contemporary music. He was awarded an honorary doctorate from the New England Conservatory in 2019.

== Composition styles and developments ==
=== Early period ===
Chou's early works share common characteristics such as the use of Chinese poetry as inspiration and the direct quotation of Chinese melodies. Representative compositions from this period are Landscapes (1949), All in the Spring Wind (1952–1953), And the Fallen Petals (1954), and Willow Are New (1957).

Chou quoted a traditional folk song Fengyang Flower Drum in Landscapes and this orchestral piece is inspired by poems that evoke the scenery and atmosphere of a Chinese landscape painting. These poems "Under the Cliff, in the Bay," "The Sorrow of Parting" and "One Streak of Dying Light" are used as subtitles to indicate the moods of different sections in Landscape.

Chinese scholars traditionally inscribe poetry in a painting and many of Chou's early compositions have inscriptions from ancient Chinese poems. Chinese poetry served as inspiration for And the Fallen Petals, and All in the Spring Wind. Both works are based on a Southern Tang dynasty poem titled “Yi Jiangnan – Reminiscence of Southern Territories” by Li Yu. Peter Chang commented that through these early works, Chou developed a mode of musical thinking in terms of Chinese visual and literary artistic principles such as the emphasis on the control of ink flow in calligraphy, brevity in landscape paintings, poetry in musical form, and pictorial depiction of the qin playing gestures.

=== Mature period ===
In this period, Chou's inspirational source came from the philosophical book, the I Ching (Book of Changes), the contents of which he said represent "the germinal elements of all that happens in the universe, including natural phenomena, human affairs, and ideas." Based on the yin and yang concepts presented in I Ching, Chou created variable modes – a system of interval contents and pitch contents that correspond to the trigrams and hexagrams in I Ching. Chou applied and experimented with the principles of the I-Ching in harmonic, thematic, textural, and rhythmic structures.

Beginning in the late 1950s, Chou began to experiment with variable modes in his compositions. Jianjun He classified Chou's works into two categories: "pentatonic-related" or "variable modes-based" composition. Most of Chou's early works are pentatonic-related and Chou drew his inspirations from traditional Chinese pentatonic melodies. The piece metaphor (1960) marks the beginning of Chou's middle period when Chou utilized the variable modes as a compositional method to pitch organization. Later, Chou applied the modes to other works such as Cursive (1963), Pien (1966), and Yun (1969). Chou stated that the structure of Pien is based on the concept of balance between the positive and the negative forces as stated in I-Ching.

Ideogram is another evolutionary concept Chou experimented with while attempting to synthesize western and eastern elements and render Chinese sounds through western instruments. Chou is an accomplished calligrapher and after years of practicing the various styles and scripts of Chinese calligraphic writings, Chou began to see the parallels in the art of calligraphy and music. Chou wrote, "The cursive script represents the essence in the art of Chinese calligraphy as its expressiveness depends solely upon the spontaneous but controlled flow of ink which, through the brush – strokes, projects not only fluid lines in interaction but also density, texture and poise.... These qualities, translated into musical terms are often found in the music for wind and string instruments of the east." Chou compares the ink flow to the density of the music and experimented with the ideograms of cursive style writing in the piece Cursive in 1963.

Chou's later works moved toward abstraction and he further developed the variable mode to make it more flexible. Some notable compositions are Beijing in the Mist (1986), Echoes from the Gorge (1996), Windswept Peaks (1994), Concerto for Violoncello and Orchestra (1991), and Clouds (1998).

Chou wrote his second string quartet, Streams (2003) in response to Bach's Art of Fugue, which was commissioned by the Brentano String Quartet. In 2007, the gayageum master, Yi Ji-young, commissioned him to write a work for gayageum and an ensemble of traditional Korean instruments. Her group, Contemporary Music Ensemble of Korea (CMEK) premiered Eternal Pine in 2008. Chou wrote a version for western instruments, Ode to Eternal Pine (2009), for the New York New Music Ensemble (NYNME) and a version for traditional Chinese instruments, Sizhu Eternal Pine (2012; his first and only work for a full ensemble of Chinese instruments), for the Taipei Chinese Orchestra.

== Personal life ==
Chou Wen-chung was born into a literati family with ancestral roots in the ancient cultural center of Changzhou in Jiangsu province. His older brother, Wen Tsing Chow pioneered the use of digital computers in missile, satellite and spacecraft guidance systems for the United States Air Force and NASA.

Chou Wen-chung married Chang Yi-an (born Shanghai in 1927, died April 12, 2016) in 1962. They had two sons.

== Sources ==
- Chou Wen-Chung: the life and work of a contemporary Chinese-born American composer, Rowman & Littlefield, 2006, ISBN 978-0-8108-5296-9
