= Ge Gan-ru =

Chinese composer

Ge Gan-ru (Chinese: 葛甘孺; born July 8, 1954) is a Chinese composer of contemporary classical music.

== Biography ==
Ge Gan-ru was born in Shanghai, China. His early years were spent in the Chongming Island during the Cultural Revolution. In 1974, he was originally enrolled by the Shanghai Conservatory, majoring in violin. In the third year, he switched to composition major.

Ge Gan-ru's personal composing style was developed during the years back in Shanghai. In 1983, his first representable work Yi Feng (The Lost Style) came out being commissioned by Frank Huang, who was still a student major in cello that year. Yi Feng, though arranged for solo cellist, has a chamber-like character. The strings are retuned a tri-tone lower than regular pitch and the body of cello is considered as four separated parts. The composer requires the soloist to play on those four parts in order to create percussive timbres. The premiere took place in the same year by Huang. Its avant-generation aesthetic caused a burst of discussion nationwide.

Also in 1983, Ge Gan-ru was recommended by Chou Wen-chung to Columbia University for his doctorate in composition. His work has been performed by The New York Philharmonic, BBC Orchestra, Royal Scottish National Orchestra, Lyon National Orchestra, Tokyo Philharmonic, American Composers Orchestra, Hong Kong Philharmonic, Shanghai Symphony Orchestra, Shanghai Philharmonic, Chamber Music Society of Lincoln Center, the Kronos Quartet, Shanghai Quartet, Miami Quartet and many other ensembles. The copyright of his oeuvre are all kept by himself. The New Grove Dictionary of Music and Musicians describe him as 'China's first avant-garde composer'.

== List of major works ==
=== Chamber ===
- String Quartet No. 1, Fu (赋, Prose Poem)
- String Quartet No. 2
- String Quartet No. 3
- String Quartet No. 4, Angel Suite
- String Quartet No. 5, The Fall of Baghdad (巴格达的沦陷)
- Four Peking Opera Studies, for piano and string quartet
- Wrong! Wrong! Wrong! (错！错！错！), for toy piano etc.
- Hard! Hard! Hard! (难！难！难！), for toy piano etc.
- Yi Feng (遗风, The Lost Style), for cellist
- Gu Yue (古乐, The Ancient Music), for pianist
- Duration Instant (时值瞬间), for pianist

=== Orchestral ===
- Six Pentatonic Tunes (六首五声片段)
- Chinese Rhapsody (中国狂想曲)
- Shanghai Reminiscences (上海回忆录)
- Fairy Lady Meng Jiang (孟姜女)
- Loves Besieged (霸王别姬)
- Butterfly Overture, dedicated to teacher Chen Gang (蝴蝶序曲，献给我的老师陈钢)

=== Concertos ===
- Wu, for piano and orchestra (兀，钢琴协奏曲)
- Yi Feng II, for cello and orchestra (遗风II，大提琴协奏曲) [Destroyed by Composer]
