= Chen Yi (composer) =

Chinese-American composer (born 1953)

- 陈怡
- Born: April 4, 1953 (age 73); Guangzhou, China
- Education: Central Conservatory of Music; Columbia University
- Occupations: Composer; Violinist

Chen Yi (simplified Chinese: 陈怡; traditional Chinese: 陳怡; pinyin: Chén Yí) (born April 4, 1953) is a Chinese-American composer of contemporary classical music and violinist. Chen Yi has earned global fame as a prolific composer who integrates Chinese and Western traditions, transcending cultural and musical boundaries. She was the first Chinese woman to receive a Master of Arts (M.A.) in music composition from the Central Conservatory of Music in Beijing. Chen was a finalist for the 2006 Pulitzer Prize for Music for her composition Si Ji (Four Seasons), and has received awards from the Koussevitzky Music Foundation and American Academy of Arts and Letters (Lieberson Award), as well as fellowships from the Guggenheim Foundation and the National Endowment for the Arts. In 2010, she was awarded an Honorary Doctorate from The New School and in 2012, she was awarded the Brock Commission from the American Choral Directors Association. She was elected to the American Academy of Arts and Letters in 2019.

== Early life ==
Born to parents who are both doctors and enthusiasts of Western classical music and culture, Chen Yi and her two siblings began music lessons at age three. She began learning piano and at age four was introduced to violin. She memorized works by classical composers like Mozart, Bach, Beethoven, and Tchaikovsky and was able to sing their compositions note for note. At age 13, she was already an accomplished violinist.

During the Cultural Revolution, Chen and her siblings' studies were interrupted as they were taken to a work camp in the countryside. She continued to play the violin, but was only allowed to perform "revolutionary songs". At age 17, she returned to her hometown Guangzhou and became the concertmaster and composer of the Peking Opera in Beijing. In 1978, Chen was admitted to the Central Conservatory of Music where she received a bachelor's and master's degree. In addition, she spent summers studying Chinese folk music and considers this research as an important part of her musical development.

== Career ==
Chen lived in New York City for many years and studied composition at Columbia University, earning a DMA with distinction. From 1993 to 1996, she served as Composer in Residence in the Women's Philharmonic. In 1996, Chen made history as the first woman in the United States to present a full evening of multimedia concert with her symphonic and choral works in San Francisco for a whole evening. Her teachers included Wu Zu-qiang in Beijing as well as Chou Wen-chung and Mario Davidovsky in New York. Since 1998, Chen has been the Lorena Cravens/Millsap/Missouri Distinguished Professor at the University of Missouri–Kansas City Conservatory of Music and Dance. Previously, she was on faculty at the Peabody Institute in Baltimore, Maryland. She is married to composer Zhou Long, a fellow alumnus of the Central Conservatory of Music in Beijing and fellow professor at the University of Missouri-Kansas City.

Alongside a great number of orchestral works, Chen has also made many contributions to the choral and chamber music repertoires, including works written for traditional Chinese instruments. Chen's works are published by the Theodore Presser Company.

== Works ==
=== Solo ===
- Ba Ban, for piano (1999)
- Bamboo Dance, for solo piano (2014)
- Duo Ye, for piano (2000)
- Guessing, for piano (2000)
- Ji-Dong-Nuo, for piano (2007)
- Jing Marimba, for solo marimba (2010)
- Memory, for solo cello (2011)
- Memory, for solo flute (2011)
- Memory, for solo violin (2011)
- Monologue (Impressions on 'The True Story Of Ah Q'), for unaccompanied alto saxophone (2000)
- Monologue (Impressions on 'The True Story of Ah Q'), for unaccompanied B-flat clarinet (2000)
- Northern Scenes, for solo piano (2015)
- Percussion Concerto, percussion with piano (1998)
- Points, for solo pipa (1991)
- Shuo Chang, for solo guitar (2014)
- Singing in the Mountain, for piano (2005)
- Totem Poles, for organ (2020)
- Two Chinese Bagatelles, piano solo for children (2000)
- Variations on "Awariguli", for piano solo (2011)

=== Chamber ensemble (2 performers) ===
- Ancient Dances, for pipa and percussion (2005)
- Bright Moonlight, for voice and piano (2004)
- China West Suite, for two pianos (2007)
- China West Suite, for marimba and piano (2008)
- Chinese Ancient Dances, for B-flat clarinet and piano (2004)
- Chinese Ancient Dances, for soprano saxophone and piano (2006)
- Eight Visions, a new anthology for flute and piano (2009)
- Fisherman's Song, for violin and piano (1999)
- From Old Peking Folklore, for violin and piano (2009)
- The Golden Flute, solo flute with piano reduction (1999)
- Happy Tune (III. Dou Duo from 'Three Bagatelles'), for two cellos
- Meditation, two songs for voice and piano (2006)
- Nian Hua, for two guitars (2017)
- Ox Tail Dance (No. 1 from Chinese Ancient Dances), for horn and piano (2006)
- Romance and Dance, for violin and piano (2001)
- Romance of Hsiao and Ch'In, for cello and piano (2001)
- Seven Muses, a contemporary anthology for flute and piano (1986)
- The Soulful and The Perpetual, for alto saxophone and piano (2013)
- Three Bagatelles from China West, duet for flute and piano (2006)
- Three Bagatelles from China West, for B-flat (or E-flat) clarinet and piano (2009)
- Three Bagatelles from China West, for flute and guitar
- Three Bagatelles from China West, for contrabass and piano
- Three Bagatelles from China West, for violin and cello
- Three Bagatelles from China West, for flute and B-flat clarinet
- Three Bagatelles, for guanzi and sheng

=== Chamber ensemble (3 or more performers) ===
- As in a Dream, for violin, cello, and soprano
- As in a Dream, for soprano, pipa, and zheng
- As Like A Raging Fire, for flute, clarinet, violin, cello, and piano
- At the Kansas City Chinese New Year Concert, for string quartet
- Blue Dragon Sword Dance (from "At the Kansas City Chinese New Year Concert"), for string quartet
- Burning, for string quartet (2004)
- Chinese Fables, for erhu, pipa, cello, and percussion
- Eleanor's Gift, for cello, percussion, and piano
- Feng, for woodwind quintet
- Fiddle Suite, for huqin and string quartet
- Fire, for twelve players
- From the Path of Beauty, for string quartet
- The Han Figurines, for violin, B-flat clarinet, B-flat tenor saxophone, double bass, piano, and percussion
- Happy Rain On A Spring Night, for flute, clarinet, violin, cello, and piano
- Joy of the Reunion, for oboe, violin, viola, and double bass
- Near Distance, for chamber ensemble
- Night Thoughts, for flute, cello, and piano (2004)
- Ning, for violin, cello, and pipa
- Not Alone, for SATB saxophone quartet (2017)
- Qi, for flute, cello, percussion, and piano
- Septet, for erhu, pipa, percussion, and saxophone quartet
- Shuo, for string quartet
- Song In Winter, for di, zheng, and harpsichord
- Song In Winter, for flute, zheng, piano, and percussion
- Sound of the Five, for solo cello and string quartet
- Sparkle (Octet), for flute (doubling piccolo), E-flat clarinet, two percussionists, piano, violin, cello and double bass
- Suite for Cello and Chamber Winds
- Three Dances from China South, for dizi, erhu, pipa, and zheng
- Tibetan Tunes, for piano trio (2008)
- Tunes From My Home, trio for violin, cello, and piano
- Woodwind Quintet
- Woodwind Quintet No. 3 (Suite From China West for Woodwind Quintet)
- Wu Yu, for flute, clarinet, bassoon, percussion, violin, and cello
- Wu Yu, for flute, clarinet, oboe, violin, viola, violoncello, and contrabass
- Xian Shi, for viola, piano, and percussion
- YangKo, for solo violin and two percussionists

=== Vocal/Choral ===
- Angel Island Passages, for children's choir and string quartet
- Arirang, for a cappella SATB chorus (1999)
- The Bronze Taotie (Movement 1 From "From The Path Of Beauty"), for mixed chorus
- Capriccio, for SATB chorus, solo percussion, and organ
- Chinese Mountain Songs, for a cappella treble chorus (2002)
- Chinese Poems, for SSAA chorus (2000)
- Distance Can't Keep Us Two Apart, for a capella SATB chorus (2012)
- From the Path of Beauty, for SATB chorus and string quartet
- A Horseherd's Mountain Song (From "Two Chinese Folk Songs"), for a cappella SATB chorus (2006)
- I Hear The Siren's Call, for a cappella SATB chorus (2013)
- Know You How Many Petals Falling?, for a cappella SATB chorus (2003)
- Landscape, for a cappella SATB chorus (2004)
- Let's Reach A New Height, for a cappella SATB chorus (2013)
- Looking At The Sea, for a cappella SSA chorus
- Sakura, Sakura, for a cappella SATBB chorus (1999)
- A Set Of Chinese Folk Songs, for men's chorus
- A Set Of Chinese Folk Songs (Volume 1), for SATB chorus and optional piano (1994)
- A Set Of Chinese Folk Songs (Volume 2), for SATB chorus and optional piano (1994)
- A Set Of Chinese Folk Songs (Volume 3), for SATB chorus and optional piano (1998)
- Shady Grove, for a cappella SATB chorus (2004)
- A Single Bamboo Can Easily Bend (From "Two Chinese Folk Songs"), for a cappella SATB chorus (2006)
- Spring Dreams, for a cappella SSAATTBB chorus (1999)
- Spring Rain, for a cappella SATB chorus (2011)
- Tang Poems, for a cappella male choir
- To The New Millennium, for soprano solo, mezzo-soprano solo, and a cappella SATB chorus (2002)
- Two Chinese Folk Songs (1. The Flowing Stream, 2. The Sun Is Rising With Our Joy), for SSAATTBB chorus
- The West Lake, for a cappella SATB chorus (2004)
- With Flowers Blooming, for a cappella SSA chorus (2011)
- Written On A Rainy Night (From Tang Poems), for a cappella SATB chorus (1995)
- Written On A Rainy Night, for a cappella men's chorus
- Xuan, for a cappella SATB chorus (2002)

=== Chorus and ensemble ===
- Chinese Myths Cantata
- Early Spring, for mixed choir and chamber ensemble
- From the Path of Beauty, for mixed choir and string quartet
- KC Capriccio, for wind ensemble and mixed chorus
- A Set of Chinese Folk Songs, for children's SA(T) chorus and strings
- Tang Poems Cantata, for SATB chorus and chamber orchestra

=== Orchestra ===
- Blue, Blue Sky, large orchestra (2012)
- Caramoor's Summer, chamber orchestra (2014)
- Celebration, large orchestra (2014)
- Duo Ye, chamber orchestra (1985)
- Duo Ye No. 2, full orchestra (1987)
- Faith and Perseverance, large orchestra
- Fountains Of KC, large orchestra (2011)
- Ge Xu (Antiphony), large orchestra (2014)
- Introduction, Andante, and Allegro (2018), full orchestra
- Jing Diao, large orchestra (2011)
- The Linear, large orchestra (1994)
- Momentum, large orchestra (1998)
- Mount a Long Wind, large orchestra (2010)
- Overture, youth orchestra (2008)
- Prelude and Fugue, chamber orchestra (2009)
- Prospect Overture, large orchestra (2008)
- Rhyme of Fire, large orchestra (2008)
- Shuo, string orchestra (1994)
- Si Ji (Four Seasons), large orchestra (2005)
- Sprout, string orchestra (1986)
- Symphony No. 4 'Humen 1839', large orchestra (2009)
- Symphony No. 2, large orchestra (1993)
- Symphony No. 3, large orchestra (2003–04)
- Tone Poem, chamber orchestra
- Tu, for orchestra

=== Orchestra with soloist(s) ===
- The Ancient Beauty
- The Ancient Chinese Beauty, for recorders and string orchestra
- Ba Yin (The Eight Sounds), for saxophone quartet and string orchestra
- Ballad, Dance and Fantasy, for cello and orchestra
- Chinese Folk Dance Suite, for violin and orchestra
- Chinese Rap, for violin and orchestra
- Concerto for Reeds, for oboe, sheng, and chamber orchestra
- Dunhuang Fantasy, concerto for organ and chamber wind ensemble
- Eleanor's Gift, for solo cello and orchestra
- Fiddle Suite, for huqin and orchestra
- Fiddle Suite, for huqin and string orchestra
- Four Spirits, concerto for piano and orchestra
- The Golden Flute, concerto for flute and orchestra
- Percussion Concerto, for solo percussion and orchestra
- Piano Concerto
- Romance and Dance, for two solo violins and string orchestra
- Romance of Hsiao and Ch'in (First Movement of "Romance and Dance"), for two violins and string orchestra
- Southern Scenes, a double concerto for flute, pipa, and orchestra
- Spring in Dresden, for violin and orchestra
- Suite for Cello and Chamber Winds
- Xian Shi, for viola and orchestra

=== Band/Wind ensemble ===
- Ba Yin (The Eight Sounds), for saxophone quartet and wind ensemble
- Dragon Rhyme, for symphonic band
- Spring Festival, for symphonic band
- Suite From China West, for wind ensemble
- Tu, for wind ensemble
- Wind, for wind ensemble

== See also ==
- Down to the Countryside Movement
