= Bright Sheng =

Chinese-American composer, conductor, and pianist

Bright Sheng (Chinese: 盛宗亮; pinyin: Shèng Zōngliàng; born December 6, 1955) is a Chinese and American composer, pianist and conductor. Sheng has earned many honors for his music and compositions, including a MacArthur Fellowship in 2001; he also was a two-time Pulitzer Prize finalist. His music has been commissioned and performed by virtually every major American symphony orchestra, in addition to the Orchestre de Paris, Royal Concertgebouw Orchestra, Toronto Symphony Orchestra, BBC Symphony Orchestra, London Sinfonietta, St. Petersburg Philharmonic Orchestra, Russian National Orchestra, Finnish Radio Symphony Orchestra, Sydney Symphony Orchestra, National Symphony Orchestra of Taiwan, Shanghai Philharmonic Orchestra, Tokyo Philharmonic Orchestra, and the Seoul Philharmonic Orchestra among numerous others. His music has been performed by such musicians as the conductors Leonard Bernstein, Kurt Masur, Christoph Eschenbach, Charles Dutoit, Michael Tilson Thomas, Leonard Slatkin, Gerard Schwarz, David Robertson, David Zinman, Neeme Järvi, Robert Spano, Hugh Wolff; the cellists Yo-Yo Ma, Lynn Harrell, and Alisa Weilerstein; the pianists Emanuel Ax, Yefim Bronfman, and Peter Serkin; the violinists Gil Shaham and Cho-Liang Lin; and the percussionist Evelyn Glennie.

Born in Shanghai, he first studied the piano at the age of four with his mother. He graduated from the Shanghai Conservatory and went on to continue his education at Queens College and Columbia University. In 1995, he became a part of the faculty at the University of Michigan.

Most of Sheng's musical career has followed the path of mixing Western cultures and Asian cultures into his pieces, leading his music to be performed in both Asia and the United States, as well as around the world.

== Early life and education ==
Bright Sheng was born in Shanghai, China on December 6, 1955. His mother had been his first piano teacher, having started learning at the age of four. When the Cultural Revolution began, his home's piano was taken away by the Red Guards. Sheng went back to playing a year later, using his school's since he didn't have one at home. Shortly thereafter, he decided to play piano for the rest of his life, although he didn't believe that he could become a musician since his family had no history of music.

Sheng was sent to Qinghai Province, China, and stayed there for seven years. He became a performer, playing the piano and percussion to not only perform, but to study and collect folk music. He also began to compose his own music.

Because Sheng had to teach himself how to play musical instruments and learn music theory to play, Qinghai folk music became and continues to be a strong inspiration in his compositions today. He used Tibetan folk music from Qinghai as a basis for his opera The Song of Majnun.

After the end of the Cultural Revolution, he got admitted into the Shanghai Conservatory of Music where he learned both Chinese classical and traditional music. There, Sheng earned his Bachelor of Arts degree in music composition.

Sheng left China in 1982 and joined his family in the United States, where he had to re-learn different elements of music to adjust to the Western style of music. In New York, he attended Queens College to earn his Master of Arts degree in 1984 and Columbia University to earn his Doctor of Musical Arts degree in 1993. Some of his teachers included George Perle and Hugo Weisgall at Queens College and Chou Wen-chung, Jack Beeson, and Mario Davidovsky at Columbia University, as well as Leonard Bernstein.

== Career ==
Sheng served as a composer-in-residence for the Lyric Opera of Chicago from 1989 to 1992, the Seattle Symphony from 1992 to 1995, and as an artistic director for the Wet Ink Festival hosted by the San Francisco Symphony Orchestra in 1993. He also taught at the University of Washington for a year. He joined the composition department at the University of Michigan in 1995, as associate professor of music. He taught future conductor Kenneth Lampl classical composition at Tanglewood in 1998, and in 2003 he was appointed the Leonard Bernstein Distinguished University Professor.

He was involved in the Silk Road Project, a music project that stretches across different nations and cultures. It was named after the silk trade because the Silk Road is the oldest trade route between ancient Rome and China. To prepare, he went on a field research trip along the Silk Road regions in China, tracing their musical culture to collect folk songs and historical materials. Sheng had also wanted to write a research article to document the composition, gain the help from a graduate student, as well as lecturing on American music.

In October 2021, Sheng stepped down from teaching an undergraduate class, where he says he had intended to show how Giuseppe Verdi adapted William Shakespeare's play Othello into his opera Otello. On September 10, 2021, he showed the class John Dexter's Othello, where Laurence Olivier played Othello in blackface. Sheng allegedly failed to give students any warning that the film contained blackface. Evan Chambers, a fellow professor of composition, said "To show the film now, especially without substantial framing, content advisory and a focus on its inherent racism is in itself a racist act, regardless of the professor's intentions", and David Gier, dean of the School of Music, Theatre & Dance, said that Sheng's actions "do not align with our School's commitment to anti-racist action, diversity, equity and inclusion". But according to Robert Soave of Reason, the university had violated the principle of academic freedom and showing the movie was neither a racist act nor approval of racism. Soave said that the "broader university community" owed Sheng an apology for slandering him, and compared the treatment Sheng received to his earlier experience of surviving the Cultural Revolution.

== Musical style ==
At the beginning of his musical career, Sheng started out by making simplistic pieces of Chinese-Western mixtures since he had been exposed early on to both traditional Chinese music and ‘mainstream’ Western music. As his career continued, he found ways to incorporate traditional Chinese methods of music with modern music from Western influences. For nearly his whole composing career, Sheng has represented the Chinese culture he came from with the Western culture he moved to. As a result, Sheng's following has expanded from Asia and the United States to a global one.

His first opera, The Song of Majnun, was written in 1992 and looked at the tensions among the styles of Chinese, Tibetan, and European music. It was based on an Islamic story but used Tibetan folk melodies.

H’un (‘Lacerations’), Sheng's composition for orchestra, was written as a remembrance of the Cultural Revolution. The piece premiered in 1988 and was performed by the New York Chamber Symphony.

Sheng's method of incorporating Chinese and Western methods together has been criticized and questioned. Even he himself had concerns about whether the two musical elements could be put together in a meaningful way. Some of the teachers he had advised him not to mix the two forms and to do one or another.

It wasn't until speaking with his mentor Leonard Bernstein, who supported his methods to mix the two musical elements, that Sheng believed his way of composing music has become, in a way, a "new language".

While still young in China, Sheng studied the history that made up Chinese music in three forms: classical, folk, and theatrical. He also looked at the history of Western music, closely studying the musical styles of Johann Sebastian Bach and Ludwig van Beethoven, as well as the music of other composers and his teachers.

The Hungarian composer Béla Bartók is one of Sheng's greatest influences. Sheng believes that his music fits within two of the ways Bartók believed folk music can be used in composition: imitating the melody in the folkloric style and writing not deliberately in the style of folk music but with its flavor.

In 1996, Sheng traveled back to his home country of China after fourteen years to compose Spring Dreams, commissioned by Yo-Yo Ma. While there, he got accustomed again to the instruments used in China and Chinese musical thinking.

Sheng admits that his creative process is not constant. Inspiration can come after hearing a couple of notes on the television programs, researching for his next pieces, or dreaming about the music.

== Honors ==
Sheng's honors include the John Simon Guggenheim Fellowship (1990), the Walter W. Naumburg Foundation Award (1990), the Rockefeller Award (1991), the MacArthur Foundation Fellowships (2001), MacDowell Colony Fellowships (1985, 1988), a Kennedy Center Award (1995), and an ASCAP Concert Music Award (2002).

His orchestral composition H’un (‘Lacerations’), which premiered with the New York Chamber Symphony in 1988 and was a memorial to the Cultural Revolution in China, was awarded the first runner-up for the 1989 Pulitzer Prize. Two years later in 1991, his piece Four Movements for Piano Trio was also awarded first runner-up for the Pulitzer Prize.

== Works ==
=== Operas ===
- The Song of Majnun (1992)
- The Silver River (1997)
- Madame Mao (2003)
- Dream of the Red Chamber (2016)

=== Instrumental ===
Composition	Instrument	Year
3 Etudes	Flute	1982
3 Pieces	Violin, piano	1986
H'un ['Lacerations']	Orchestra	1988
My Song	Piano	1989
4 Movements	Piano trio	1990
The Stream Flows	Violin	1990
Concertino	Clarinet, string quartet	1993
String Quartet No. 3	String quartet	1993
7 Short Yadhtrib Variations	Bassoon	1994
China Dreams	Orchestra	1995
7 Tunes Heard in China	Cello	1995
Spring Dreams	Cello, Chinese Orchestra	1997
Spring Dreams	Violin, Chinese Orchestra	1998
2 Poems	Chinese Orchestra	1998
Flute Moon	Solo Flute, Harp, Piano, Percussion, Strings	1999
Red Silk Dance	Piano, Orchestra	1999
3 Songs	Pipa, Voice	1999
Nanking! Nanking!	Pipa, Orchestra	2000
String Quartet No. 4 "Silent Temple"	String quartet	2000
Distant Birthday Bells	Piano	2001
Tibetan Dance	Clarinet, violin, piano	2001
Tibetan Swing	Orchestra	2002
The Song and Dance of Tears	Violin, voice, pipa, sheng, orchestra	2003
Sweet May Again	String bass, piano	2007
Northern Lights	Cello, piano	2009
Hot Pepper	Violin, marimba	2010
Melodies of a Flute	Flute/alto flute, violin, cello, marimba, suspended cymbals	2011

=== Vocal ===
- Three Chinese Poems (1982-1992) for piano
- Three Poems from the Sung Dynasty (1985) for soprano, orchestra
  - Revised as Two Poems from the Sung Dynasty
- Three Chinese Love Songs (1988) for soprano, viola, piano
- Two Folk Songs from Qinghai (1989) for chorus, orchestra
- may I feel, said he 'Opera in 7 minutes' (1996) for soprano, tenor, four-handed piano
- Phoenix (2004) for soprano, orchestra
