= Jing Jing Luo =

Chinese composer (born 1953)

- Born: 1953 (age 72–73); Beijing, China
- Occupation: Composer

Jing Jing Luo (simplified Chinese: 罗京京; traditional Chinese: 羅京京; pinyin: Luó Jīngjīng; born 1953) is a Chinese composer.

== Early life and training ==
Jing was born in Beijing. She received an undergraduate degree at the Shanghai Conservatory of Music, where she majored in piano performance and composition and studied with Chen Gang and Sang Tong. She earned postgraduate degrees from the New England Conservatory and the State University of New York at Stony Brook.

Luo's fellowships have come from the Asian Council on the Arts, the New York Foundation for the Arts, and the Ford and Rockefeller foundations. Her work has been distributed and published by Subito Music Corporation.

In 2014, Luo was included in a concert sponsored by the League of American Orchestras that wished to pair emerging composers with orchestral opportunities.

== Teaching career ==
Luo has taught composition at Ashland University (1991-2001), Nazareth College (2002-2003), and the Oberlin Conservatory of Music (2002-2004).

== Selected honors and awards ==
Luo has won the following honors and awards:

- Rockefeller Foundation at Bellagio Conference Center (composer residency, 2011).
- Koussevitzky Music Foundation (2006)
- International Composers Competition for Orchestra Works with the Winnipeg Symphony Orchestra in Canada (3rd prize, 2001).
- ASCAP awards (1994-2011)
- Ohio Arts Council (Individual Artist Fellowships, 1991-1998)
- Music From China International Composers (Traditional Chinese Instruments Competition, 1999)
- Chinese Overseas Composer Competition (3rd prize, “No Home to Return,” 1996)
- American Academy of Arts and Letters, Walter Hinrichsen Award (“The Spell,” 1996)
- Dale Warland Singer’s Reading competition (1st prize, "Chinese Requiem,” 1995)
- Fanny Mendelssohn International Women Composers Competition (3rd prize, 1993)
