= Chen Gang (composer) =

Chinese composer (1935–2026)

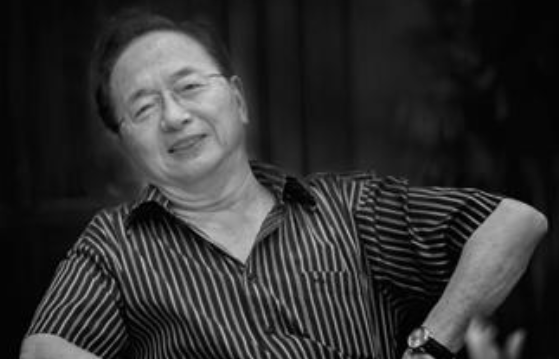
Chen in 2018

Chen Gang (Chinese: 陳鋼; pinyin: Chén Gāng; 10 March 1935 – 18 July 2026) was a Chinese composer best known for his work Butterfly Lovers' Violin Concerto. He was the son of songwriter Chen Gexin. Chen Gang started to learn piano and composition from his father and music teachers from a young age.

== Life and career ==
From 1955 to 1959, Chen Gang was a student at the Shanghai Conservatory of Music, studying composition. In 1959, Chen Gang, together with another student, He Zhanhao, composed the violin concerto Butterfly Lovers.

The violin concerto won five Golden Record prizes as well as a Platinum Record prize. The Concerto has also achieved enormous international success. Chen was a professor at the Shanghai Conservatory of Music.

In his composition career, he composed and recomposed many classics in China, including Butterfly Lovers, Miaolin's Morning, and The Golden Steel Smelting Furnace. He also composed a virtuoso violin solo piece: Sunshine in Tashkurgan, which is frequently performed in China.

Chen died on 18 July 2026, at the age of 91.

== Notable students ==
- Jing Jing Luo (b. 1953)
