= Chinese musical notation =

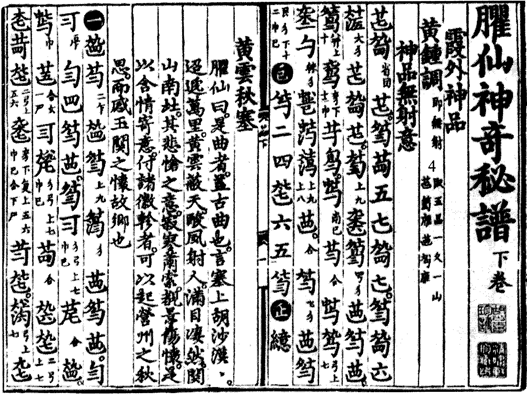
Chinese Guqin notation, 1425

Systems of musical notation have been in use in China for over two thousand years. Different systems have been used to record music for bells and for the Guqin stringed instrument. More recently a system of numbered notes (Jianpu) has been used, with resemblances to Western notations.

== Ancient ==
The earliest known examples of text referring to music in China are inscriptions on musical instruments found in the Tomb of Marquis Yi of Zeng (d. 433 B.C.). Sets of 41 chime stones and 65 bells bore lengthy inscriptions concerning pitches, scales, and transposition. The bells still sound the pitches that their inscriptions refer to. Although no notated musical compositions were found, the inscriptions indicate that the system was sufficiently advanced to allow for musical notation. Two systems of pitch nomenclature existed, one for relative pitch and one for absolute pitch. For relative pitch, a solmization system was used.

== Guqin notations ==
The earliest music notation discovered is a piece of guqin music named Jieshi Diao Youlan (碣石調·幽蘭) during the 6th or 7th century. The notation is named "Wenzi Pu", meaning "written notation".

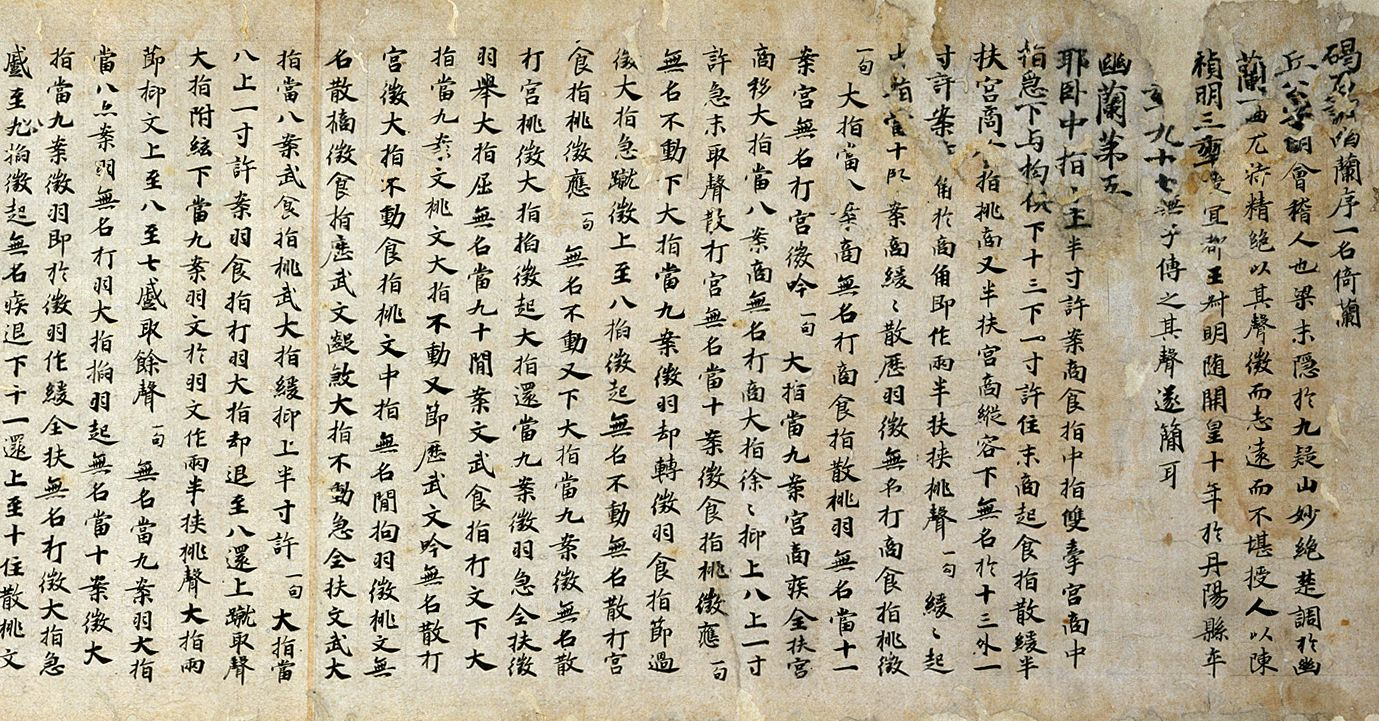
The Tang manuscript, Jieshidiao Youlan (碣石調·幽蘭)

The tablature of the guqin is unique and complex. The older form is composed of written words describing how to play a melody step-by-step using the plain language of the time, i.e. descriptive notation (Classical Chinese). The early pieces of music are all written by words to explicitly explain the fingerings. Later on, to simplify the method of recording, "Jianzi Pu", which means "abbreviated character" notation, is invented in the late Tang dynasty by Cao Rou (曹柔), a famous Guqin player.

This newer form of guqin notation is composed of bits of Chinese characters put together to indicate the method of play is called prescriptive notation. Rhythm is only vaguely indicated in terms of phrasing. It is used to record fingering actions and string orders, without recording the pitch and tempo, thus make the piece look simpler and give more flexibility to guqin players.

Tabulatures for the qin are collected in what is called qinpu.

== Gongche notation ==
Gongche notation, dating from the Tang dynasty, used Chinese characters for the names of the scale.

Octave positions are sometimes shown by the addition of an affix or small mark. A chromatic scale could be produced from this by the use of the prefixes gao- (high) to raise a note, or xia- (low) to lower it, by a semitone; but after the 11th century, gao- ceased to be used.

Traditionally, the Gongche notation was written vertically from right to left, but horizontally is also accepted nowadays.

Additionally, this system was also introduced to Korea, aka gong jeok bo in ancient music, and also Kunkunshi, a Ryukyuan musical notation still in use for sanshin.

== Jianpu (numbered musical notation) ==
The Jianpu system uses numbers to notate music. It is common in East Asia, including Myanmar (Burma), Japan, Mainland China and Taiwan.

The notation was invented by Enlightenment thinker Jean-Jacques Rousseau in 1742. It had gained widespread acceptance by 1900. It uses a movable do system, with the scale degrees 1, 2, 3, 4, 5, 6, 7 standing for do, re, mi, fa, sol, la, si, while rests are shown as a 0. Dots above or below a numeral indicate the octave of the note it represents. Key signatures, barlines, and time signatures are also employed. Many symbols from Western standard notation, such as bar lines, time signatures, accidentals, tie and slur, and the expression markings are also used. The number of dashes following a numeral represents the number of crotchets (quarter notes) by which the note extends.

Note	C	D	E	F	G	A	B
Solfege	do	re	mi	fa	sol	la	si
Number	1	2	3	4	5	6	7

The table above shows how the numbers represent the note respectively. The Jianpu uses dots above or below the number to show its octave. They also represent the number of octaves. For example, a dot below the number "6" is an octave lower than "6". It also uses dashes (–) to represent the note length.
