= Wild Geese Descending on the Sandbank =

Chinese guqin melody

Clip

"Wild Geese Descending on the Sandbank" (Chinese: 平沙落雁) is an ancient Chinese guqin melody, one of the most notable guqin pieces together with "Guangling San", "Yangguan San Die", "Meihua San Nong", and others.

Its notation first appeared in a Ming dynasty tablature Ancient Tones Authenticated (古音正宗, Gu Yin Zheng Zong）compiled by Zhu Changfang. The tranquil and serene piece depicts the scene of wild geese flying and alighting by the water. The Qing dynasty Guqin Notation of Heavenly Sound Pavilion had an introduction: "Set against the clear autumn sky, the air is crisp and fresh, while the breeze remains calm, as does the sandbank by the water. Amidst clouds stretching for miles, wild geese fly and chant, embodying lofty aspirations akin to those of hermits."

The musical composition commences with a soothing rhythm and delicate harmonics, illustrating the serene expanse of twilight on the autumn river. Subsequently, the melody undergoes a transition into a lively and agile tune, adorned with patterns reminiscent of geese calls, conveying vitality and jubilance. Eventually, it reverts to a harmonious and tranquil melody. The ambiance evokes serenity and ethereality, while simultaneously retaining lively intrigue. The distinctive techniques employed in Guqin performance, including harmonics and glissando, enhance the musical piece, endowing it with a profound artistic allure.

== Versions ==
The earliest surviving notation was first printed in the late Ming dynasty tablature Ancient Tones Authenticated by Zhu Changfang. Zhang Dai's Dream Memories of Tao'an stated that Yin Zhixian, the author of "Huí Yán Mìzhǐ", learned this piece from Wang Benwu in Shaoxing towards the end of the Wanli era. Subsequently, around fifty Guqin notation collections included different schools and versions of the piece. The authorship of these pieces also varied among collections, including poet Chen Zi'ang from the Tang dynasty, Mao Zhongmin and Tian Zhiweng from the Song dynasty, and Zhu Quan from the Ming dynasty.

== Modern adaptions and recordings ==
- "Jiao'an Guqin score" version, consisting of seven sections, represents the Guangling school, with recordings by Liu Shaochun, Zhang Ziqian, and others。
- "Qinxue Series" version, also with seven sections, commonly known as "North Sandbank", represented by Guan Pinghu's recordings.
- The Pei Jieqing transmitted score, also known as "Chuan School Sandbank" or "South Sandbank", can be found in the "Yinyinshi Qin Score" written by Hong Kong qin player Cai Deyun.
- "Mei'an Guqin Score" version, representing the Meian school, adds a section describing the calls of geese and the circling of the flock, vividly and distinctly, under the composition of Wang Yanqing.
- The Wu Jixi transmitted score, representing the Min school, is the version played by Chen Changlin.
- Versions by Wu Lansun and Wu Zhaoji, included in the "Wu School Qin Score".
