= List of guqin literature =

This is a list of literature for the guqin. Qin literature should be distinguished from qinpu which contains music tablature of some sort.

There are a number of ancient sources that discuss qin folklore, qin theory and general qin literature. Some of these books are available inserted into certain qinpu (qin tablature collections). The basic contents of qin literature is mainly essays discussing and describing the nature of qin music, the theory behind the notes and tones, the method of correct play, the history of qin music, lists of mentions in literature, etc. The detail can be very concise to extremely detailed and thorough. Some are mostly philosophical or artistic musings, others are scientific and technical.

The biggest collection of qin literature in existence is the Ming dynasty Qinshu Daquan 【琴書大全】 (1590), with a collection of 22 volumes.

== Han ==
- Qin Cao 【琴操】 by Cai Yong 蔡邕

A list of qin pieces played at the time with their descriptions

- Qin Shuo 【琴說】 by Liu Xiang 劉向

== Wei Jin ==
- Qin Fu 【琴賦】 by Ji Kang 嵇康

A poetical essay in praise of the qin

- Qin Lun 【琴論】 by Xie Zhuang 謝莊
- Qinsheng Lutu 【琴聲律圖】 by Qu Zhan 麴瞻
- Qinyong Zhifa 【琴用指法】 by Chen Zhongru 陳仲儒

An explanation of finger techniques used at the time

== Sui Tang ==
- Qin Jue 【琴訣】 by Bi Yijian 薛易簡
- Qinshu Zhengsheng 【琴書正聲】 by Chen Kangshi 陳康士

== Song Yuan ==
- Qin Shi 【琴史】 by Zhu Changwen 朱長文

A historical account of the qin with biographies of notable players

- Qin Shu 【琴述】 by Yuan Jue 袁桷
- Qin Jian 【琴箋】 by Cui Zhuandu 崔尊度
- Qin Yi 【琴議】 by Liu Jie 劉藉
- Qinlu Fawei 【琴律發微】 by Chen Minzi 陳敏子
- Lun Qin 【論琴】 by Cheng Yujian 成玉磵

== Ming Qing ==
- Qinshu Daquan 【琴書大全】 (1590)
- Qinsheng Shilufa 【琴聲十六法】 by Liang Qian 冷謙

An explanation of different styles of qin music

- Xishan Qinkuang 【谿山琴況】 by Xu Qingshan 徐青山

An explanation of different styles of qin music

- Gu Qin Baze 【鼓琴八則】 by Dai Yuan 戴源
- Yugu Zhai Qinpu 【與古齋琴譜】 by Zhu Tongjun 祝桐君 (1855)

A manual for constructing qins, etc

- Qinxue Congshu 【琴學叢書】 (1910–31)

Qinpu but contains many volumes on qin lore and discussion of qin

== Modern ==
- Qinshu Cunmu 【琴書存目】 by Zhou Ningyun (1915)

A list of "existing" qinpu; most listed have never been found

- Yuhe Xuan Qinxue Zhaiyao 【玉鶴軒琴學摘要：抄本】 by 詹澄秋 (1937)
- Qin Dao 【琴道】 by Gao Luopei 高羅佩 (1940, 1969)
- Cunjian Guqin Qupu Jilan 【存見古琴曲譜輯覽】 by Zha Fuxi 查阜西 (1958) ISBN 7-103-02379-4

A "dictionary" of qin music. Lists existing qinpu, all their prefaces and afterwords, and a complete collection of full qin songs

- Guqin Chujie 【古琴初階】 by 查阜西/沉草農/張子謙 (1961)
- Gu Zhifa Kao 【古指法考】 (1963)
- Yiren yu Yishi 【藝人與藝事】 by Rong Tianqi 容天祈 (1968)
- Deyin Tang Guqin Luncong 【德音堂古琴論叢】 by Huang Tipei 黃體培 (1972)
- Tanyi Xulu 【談藝續綠】 by Rong Tianqi 容天祈 (1975)
- Yongzhai Tanyi Lu 【庸齋談藝綠】 by Rong Tianqi 容天祈 (1977)
- Fanyi Qinpu zhi Yanjiu 【翻譯琴譜之研究】 by Wang Guangqi 王光祈 (1979)
- Luetan Huqin Yinyue Yishu 【略談古琴音樂藝術】 by Li Xiangting 李祥霆 (1981)
- Qinshi Chubian 【琴史初編】 by Xu Jian 許健 (1982) ISBN 7-103-02304-2
- Yongle Qinshu Jicheng 【永樂琴書集成】 by Ming Chengzu 明成祖 (1983)
- Guqin Xianyin 【古琴絃音】 by 卓芬玲 (1984)
- Zhilu Xian-ge: Yanzou Jiaocai 【指路絃歌‧演奏教材】 by 葛瀚聰 (1991)
- Guqin Yinyue Yishu 【古琴音樂藝術】 by Ye Mingmei 葉明媚 (1992)
- Tangdai Guqin Yanzou Meixue ji Yinyue Sixiang Yanjiu 【唐代古琴演奏美學及音樂思想研究】 by Li Xiangting 李祥霆 (1993)
- Zha Fuxi Qinxue Wencui 【查阜西琴學文萃】 by Zha Fuxi 查阜西 (1995)
- Guqin Huizhen: Yanqin Zhai Song-Yuan-Ming-Qing Guqin Zhan 【古琴薈珍‧硯琴齋宋元明清古琴展】 (1998)
- Zhongguo Guqin Zhencui: Tang-Song-Yuan-Ming 109 zhang Chuanshi Guqin 【中國古琴珍萃‧唐宋元明109張傳世古琴】 by 中國藝術研究院音樂研究所 (1998)
- Guqin Yanzhoufa 【古琴演奏法】 by Gong Yi 龔一 (1999) ISBN 7-5320-6621-5

Gong Yi's teaching manual for the qin. Includes fingering and many pieces in staff notation, some with qin tablature, some with Gong Yi's new guqin staff notation form.

- Qindao yu Meixue: Qindao zhi Sixiang Jichu yu Meixue Jiazhi zhi Yanjiu (Zi Xian-Qin Liang-Han qi Wei-Jin Nan-Bei-Chao) 【琴道與美學‧琴道之思想基礎與美學價值之研究（自先秦兩漢迄魏晉南北朝）】 by 李美燕 (1999)
- Zhongguo Qinxue 【中國琴學】 卷壹 by Li Mingzhong (2000).
- Guqin Jishi Tulu: 2000 nian Taibei Guqin Yishu-jie Tang-Song-Yuan-Ming Baiqin Zhanshi Lu 【古琴紀事圖綠‧2000年臺北古琴藝術節唐宋元明百琴展實綠】 (2000)
- Zhongguo Qinshi Yanyi 【中国琴史演义】 by Yin Wei (2001) ISBN 7-222-03206-1/I‧866

An outline of the legendary and historical stories about the qin.

- Guqin Shiyong Jiaocheng 【古琴實用教程】 by Li Xiangting 李祥霆 (2004) ISBN 7-80667-439-X

A very good teaching manual for the qin. Step by step with every piece explained in detail. Recommended.

- Qinxue Beiyao 【琴學備要】 by Gu Meigeng 顧梅羹 (2004)
- Tangdai Chen Zhuo Lun Guqin Zhifa: Yao Bingyan Qinxue Zhu Shu zhi Yi 【唐代陳拙論古琴指法‧姚丙炎琴學著述之一】 by Yao Bingyan and Huang Shuzhi (2005) ISBN 988-98739-1-5

Newly edited printing of a Tang dynasty document on finger techniques. Highly useful. In a planned series of books printing important unpublished works called Qinxue Congkan【琴學叢刊】 ("collection of printings on qin study").

- Shiqu Buzhi Suocong Qi - Cheng Gongliang Dapu Ji 【是曲不知所從起-成公亮打譜集】by Cheng Gongliang and Huang Shuzhi (2006) ISBN 988-98739-2-3

Volume II of the Qinxue Congkan.

- Jueshi Qingyin 【絕世清音】 by Wu Zhao 吳釗 (2005) ISBN 7-80574-908-6/G‧259

An introduction to the qin, its history and culture, with short biographies of recent and contemporary players; finely illustrated. With a CD contain eight melodies by the author.

- Taiyin Xisheng 【太音希聲】 by Yi Cunguo (2005) ISBN 7-308-04261-8/J‧093
- Gu Qin 【古琴】 bt Zhang Huaying (2005) ISBN 7-213-02955-X
- Guqin Congtan 【古琴丛谈】 by Guo Ping (2006) ISBN 7-80713-209-4
- Guqin Meixue Sixiang Yanjiu 【古琴美学思想研究】 by Miao Jianhua (2006) ISBN 7-80692-224-5
- Qi-xian Midao: Jingdian Guqin Gushi 【七弦味味道‧经典古古琴故事】 by Xian Zhi (2006) ISBN 7-80223-171-X
- Zhepai Guqin Yishu 【浙派古琴艺朮】 by Xu Junyue and Xiaoying (2006) ISBN 7-5321-3030-4
- Abiding With Antiquity 【與古齋琴譜】 (Yugu Zhai Qinpu translation) by James Binkley (2007) ISBN 978-1-4303-0346-6
- 3rd Bridge Helix by Yuri Landman (2008), an article which clarifies the physical background related to the musical scale of the Moodswinger and the Guqin

=== Date of publication not known ===
- Zhongguo Qinyi Jinian 【中國琴藝紀年】
- Zha Fuxi Qinxue Wencui 【查阜西琴學文翠】
- Cunjian Guqin Zhifa Puzi Jilan 【存見古琴指法譜字輯覽‧油印本】 by Zha Fuxi 查阜西 (1959)
- Gu Zhifa Kao 【古指法考‧油印本】 by Guan Pinghu 管平湖
- Lidai Qinren Chuan 【歷代琴人傳‧油印本】 by Zha Fuxi 查阜西
- Zhongguo Minqin Tulan 【中國名琴圖鑒】
