= Li Shishi =

Chinese Song Dynasty female singer

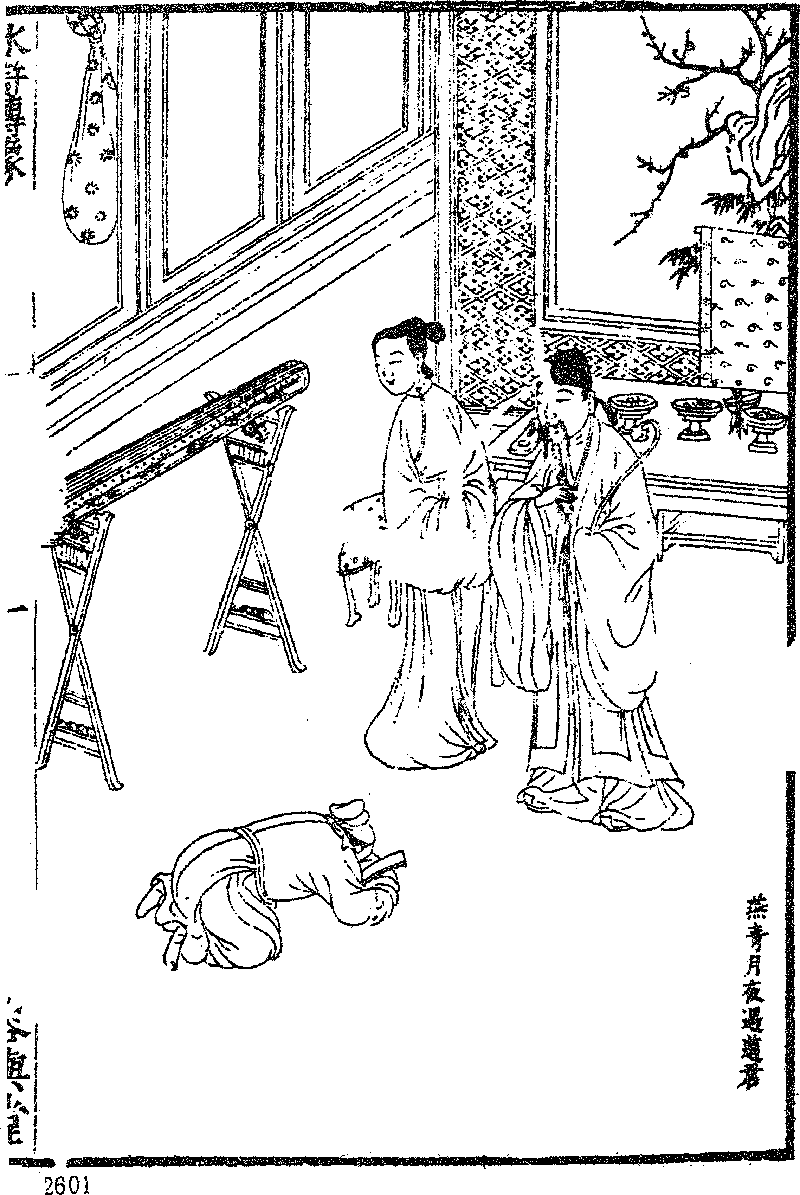
- At night Yan Qing meets the Emperor by a trick in the Rongyu Tang edition of the Water Margin, with Li Shishi in the middle
- Born: Wang Shishi; Bianjing, Song Empire (present day Kaifeng, China)
- Occupation: courtesan
- Era: Northern Song dynasty
- Father: Wang Yin

Li Shishi
- Water Margin character

In-universe information
- Designation: female singer

Chinese names
- Simplified Chinese: 李师师
- Traditional Chinese: 李師師
- Pinyin: Lǐ Shīshī
- Wade–Giles: Li Shih-shih

Li Shishi (?-?) was a courtesan(Chinese: 歌妓 / 歌伎; pinyin: Jiǎojì) from Bianjing (now Kaifeng), the capital of the Song Empire. At the time, courtesan refers to women who engaged in the performing arts for a living, and their scope of work included: singing, dancing, reciting poetry and painting during the Northern Song dynasty (960 - 1127). According to Gui Er Ji (Chinese: 貴耳集; simplified Chinese: 贵耳集; traditional Chinese: 貴耳集) written by Zhang Duanyi (simplified Chinese: 张端义; traditional Chinese: 張端義), Emperor Huizong was a regular patron of hers. She fled to Zhejiang or Hunan (recorded in Da Song Xuanhe Yishi, simplified Chinese: 大宋宣和遗事; traditional Chinese: 大宋宣和遺事) after the Jingkang Incident of the Jin–Song wars occurred in year 1127 AD, as recorded in Mo Man Lu (simplified Chinese: 墨漫录; traditional Chinese: 墨漫彔) by Zhang Bangji (simplified Chinese: 张邦基; traditional Chinese: 張邦基).

== Early life ==
Born Wang Shishi, her mother died soon after her birth. Her father fed her bean starch to keep her alive. Her father, Wang Yin, was worker in a clothing pigment factory in Bianjing. When Li Shishi was four, her father was jailed for delaying an Imperial textile order. He later died in prison. Li went at first to an orphanage but was later taken in by a courtesan named Li Yun, who owned a song and dance venue. Li Yun changed the girl's surname to Li. (Her given name, Shishi, has Buddhist connotations. Li Shishi was taken to the entertainment district Jinqian Xiang and put to work as a young courtesan.

== As a singer ==
Li Shishi was renown for her beauty and artistic abilities.Li Shishi is a famous "little singing(小唱)" female singer in the Northern Song Dynasty. She is at the top of the list. Her representative songs include "Shaonian You(少年游)", "Lanling King(兰陵王)", "Da ming(大酩)" and "Six Ugly(六丑)", all of which were written by Zhou Bangyan. Amongst her admirers were the renowned poet and bureaucrat Zhou Bangyan and the outlaw Song Jiang. Her reputation spread to the Emperor, Huizong, who visited her disguised as a businessman in 1109. Her charm and elegance led him to visit her whenever he could after the meeting. Their relationship became an open secret in Bianjing. Huizong had a tunnel dug from the palace to Li Shishi's house. Some sources relate that Li Shishi moved into the Emperor's palace and was given the title Lady of Ying State and Li Mingfei (李明妃). Part of the story is told in the classic novel, the Water Margin.

In 1126 Huizong took responsibility for overwhelming losses during the Jin–Song Wars and abdicated in favour of his eldest son Zhao Huan (Emperor Qinzong). Realising she was in a precarious position, Li Shishi donated all the gifts from Huizong to the army who were putting up a valiant defence, and requested the Emperor's permission to become a Daoist nun. In 1127 Bianjing was overrun by the Jin army. Huizong and his court was captured and Huizong later died, ending the Northern Song dynasty. Li is reported to have fled south, although other accounts give that she committed suicide by swallowing a gold hairpin after she was offered to a Jin commander.

The general theory is that Li Shishi finally escaped to the Jiangsu and Zhejiang areas and sang for local scholar-officials to make a living. Later Li Shishi married a businessman and died of old age. The poet Liu Zihui once met Li Shishi by chance in Hunan. Li Shishi was already old at that time.

== In fiction ==
In the classical novel Water Margin, Li Shishi encounters the outlaws from Liangshan Marsh on two occasions; on the second, more important encounter, she befriends Yan Qing and agrees to become his sworn sister. She then promises Yan Qing that she will tell the emperor about the outlaws' plight and desire to be granted amnesty. Water Margin, Chapter 72.

== Poems about Li Shishi ==
Song dynasty poet Chao Chongzhi described Li Shishi's dancing and singing talents as follows:

Watch her dance to "Nichang Yuyi Qu", "Nichang Yuyi Qu" (霓裳羽衣曲; literally: "Song of Colourful Plumage") was a musical piece presented by Yang Jingzhong (楊敬忠), jiedushi of Hexi (河西), during the Tianbao era (713-741) of the reign of Emperor Xuanzong of the Tang dynasty. listen to her recite / sing "Yushu Houting Hua". "Yushu Houting Hua" (玉樹後庭花; literally: "Jade Trees and Courtyard Flowers") was a poem written by the Chen dynasty's last ruler Chen Shubao (553-604). It was of the gongti (simplified Chinese: 宮体; traditional Chinese: 宮體; literally: "palace style") genre of Chinese poetry. (看舞霓裳羽衣曲，聽歌玉樹後庭花)

Southern Song era poet Zhu Dunru (朱敦儒; 1081–1159) wrote:

Performing an interpretation of "Yangguan." "Yangguan" refers to the "Yangguan Qu" (陽關曲; literally: "Song of Yangguan"), which is also known as "Yangguan San Die" (陽關三疊; literally: "Three Overlaps of Yangguan"). It is an ancient Chinese musical piece based on a poem by Tang dynasty poet Wang Wei (699-759). In another tone and style, in the previous dynasty. The "previous dynasty" refers to the Northern Song dynasty. only Madam Li (Li Shishi) was capable of doing that. (解唱《陽關》別調聲，前朝惟有李夫人)

== Bibliography ==
- Ditmore, Melissa Hope (2006). Encyclopedia of Prostitution and Sex Work. Greenwood Publishing Group. ISBN 9780313329692.
- Levine, Ari Daniel (2009). "The Reigns of Hui-tsung (1100–1126) and Ch'in-tsung (1126–1127) and the Fall of the Northern Sung". In Paul Jakov Smith; Denis C. Twitchett (eds.). The Cambridge History of China: Volume 5, The Sung dynasty and Its Precursors, 907–1279. Cambridge University Press. pp. 556–643. ISBN 978-0-521-81248-1.
- Lee, Lily Xiao Hong; Wiles, Sue (2014). Biographical Dictionary of Chinese Women: Tang Through Ming, 618-1644. M.E. Sharpe. ISBN 9780765643162.
- West, Stephen H.; Idema, Wilt L. (2014). The Orphan of Zhao and Other Yuan Plays: The Earliest Known Versions. Columbia University Press. ISBN 9780231538107.
- Woo, X. L. (2016). Love Tales of Ancient China. Algora Publishing. ISBN 9781628942064.
- Zhenjun, Zhang; Jing, Wang (2017). Song Dynasty Tales: A Guided Reader. World Scientific. ISBN 9789813143296.
