= Youlan =

Youlan may refer to:

- Youlan is a Chinese name, usually used for females. Youlan may refer to:
- Youlan (noble) (幼蘭), mother of China's last emperor Puyi and princess consort of Zaifeng, Prince Chun
- Jieshi Diao Youlan (碣石調幽蘭), ancient guqin melody
- Youlan (town) (幽兰镇), Nanchang County, Jiangxi
