= Seven Should-not-plays (Chinese music) =

When the Gu-qin should not be played

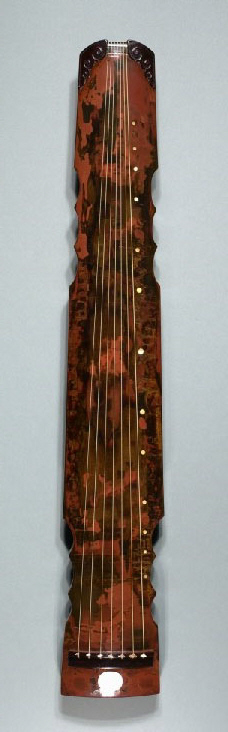
Gu-qin

Chinese traditional culture identifies seven types of circumstances in which one should not play the Gu-qin:

1. When there is a high wind or heavy rain;
2. When in a mood of great sorrow;
3. When one's dress is untidy;
4. When drunk and crazy;
5. When one has not burned incense;
6. When one does not understand music or is in rude surroundings;
7. When one has not bathed or the place is dirty.

== See also ==
- Six Avoidances (Chinese Music)
