= Six Avoidances (Chinese music) =

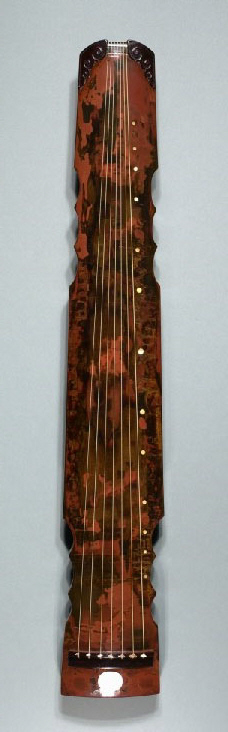
Gu-Qin

In Chinese traditional culture, regarding playing Gu-qin, the player should avoid six kinds of occasions:

1. Avoid the time of learning of someone's death;
2. Avoid the time of crying sorrowfully;
3. Avoid the time of being busy with something else;
4. Avoid the time of being angry;
5. Avoid the time of sex;
6. Avoid the time of astonishment.

== See also ==
- Seven Should-not-plays (Chinese Music)
