= Guqin playing technique =

The playing techniques of the guqin, sometimes called fingerings, are more numerous than those of any other Chinese or Western musical instrument.

== Basic sounds ==
The music of the qin can be categorised as three distinctively different "sounds". The first is san yin 〔散音〕, which means "scattered sounds". This is produced by plucking the required string to sound an open note. The second is fan yin 〔泛音〕, or "floating sounds". These are harmonics, in which the player lightly touches the string with one or more fingers of the left hand at a position indicated by the hui dots, pluck and lift, creating a crisp and clear sound. The third is an yin 〔按音 / 案音 / 實音 / 走音〕, or "stopped sounds". This forms the bulk of most qin pieces and requires the player to press on a string with a finger or thumb of the left hand until it connects with the surface board, then pluck. Afterwards, the musician's hand often slides up and down, thereby modifying the pitch. This technique resembles that of playing a slide guitar across the player's lap, but the technique of the qin is very varied and utilises the whole hand.

According to the book Cunjian Guqin Zhifa Puzi Jilan, there are around 1,070 different finger techniques used for the qin, with or without names. It therefore uses the most finger techniques of any instrument in Chinese, or even Western, music. Most are obsolete, but around 50 or so are sufficient to know in modern practice.

== Nails ==
When plucking the strings, fake nails are not desirable. One will often leave their fingernails long and cut them into an elliptical shape. The length is subjective and will depend on the player's preference but it is usually around 3 – 4 mm from the finger tip. If it is too short then the finger tip will deaden the sound as it touches the string after the nail has plucked it. If it is too long then the fingers can be cumbersome and can impede performance. Generally the nails of the right hand are kept long, while the nails of the left are cut short, so as to be able to press on the strings without hindrance. For people who have brittle fingernails the Yugu Zhai Qinpu has some methods of strengthening them. Unlike other plucked instruments such as guzheng and pipa, plectrums and fake nails should be avoided. Unlike the guzheng and pipa where one must attack the strings with force, thus, susceptible to fingernail breakage, the qin requires little force to play. Furthermore, fake-nails tend to hinder the fingers or create an unsatisfactory tone. Additionally, because one can feel the qin strings better, it is best to pluck with natural fingernails.

== Technique ==
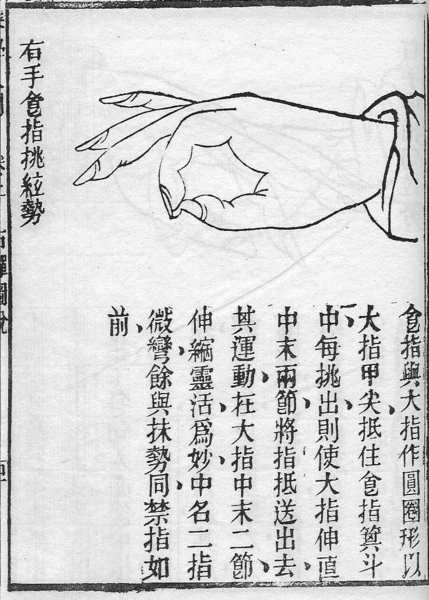
〈挑〉 Tiao

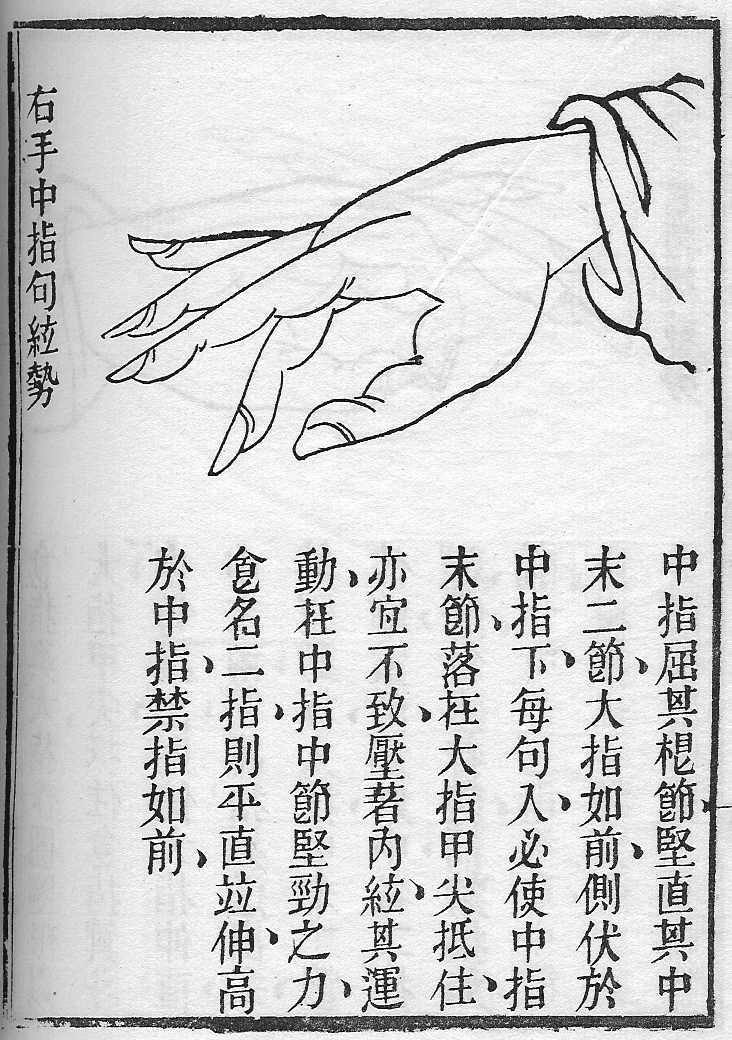
〈勾〉 Gou

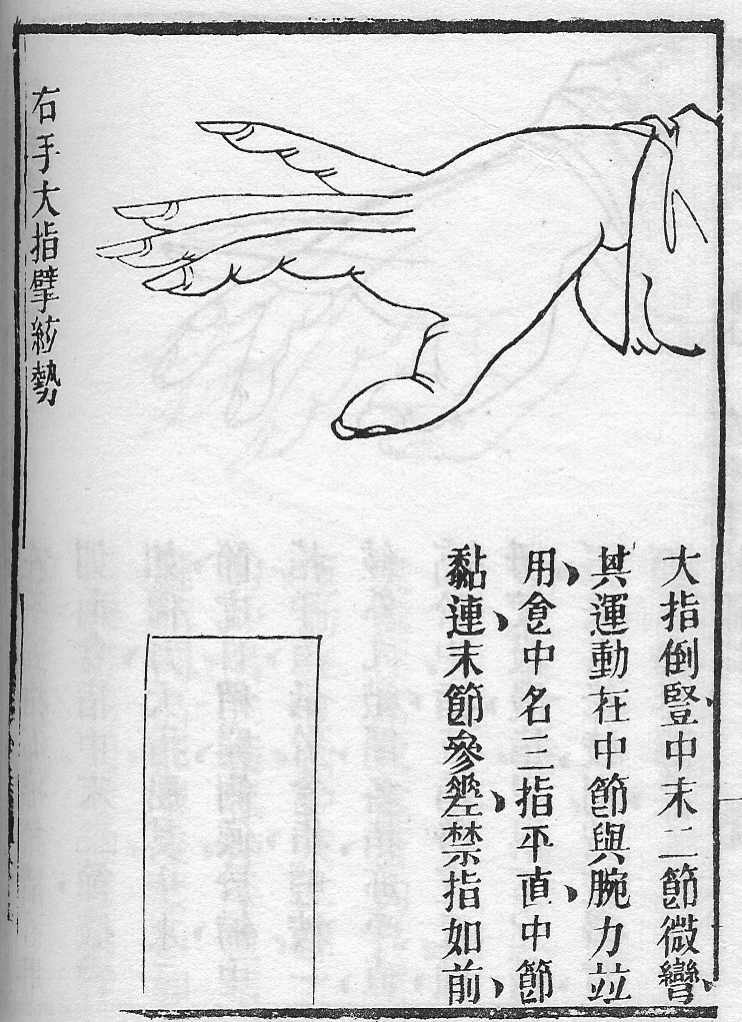
〈劈〉 Pi

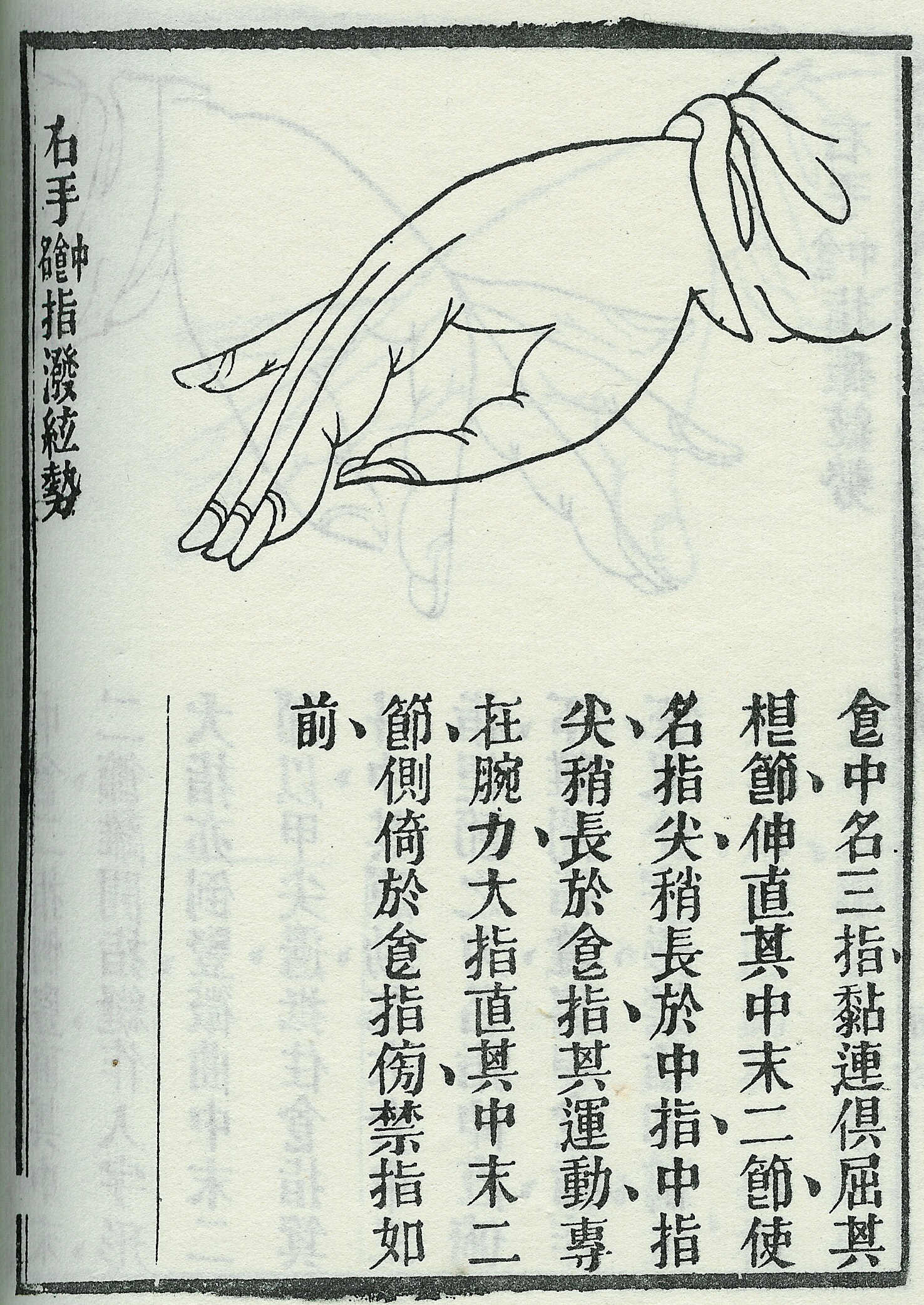
〈撥〉 Bo

The above four figures are from an old handbook.

=== Right hand ===
There are eight basic right hand finger techniques: pi 〈劈〉 (thumb pluck outwards), tuo 〈托〉 (thumb pluck inwards), mo 〈抹〉 (index in), tiao 〈挑〉 (index out), gou 〈勾〉 (middle in), ti 〈剔〉 (middle out), da 〈打〉 (ring in), and zhai 〈摘〉 (ring out); the little finger is not used. Out of these basic eight, their combinations create many. Cuo 〈撮〉 is to pluck two strings at the same time, lun 〈輪/轮〉 is to pluck a string with the ring, middle and index finger out in quick succession, the suo 〈鎖/锁〉 technique involves plucking a string several times in a fixed rhythm, bo 〈撥/拔〉 cups the fingers and attacks two strings at the same time, and gun fu 〈滚拂〉 is to create glissandi by running up and down the strings continuously with the index and middle fingers. These are just a few.

=== Left hand ===
Left hand techniques start from the simple pressing down on the string (mostly with the thumb between the flesh and nail, and the ring finger), sliding up or down to the next note (shang 〈上〉 and xia 〈下〉), to vibrati by swaying the hand (yin 〈吟〉 and nao 〈猱〉, there are as many as 15 plus different forms of vibrato), plucking the string with the thumb whilst the ring finger stops the string at the lower position (qiaqi 〈掐起 / 搯起〉), hammering on a string using the thumb (yan 〈掩 / 罨〉), to more difficult techniques such as pressing on several strings at the same time.

=== Both hands ===
Techniques executed by both hands in tandem are more difficult to achieve, like qia cuo san sheng 〈掐撮三聲/掐撮三声〉 (a combination of hammering on and off then plucking two strings, then repeating), to more stylised forms, like pressing of all seven strings with the left, then strumming all the strings with the right, then the left hand quickly moves up the qin, creating a rolling sound like a bucket of water being thrown in a deep pool of water (this technique is used in the Shu style of Liu Shui to imitate the sound of water).

== Other issues ==
In order to master the qin, there are in excess of 50 different techniques that must be mastered. Even the most commonly used (such as tiao) are difficult to get right without proper instruction from a teacher. Also, certain techniques vary from teacher to teacher and school to school.

There are also a lot of obsolete fingerings and notation that are rarely used in modern tablature. There are now new books that have begun to be published about these fingerings and notation as qin culture and study gains momentum. Sometimes, guqin can played with violin bow. It has a tone similar to that of a cello, but raspier.

== Footnotes ==
1. Guo, Ping. Guqin Congtan 【古琴丛谈】. Page 112.
2. Zhang, He. Qinxue Rumen 【琴學入門】. Volume 1, leaves 39, 40, 43 and 47.
3. Wu, Jinglüe and Wenguang. Yushan Wushi Qinpu 【虞山吴氏琴谱】 The Qin Music Repertoire of the Wu Family. Pages 507-526.
4. Wang, Binglu. Mei'an Qinpu 【楳盦珡諩】. Volume 1 leaves 18-24.
5. Yao, Bingyan and Huang, Shuzhi. Tangdai Chen Zhuo Lun Guqin Zhifa: Yao Bingyan Qinxue Zhu Shu zhi Yi 【唐代陳拙論古琴指法‧姚丙炎琴學著述之一】.
