= Guo Chuwang =

Guo Chuwang (Chinese: 郭楚望, 1190–1260) was a patriot at the end of the Song dynasty and a musician of the guqin who composed the piece Xiaoxiang Shuiyun (瀟湘水雲). Guo was considered the most outstanding representative of the Zhejiang genre. He was the teacher of Liu Zhifang.
