= Chao Buzhi =

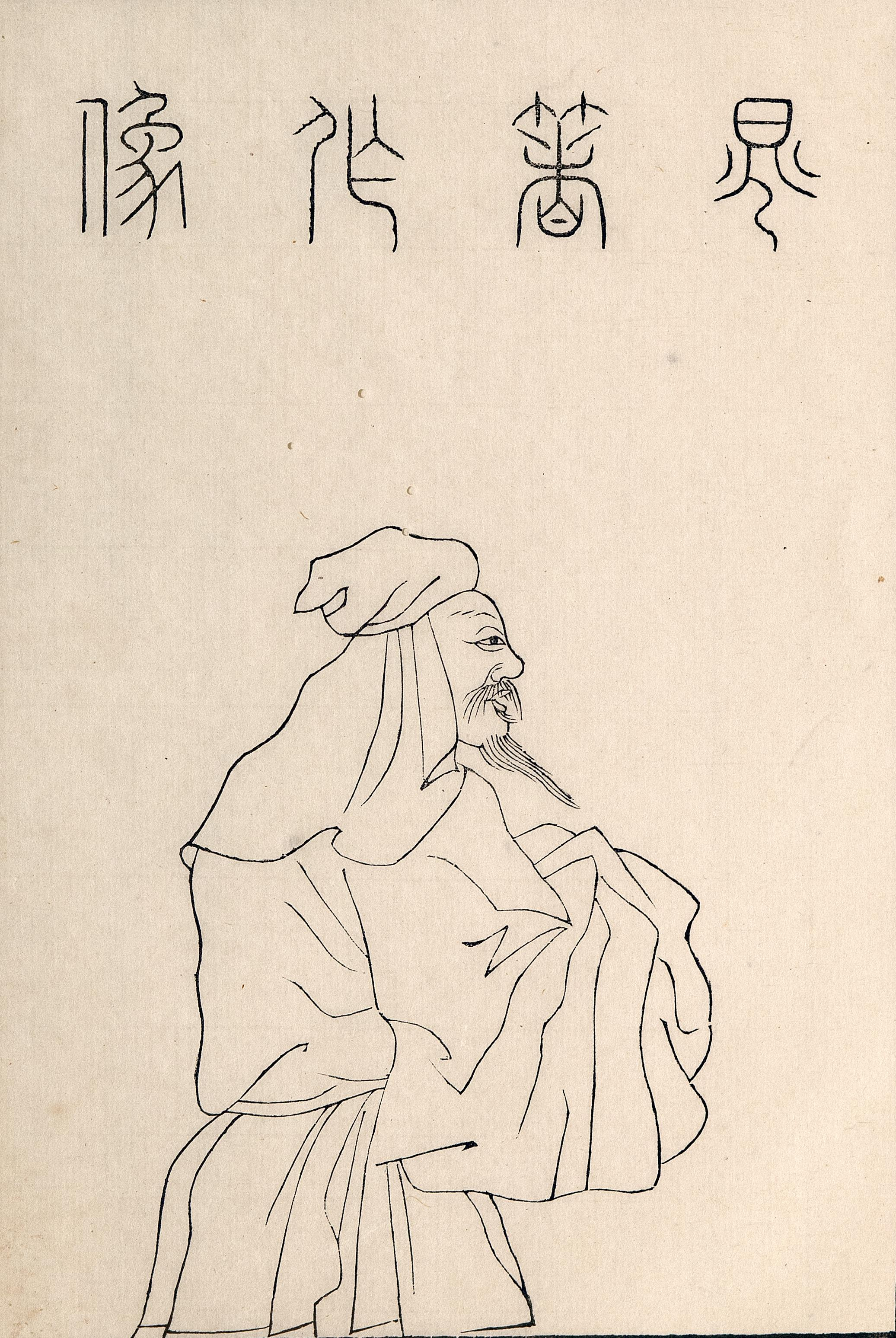
Chao Buzhi

Chao Buzhi (Chinese: 晁補之, 1053–1110), courtesy name Wujiu (無咎), style name Guilaizi (歸來子), was a native of Juye in Jizhou (today part of Shandong). He was a Song dynasty poet and man of letters. Skilled in calligraphy and painting, adept at poetry and prose, he was praised as a versatile writer. Together with Zhang Lei, Huang Tingjian, and Qin Guan, he was known as one of the "Four Scholars of the under Su Shi", and with Zhang Lei he was jointly referred to as "Chao and Zhang." His works Jilei Ji (雞肋集, Chicken Rib Collection) and Chao shi qinqu waipian (晁氏琴趣外篇, Supplementary Essays on the Qin by Master Chao) have been handed down. He was the son of Chao Duanyou.

== Biography ==
Chao Buzhi came from a family of literary tradition. In the reign of Emperor Zhenzong, Chao Jiong enjoyed great fame, and thereafter "since Chao Jiong, the Chao family has passed down literature from generation to generation; almost everyone had their collected works." His younger cousin Chao Chongzhi was also a poet of the Jiangxi poetry school. Chao Buzhi's style of writing and his character were deeply influenced by Su Shi. At the age of seventeen, he followed his father Chao Duanyou, who took up office as magistrate of Xincheng in Hangzhou, and wrote the essay Qi Shu (七述, Seven Narratives), describing the sights of Qiantang. At the time, Su Shi, who was serving as assistant prefect of Hangzhou and a close friend of his father, praised the work, saying, "I can lay down my pen now," and also called him "capable of anything in writing, erudite, eloquent and outstanding, far surpassing others, surely to be famous in the world." Later, when Chao Buzhi served as assistant prefect of Yangzhou, Su Shi was the prefect there, and the two often composed poems in response to each other.

In 1079 he obtained the jinshi degree, placing first in both the examinations at Kaifeng and at the Ministry of Rites. In the same year he was appointed as Canjun (assistant officer) of Cizhou. At the beginning of Yuanyou he was appointed as Corrector at the Imperial Academy, then Gentleman for Discussion, and later served as Proofreader of the Imperial Library and assistant prefect of Yangzhou.

In 1094, he was appointed prefect of Qizhou (modern Licheng, Shandong). Because of inaccuracies in compiling the Veritable Records of Emperor Shenzong, he was demoted to Ying Tian Prefecture (modern Shangqiu, Henan), and on the third day of the ninth month he was further demoted to assistant prefect of Bozhou (modern Bozhou, Anhui). In 1099 he was again demoted to Superintendent of Chuzhou (modern Lishui, Zhejiang), but on the way there his mother died and he observed mourning.

In 1099 he served as Salt and Wine Tax Commissioner of Xinzhou (modern Shangrao, Jiangxi). At the end of the Daguan era he was appointed prefect of Dazhou (modern Daxian, Sichuan), but did not assume office. He was then reassigned to Sizhou (northeast of modern Xuyi, Jiangsu), but died soon after taking office.
