= Guqin aesthetics =

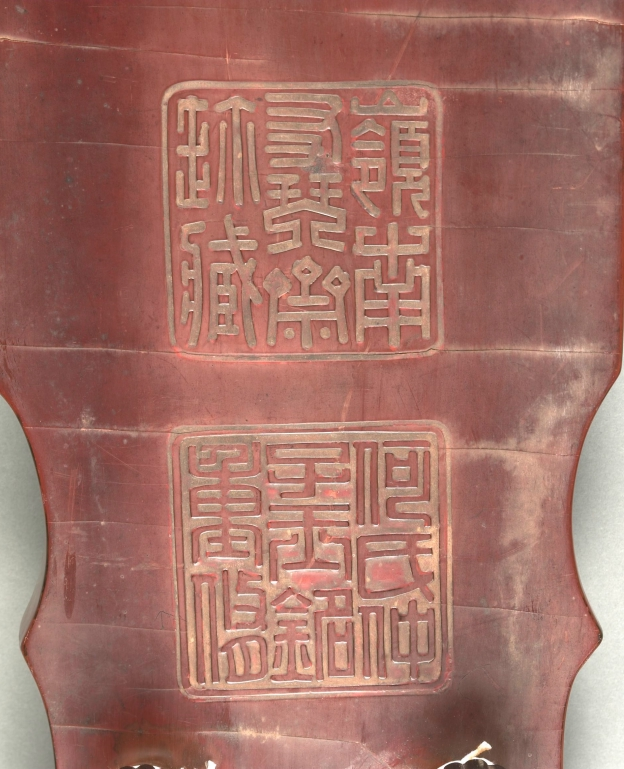
The seals at the back of the Hewu Longxiang qin

The guqin is a Chinese musical instrument with a long history of being played since ancient times. When the guqin is played, a number of aesthetic elements are involved.

== Aesthetics ==
The first aesthetic is musicality. In the second section of "Pingsha Luoyan", for example, the initial few bars contain a nao vibrato followed by a phase of sliding up and down the string, even when the sound has already become inaudible. The average person trained in music may question whether this is really "music". Normally, some players would pluck the string very lightly to create a very quiet sound. For some players, this plucking isn't necessary. Instead of trying to force a sound out of the string one should allow the natural sounds emit from the strings. Some players say that the sliding on the string even when the sound has disappeared is a distinctive feature in qin music. It creates a "space" or "void" in a piece, playing without playing, sound without sound. In fact, when the viewer looks at the player sliding on the string without sounds, the viewer automatically "fills in the notes" with their minds. This creates a connection between player, instrument and listener. This, of course, cannot happen when listening to a recording, as one cannot see the performer. It can also be seen as impractical in recording, as the player would want to convey sound as much as possible towards a third audience. But in fact, there is sound, the sound coming from the fingers sliding on the string. With a really good qin, silk strings, and a perfectly quiet environment, all the tones can be sounded. And since the music is more player oriented than listener oriented, and the player knows the music, he/she can hear it even if the sound is not there. And with silk strings the sliding sound might be called the qi or "life force" of the music. The really empty sounds are the pauses between notes. However, if one cannot create a sound that can be heard when sliding on a string, it is generally acceptable to lightly pluck the string to create a very quiet sound.

In the music of the qin, we often come across (especially in harmonics) the use of the same note to two different strings. A good example of this would be in the main harmonic sections of "Meihua Sannong", where at the last three notes of the first two phrases all play sol (first sol on the sixth string at 7th hui, second on third string at 9th hui, then again on the sixth string at 7th hui). The question would be why does one need to play the sol on the third string when one can play sol thrice on the sixth string. One reason is timbre; although both these two positions sound the same note, they sound different or have a different quality to them. Another reason is to add flavor during performance. We have other examples, like the first two phrases of Shenren Chang, where the playing of the harmonics is on the left of the qin on the first phrase, then the same notes are played on the right of the qin. This adds symmetry to the play, and we often see this in a number of qin melodies where the same notes are mimicked in a different way.

== Philosophy of the qin ==
Qin music tends to linger on certain notes, with an emphasis on silence and timbre, giving it a meditative quality. Being an instrument historically associated with literati, its aim is Confucian (in trying to cultivate one's mind) as well as Daoist (in seeking harmony between man and nature). 「琴棋書畫」 (qin qi shu hua) refers to the Four Arts of the Chinese Scholar, wherein 『琴』 qin/music refers specifically to guqin. [This phrase is a rather late invention of the Song period (according to the Wuzhizhai Qinpu), so it is not clear how essential it was to the pedagogy of earlier scholar classes]. Although historical texts suggest that there were literati playing the qin in a variety of styles, evidence of this variation in performance practices and playstyles often appears in the written complaints of literati who adhered to a more traditional perspective, and believed that proper qin performance should be contemplative, and should avoid more popular sounds that they deemed to be vulgar.

Because of this, the qin is not so popular amongst the uninitiated, and because of the decline of its popularity in the periods of political disturbances (when the qin was seen as an elitist and feudal instrument. These days, the qin is referred to as a "folk instrument" to move away from these connotations), very few people are familiar with it, even in China. However, there has been a revival of interest in recent years, especially among Westerners, as the qin embodies a philosophy which appeals to those who wish to escape the stress and confusion of the modern world. Some may argue that the spiritual side is one of the most appealing aspects of qin music, since much other music concerned with entertainment, social bonding or academic issues, the music of the qin offers a breath of fresh air, concerning with the individual and his/her connection with nature and surroundings. Of course, there is no reason why one cannot submit to a realist and/or idealistic view of the purpose of the qin music. It all depends on the player's preference of what s/he wants out of qin music.

There is much comment in qin texts decrying "vulgar" music, meaning that there was much of it around. The idealization of scholars misses a lot of the reality and beauty of pure music.

Some people (particularly the younger generation) find qin music difficult to appreciate upon first listening. The reason for this may be because they rate it against music that they only heard in their life, namely modern or popular music. Because qin music is simple and plain (minimalist, some might say), they may find it boring when compared to the fast beat and sound saturated songs of the modern era. This can lead to a misunderstanding of the true nature of qin music and its aesthetic purposes. Perhaps some people's perceptions of qin music can be summed up in a quote:

Occidental listeners have great difficulty in perceiving the delicate shades of ch'in [qin] playing and in appreciating its spirituality. But the average Oriental cannot appreciate it either. The ch'in does not court popularity, nor does it suit dilettantism. It is the instrument of philosophers and sages. In the privacy of a closed room, alone or before a few selected friends who listen respectfully and silently, the immaterial notes of the ch'in reveal to the listeners the ultimate truths of life and religion.

— Curt Sachs, The History of Musical Instruments

On the other hand, musicians and music lovers can easily appreciate qin music because they can hear music objectively and have a better understanding of music in an ethnomusicological context.

There has also been a move to a more Western approach to qin music. A handful of professional players prefer to look at the qin from a purely realist and scientific approach, treating the qin as a purely musical instrument, rather than a cultural phenomenon. This is due to some traditionalists treating the instrument as an 'other-worldly' object than a 'this-worldly' one. This move to a much more technical approach signifies a progression in qin study and appreciation; holding on to too much old values tends to impede the transmission of qin. An example would be composition. Although around 60-odd new compositions have been composed for the qin since the 1960s, all in all, no one plays them. The reason is that some believe these new compositions do not compare with ancient scores. But technically, these ancient scores were new at the time when they were composed. Some fear that in 100 years' time, people then might say that we have contributed nothing new to qin. That is not to say that the qin cannot be viewed in a traditional way, but to say that the qin is also capable of a progression into new territory. There is no reason why players cannot embrace both traditional and scientific study of the qin.

== Manifestations of qin music ==
Classical descriptions of guqin aesthetics discuss shengjiang 〔聲像〕 or "manifestations of sound" of the qin. These are single words used to describe the mood or theme of the piece. The number of these 'manifestations' are disputed. Some say only 4, some say 13-16, and some say over 24. Listed in some qinpu they have lengthy descriptions of each manifestation, going into every detail.

The most basic words used to describe qin music are, for example, Yushan school's qing 『清』, wei 『微』, dan 『淡』 and yuan 『遠』, or "pure", "profound", "light" and "distant". Another important essay on qin manifestations is Xishan Qinkuang 【谿山琴况】 which lists 24 qin manifestations in great detail. This essay has several layers; some words describe the playing method, some describe ornamentation and some describe the body of the music. They also explain the union between musician and instrument and how to achieve unity with the music.

== Footnotes ==
1. London Youlan Qin Society (2004) Yaji 5 September 2004 (http://www.ukchinesemusic.com/londonyoulanqin/yaji_20040905.htm, 29 July 2006)
2. Personal correspondence with John Thompson.
3. Sachs, Curt. The History of Musical Instruments.
4. Li, Xiangting. Tangdai Guqin Yanzou Meixue ji Yinyue Sixiang Yanjiu 【唐代古琴演奏美學及音樂思想研究】. Chapter one: sections 1-13.
5. Xu, Shangying. Dahuan Ge Qinpu 【大還閣琴譜】. Folio 1.
