= Chao Chongzhi =

Chao Chongzhi (Chinese: 晁冲之) was a Song Chinese poet. His cousins Chao Buzhi, Chao Shuozhi, Chao Yongzhi were all famous litterateur at that time. Chao had studied with Chen Shidao in the year one. He was a close friend of Lü Benzhong. His son Chao Gongwu was the author of Catalogue of Jun Zhai (郡斋读书志).

Chao was among the 26 poets of Lü Benzhong's Faction maps of the Jiangxi poets society (江西诗社宗派图). Liu Kezhuang said he is a pioneer of Lu You (南渡后放翁可以继之), and his poem Song yi shangren huan chuzhou langyashan (送一上人还滁州琅琊山) was praised by Wang Shizhen.
