= Guqin notation =

The notation of the guqin is a unique form of tablature for the Chinese musical instrument, with a history of over 1,500 years, still in use today.

== History ==
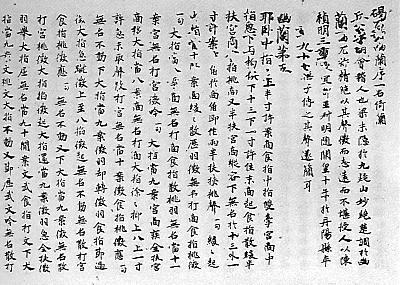
《碣石調幽蘭第五》 "Jieshi Diao Youlan No.5" in longhand form.

Written qin music did not directly tell what notes were played; instead, it was written in a tablature detailing tuning, finger positions, and stroke technique, thus comprising a step by step method and description of how to play a piece. Some tablatures do indicate notes using the gongche system, or indicate rhythm using dots. The earliest example of the modern shorthand tablature survives from around the twelfth century CE. An earlier form of music notation from the Tang era survives in just one manuscript, dated to the seventh century CE, called Jieshi Diao Youlan 《碣石調幽蘭》 (Solitary Orchid in Stone Tablet Mode). It is written in a longhand form called wenzi pu 〔文字譜〕 (literally "written notation"), said to have been created by Yongmen Zhou (雍門周) during the Warring States period, which gives all the details using ordinary written Chinese characters. Later in the Tang dynasty Cao Rou (曹柔) and others simplified the notation, using only the important elements of the characters (like string number, plucking technique, hui number and which finger to stop the string) and combined them into one character notation. This meant that instead of having two lines of written text to describe a few notes, a single character could represent one note, or sometimes as many as nine. This notation form was called jianzi pu 〔減字譜〕 (literally "reduced notation") and it was a great advancement for recording qin pieces. It was so successful that from the Ming dynasty onwards, a great many qinpu 〔琴譜〕 (qin tablature collections) appeared, the most famous and useful being "Shenqi Mipu" (神奇秘譜, lit. The Mysterious and Marvellous Tablature) compiled by Zhu Quan, the 17th son of the founder of the Ming dynasty. In the 1960s, Zha Fuxi discovered more than 130 qinpu that contain well over 3360 pieces of written music. Sadly, many qinpu compiled before the Ming dynasty are now lost, and many pieces have remained unplayed for hundreds of years.

== Development ==
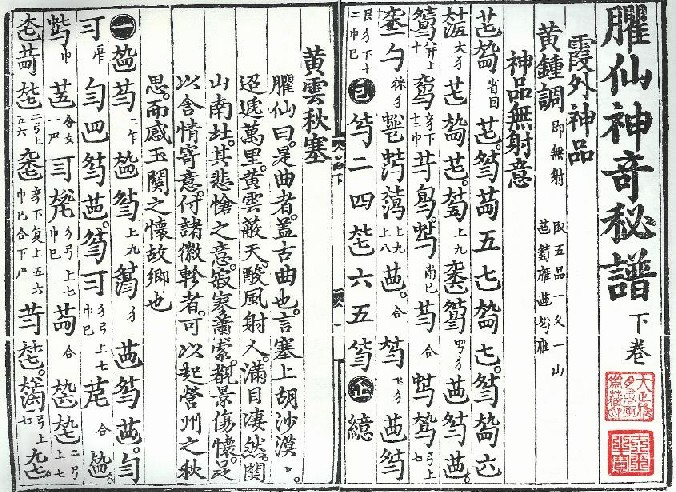
First page / leaf of volume 3 of Shenqi Mipu. From right to left: Full title of tablature collection 【臞仙神奇秘譜】 with volume number 下卷 (lower or third) plus seals of the owner of this copy (if any), title of the volume 霞外神品, the tuning and method of tuning 〈黃鐘調〉, name of the 'modal preface' 〔調意〕, the tablature (shorthand) of the modal preface, [next page] title of the piece, description of the piece's origins, and the tablature of said piece.

Major changes in the tablature happened during the Qing period. Before, the recording of the note positions between hui were only approximations. For example, to play sol on the seventh string, the position the player must stop is between the 7th and 8th hui. The tablature of Ming times would only say "between 7 and 8" 「七八日(間)」 or for other positions "below 6" 「六下」 or even say "11" 「十一」 (when the correct position is slightly higher). During the Qing, this was replaced by the decimal system. The space between two hui were split into 10 'fen' 〔分〕, so the tablature can indicate the correct position of notes more accurately, so for the examples above, the correct positions are 7.6, 6.2 and 10.8 respectively. Some even went further to split one fen into a further 10 'li' 〔釐/厘〕, but since the distance is too minute to affect the pitch to a large degree, it was considered impractical to use. Some people argue that the old system is just as accurate as the new system when qin tuning theory is observed. Also, these old positions may actually conform to the rules of equally tempered music, with its pitches slightly flatter, such as in the case of 8 for 7.9 and 11 for 10.8. Another main property for this old system is that it requires the player to "feel for the note", just as one would do for any other fretless stringed instrument, be it erhu or violin, instead of relying solely on fixed positions (which pitches can change slightly depending on how the player tunes their qin).

Existing qinpu generally come from private collections or in public libraries throughout China, etc. Those that are available for public purchase are facsimile qinpu printed and bound in the traditional Chinese bookbinding process. More modern qinpu tend to be bound in the normal Western way on modern paper. The format uses qin notation with staff notation and/or jianpu notation.

=== Modern developments ===
A number of efforts have been made to further develop qin tablature. A book by Wang Guangqi (王光祈) uses Roman and Arabic numerals to express the information provided by qin tablature. The qin player, Gong Yi, developed a format using staff notation combined with some tablature marks. Others have tried to write a computer program that will do this. Chen Changlin, a Beijing-based computer scientist and qin player of the Min (Fujian) School, developed the first computer program to encode qin notation from ancient tablature sources.

The current practice for recording qin scores is to use jianzipu notation together with staff and/or cipher notation so the playing method is preserved and the rhythm, note value, etc. is also shown.

== See also ==
- Qinpu

== Footnotes ==
1. Zhu, Quan. Shenqi Mipu 【神竒秘譜】.
2. Zha, Fuxi. Cunjian Guqin Qupu Jilan 【存見古琴曲譜輯覽】. Pages 3–44.
3. Beijing Guqin Research Association. Beijing Qin-xun 【北京琴讯】. March 2001 (volume 71). Pages 1, 2 and 4.
4. Gong, Yi. Guqin Yanzhoufa 【古琴演奏法】. Pages 38–42.
5. Qin music notation web generator (2005) Project Title: Chinese music instrument: 'Qin' notation web generator (https://web.archive.org/web/20060901115131/http://web.pdx.edu/~candy/qin/index.html, archived from http://web.pdx.edu/~candy/qin/index.html, 29 July 2006)
