= Yang Pass =

Mountain pass in Gansu, China

Yangguan
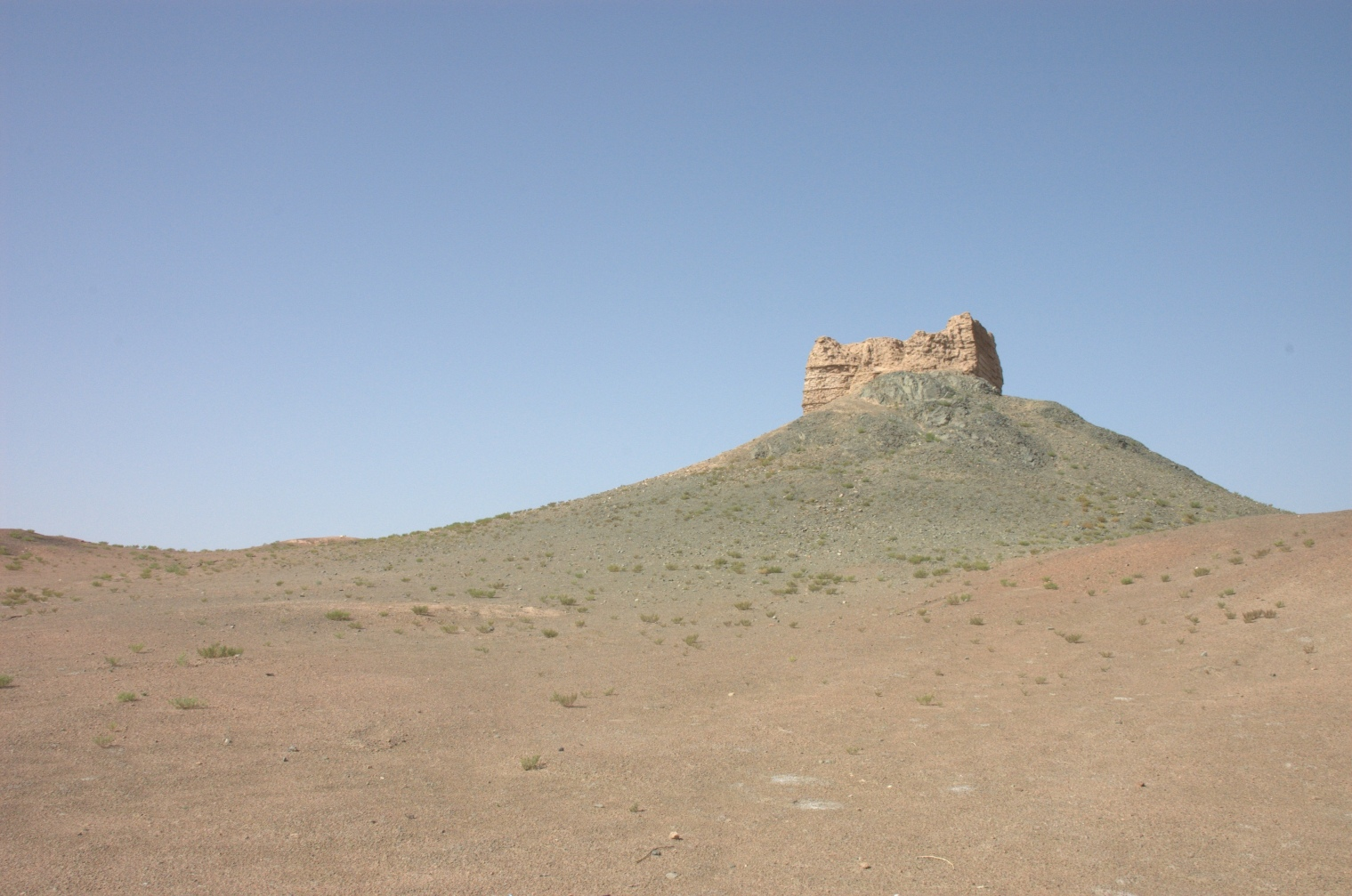
- The ruin of a tower on a hill at Yangguan

- Location within China

Third Approach
- Location: Gansu, China
- Coordinates: 39°55′38.1″N 94°3′32.5″E

Yang Pass
- Simplified Chinese: 阳关
- Traditional Chinese: 陽關
- Literal meaning: Sun Gate
Transcriptions

Yangguan, or Yangguan Pass (traditional Chinese: 陽關; simplified Chinese: 阳关; lit. 'Sun Gate'), is a mountain pass that was fortified by Emperor Wu of the Western Han dynasty around 120 BC and used as an outpost in the colonial dominions adjacent to ancient China. It is located approximately 70 kilometres (43 mi) southwest of Dunhuang, in the Gansu territory to the west of the Shaanxi province in the far Northwest China, which was in ancient times the westernmost administrative center of China. It was established as a frontier defense post, as well as a developed place in China's remote western frontier; Emperor Wu encouraged Chinese to settle there. Today Yangguan is located in Nanhu Village, along the Hexi Corridor.

Yangguan was one of China's two most important western passes, the other being Yumenguan. In Chinese, yang means "sun" or "sunny", but it can also be used to mean "south" (the sunny side of a hill being the southern side). Yangguan was therefore so-named because it lies to the south of the Yumenguan Pass. It was an important landmark on the Silk Road. The fortress at Yangguan however had fallen into ruin by around AD 900.

== Cultural references ==
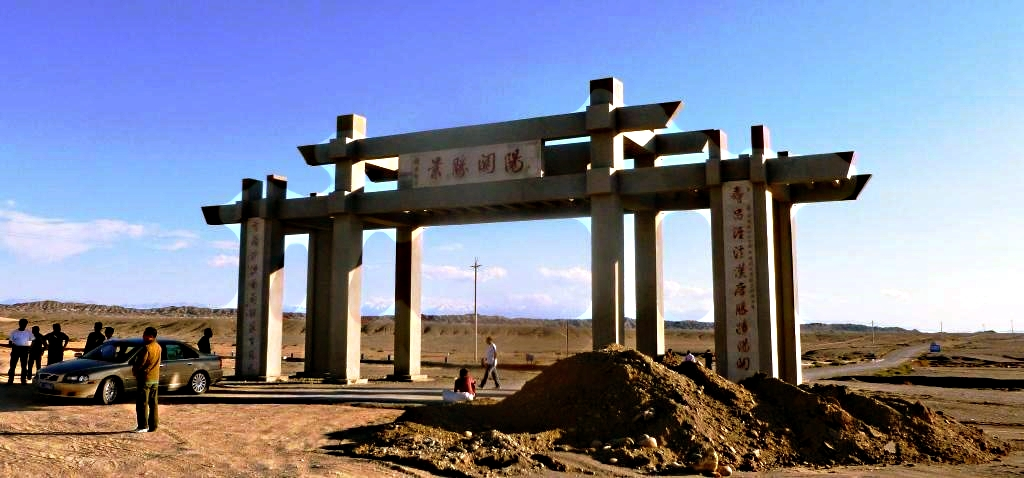
Tourist development near ancient Yangguan, 2011

Yangguan is associated with sad parting in Chinese literature as it was the last stop for Chinese travellers leaving China to the Western Regions. In a famous poem, "Seeing Yuan'er off on a Mission to Anxi", the Tang dynasty poet Wang Wei wrote:

送元二使安西

渭城朝雨浥輕塵，
客舍青青柳色新；
勸君更盡一杯酒，
西出陽關無故人。

Seeing Yuan'er off on a Mission to Anxi

The morning rain of Weicheng dampens the light dust,
The guest house is green with the colour of fresh willows.
Let's finish another cup of wine, my dear sir,
Out west past the Yangguan, old friends there'll be none.

Wang Wei's poem inspired one of China's best-known musical pieces, the "Three Variations of Yangguan" (Yangguan Sandie, traditional Chinese: 陽關三疊; simplified Chinese: 阳关三叠) which existed as early as the Tang dynasty. The song became a classic farewell song sung down the centuries, and additional lines were added by others to the song as refrains. The poem is repeated either in part or in whole three times, and each time with some variations. The earliest surviving music score dates back to the Ming dynasty. A current popular version is based on a late Qing dynasty tune; originally it was played on guqin and first published in Introduction to Learning Qin (琴學入門, Qinxue Rumen) in 1864, but it may be traced back to a version from the Ming dynasty. This version is also played on guanzi as well as other instruments, and has also been adapted for a vocal performance.
