= Jieshi Diao Youlan =

Guqin sheet music (6–7th centuries)

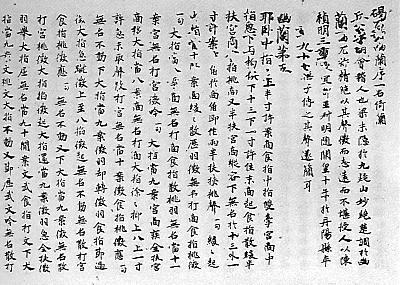
- First section of Jieshi Diao Youlan, which shows the name of the piece, the preface describing the piece's origins, and the tablature in longhand form.
- English: Solitary Orchid in the Stone Tablet Mode
- Native name: 碣石調幽蘭
- Period: 6–7th century, Tang dynasty
- Form: Wenzi pu
- Language: Chinese

Jieshi Diao Youlan (Chinese: 碣石調幽蘭; lit. 'Solitary Orchid in the Stone Tablet Mode') or just "Solitary Orchid" ("Secluded Orchid" or "Elegant Orchid" in some translations) is the name of a piece of Chinese music or melody for the guqin which was composed during the 6th or 7th century, with the earliest preserved text dating from the 7th century, and is probably the oldest surviving piece of written music in East Asia.

== History ==
The manuscript was written during the early Tang dynasty during the 7th century, and it is now found in Kyoto, Japan. It is believed to be a copy of an earlier manuscript and contains a lot of written 'corrections', mistakes and vagueness. Because it is damaged in some places, there has been much study into how it is played.

== Notation ==
The manuscript of Youlan is written in a special old form of guqin notation, known as wenzi pu (lit. "written character notation").

== Tonality ==
The melody is noted for its use of microtones, especially at the cadences at the end of each of its four sections when three tones between ti and do (and in the case of the third section, the halfway tone between ti and do is further divided) are used. This creates a mysterious effect that sounds modern to new listeners.
