= Qinpu =

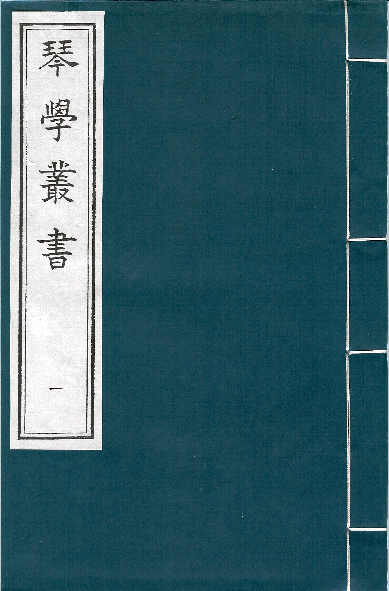
Front cover of the first folio of the facsimile of Qinxue Congshu

Qinpu (simplified Chinese: 琴谱; traditional Chinese: 琴譜; pinyin: qínpǔ; Jyutping: kam^{4} pou^{2}) are tablature score collections for the guqin, a Chinese musical instrument.

== Description ==
Qinpu are collections of tablatures of music for the guqin. In the past, music was passed on from teacher to student. Only recently has tablature been written down, often to preserve music or as a reference book. Tablature comes in form of individual pieces and collections. Collections often have explanations for fingering, background information, musical analyses, and other additional information attached to them.

=== Different types of qinpu ===
There are several different types of qinpu one can obtain.

- Original editions are qinpu printed at the original time of publication, or re-issues during the past. These are mostly kept in libraries and private collections. Since they are original, they tend to be fragile.
- Photographic reprints is basically a scan of the original qinpu and reduced size reprint in modern binding. The most famous is the Qinqu Jicheng.
- Lithographic facsimiles are becoming more popular. The original qinpu is scanned, then it is lithographically printed on xuan paper. They are bound in traditional Chinese book binding method.
- Modern reset editions appeared after 2005. These have modern typographic elements and are often reset using more recent editions or handcopies of original qinpu.

== See also ==
- Qin notation
