= Guqin =

Chinese stringed musical instrument

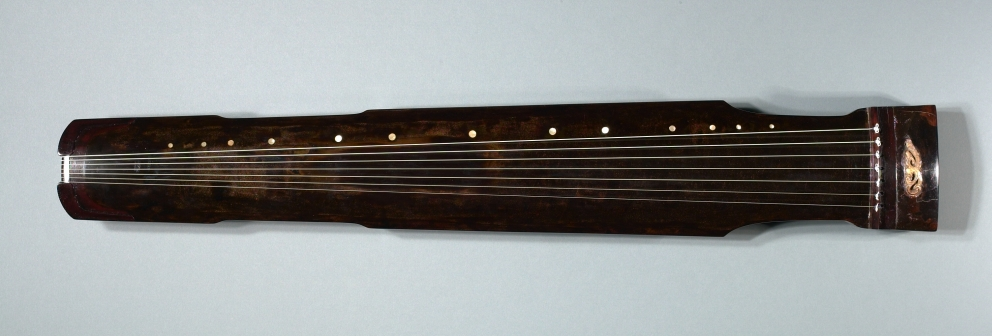

String instrument
- Other names: qin, ku-ch'in, qixian-qin
- Classification: String
- Hornbostel–Sachs classification: 312.22 (heterochord half-tube zither)
- Developed: 1st millennium BC or earlier
- Volume: quiet

Related instruments
- Ichigenkin, geomungo

Musicians
- See below

Chinese name
- Chinese: 古琴
- Literal meaning: ancient qin (a type of musical instrument)
Transcriptions
Standard Mandarin
- Hanyu Pinyin: gǔqín
- Wade–Giles: ku^{3}-ch'in^{2}
- IPA: [kùtɕʰǐn]
Yue: Cantonese
- Yale Romanization: gú-kàhm
Southern Min
- Tâi-lô: kóo-khîm
Middle Chinese
- Middle Chinese: gim
Old Chinese
- Baxter–Sagart (2014): *[C.ɢ](r)[ə]m

Guqin and its music
- UNESCO Intangible Cultural Heritage
- Country: China
- Reference: 61
- Region: Asia-Pacific region

Inscription history
- Inscription: 2003 (3rd session)
- List: Representative
- UNESCO Cultural Heritage

The qin (琴 pronounced [tɕʰǐn]), or later guqin ([kùtɕʰǐn]) after the 20th century (see terminology), is a plucked seven-string Chinese musical instrument. It has been played since ancient times, and has traditionally been favoured by scholars and literati as an instrument of great subtlety and refinement, as highlighted by the quote "a gentleman does not part with his qin or se without good reason," as well as being associated with the ancient Chinese philosopher Confucius. It is sometimes referred to by the Chinese as "the father of Chinese music" or "the instrument of the sages". The guqin is not to be confused with the guzheng, another Chinese long stringed instrument also without frets, but with moveable bridges under each string.

The guqin is a very quiet instrument, with a range of about four octaves, and its open strings are tuned in the bass register. Its lowest pitch is about two octaves below middle C, or the lowest note on the cello. Sounds are produced by plucking open strings, stopped strings, and harmonics. The use of glissando—sliding tones—gives it a sound reminiscent of a pizzicato cello, fretless double bass or a slide guitar. The qin has 13 hui (徽), which represent the different position in one string. Pressing different hui produces different sound keys. The qin is also capable of many harmonics, of which 91 are most commonly used and indicated by the dotted positions. By tradition, the qin originally had five strings, which represent gong, shang, jue, zhi, yu in the ancient Chinese music system, but ancient qin-like instruments with only one string or more strings have been found. The modern form has been stabilized to seven strings.

There are more than 3,360 known surviving pieces of guqin music from ancient and imperial periods. On 7 November 2003, UNESCO announced that the Chinese guqin was selected as an Intangible World Cultural Heritage. In 2006, guqin was listed in the List of National Non-material Cultural Heritage in China. In 2010, a Song period guqin was sold for $22 million, making it the most expensive musical instrument ever sold.

== Terminology ==
The Chinese logogram that represents the instrument 琴 by default in Chinese according to the 2nd century Shuowen Jiezi (theoretically read as *krɯm in Old Chinese) comes from its cross section side profile. By the twentieth century however, 琴 qin had encompassed a class to many other string instruments introduced to China over the ages like the hammered dulcimer (洋琴 yangqin "ocean [foreigners'] qin"), the huqin family of bowed string instruments, even extended to the Western piano (鋼琴 gangqin "steel qin") and violin (小提琴; xiaotiqin "small carriable qin"); thus the prefix gu- (古; "ancient") was later added for clarification becoming the guqin of today. It can also be called qixian-qin (七絃琴; 'seven-stringed qin').

Because Robert Hans van Gulik's book about the qin is called The Lore of the Chinese Lute, the guqin is sometimes inaccurately called a lute.

== History ==
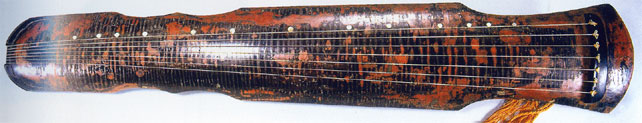
The Tang dynasty (618–907) qin, the "Jiu Xiao Huan Pei"

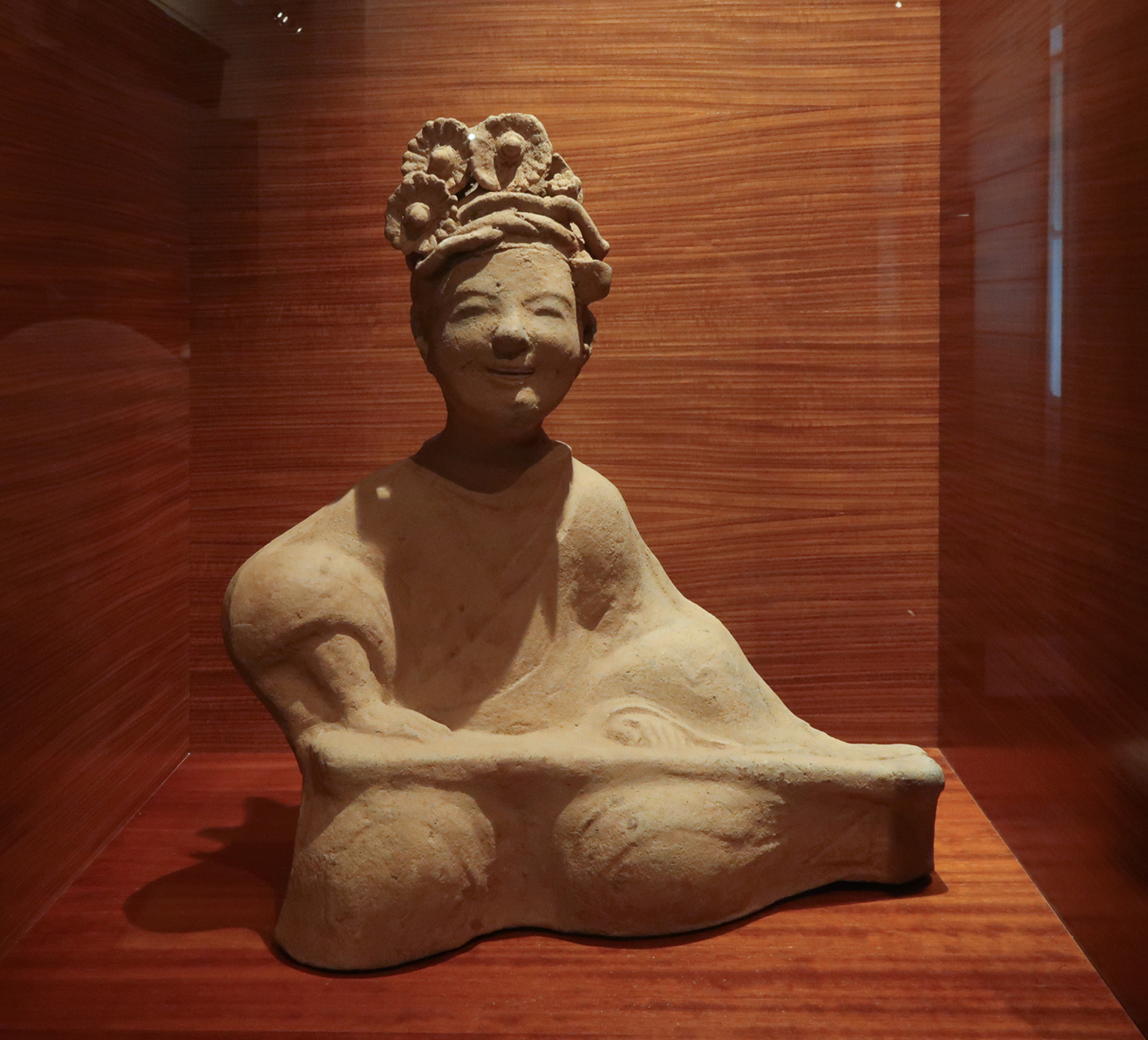
A girl playing a guqin, Eastern Han dynasty, collection of the Musée des Arts Asiatiques de Toulon, France

Legend has it that the qin, the most revered of all Chinese musical instruments, has a history of about 5,000 years, and that the legendary figures of China's pre-history – Fuxi; Shennong; and Huang Di, the "Yellow Emperor" – were involved in its creation. Nearly all qin books and tablature collections published prior to the twentieth century state this as the actual origins of the qin, although this is now viewed as mythology. It is mentioned in Chinese writings dating back nearly 3,000 years, and examples have been found in tombs from about 2,500 years ago. The exact origins of the qin is still a very much continuing subject of debate over the past few decades.

In 1977, a recording of "Flowing Water" (Liu Shui, as performed by Guan Pinghu, one of the best qin players of the 20th century) was chosen to be included in the Voyager Golden Record, a gold-plated LP recording containing music from around the world, which was sent into outer space by NASA on the Voyager 1 and Voyager 2 spacecraft. It is the second-longest excerpt included on the disc. The reason to select a work played on this specific instrument is because the tonal structure of the instrument, its musical scale, is derived from fundamental physical laws related to vibration and overtones, representing the intellectual capacity of human beings on this subject. In 2003, guqin music was proclaimed as one of the Masterpieces of the Oral and Intangible Heritage of Humanity by UNESCO.

== Schools, societies and players ==
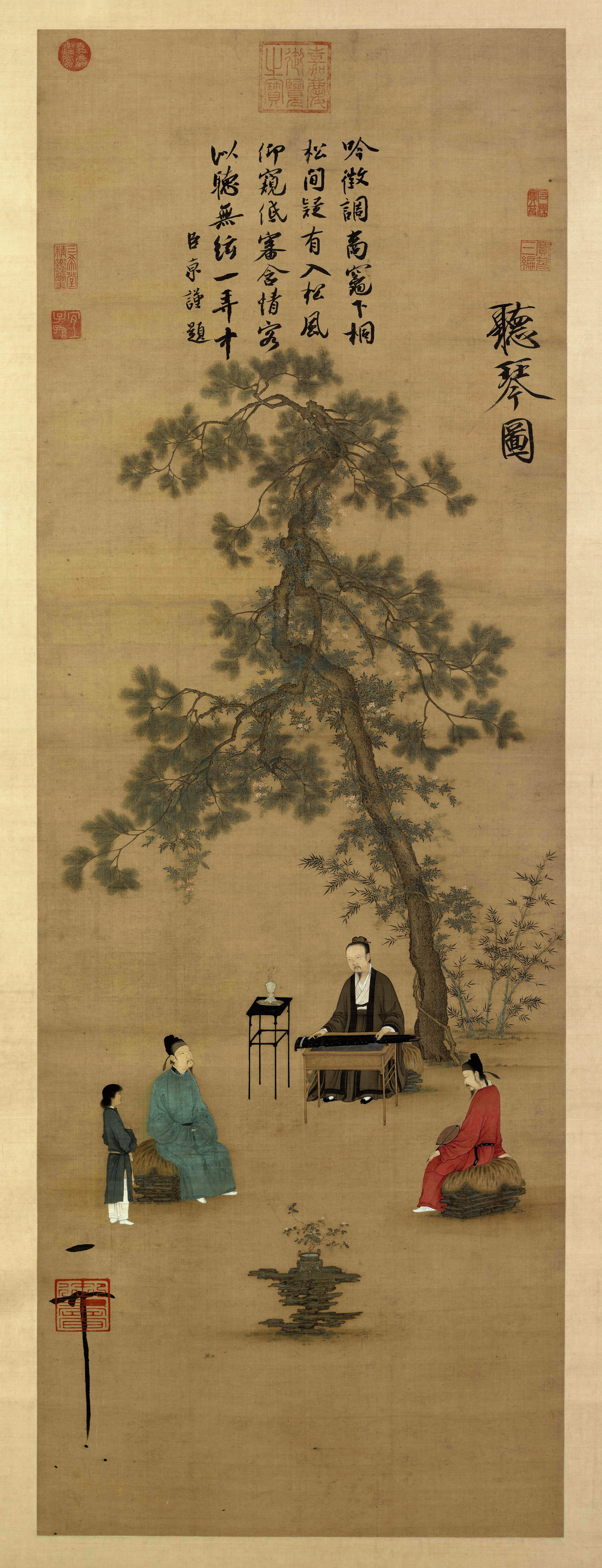
The painting "Ting Qin Tu" (Listening to the Qin), by the Song emperor Huizong (1082–1135)

Song dynasty painting Depiction of the Joyful Aspiration in Guqin and Story Telling by Liu Songnian

As with any other musical tradition, there are differences in ideals and interaction between different people. Therefore, there exist different schools and societies which transmit these different ideas and artistic traditions.

=== Historical schools ===
A qin school (琴派 qin pai in Chinese) is a school of guqin players that play in a style that is different from other styles.

People often talk about regional styles though less so now compared to the past. Guqin is highly individualistic so players' approaches will be very personal.

=== Guqin societies ===
There is a difference between qin schools and qin societies. The former concerns itself with transmission of a style, the latter concerns itself with performance. The qin society will encourage meetings with fellow qin players in order to play music and maybe discuss the nature of the qin. A gathering like this is called a yaji (雅集; 'elegant gathering'), and takes place once every month or two. Sometimes, societies may go on excursions to places of natural beauty to play qin, or attend conferences. They may also participate in competitions or research. Societies do not need strict structure to adhere to; they can operate on a leisurely basis. The main purpose of qin societies is to promote and play qin music. They create opportunities to network and learn to play the instrument, to ask questions and to receive answers.

=== Players ===
Many individuals through the ages have played the guqin, both occupationally and avocationally; however, it is often associated with literati or gentlemen in particular. Certain melodies are also associated with famous gentlemen like Confucius, Qu Yuan, Ouyang Xiu, and Su Shi, or with poems from the Classic of Poetry (shijing 詩經). Some emperors of China also had a liking to the qin, including the Song dynasty emperor Huizong, as clearly seen in his own painting of himself playing the qin in Ting Qin Tu (聽琴圖; "Listening to the Qin")

==== Historical ====
- Confucius: philosopher, 551–479 BCE, associated with the pieces Kongzi Duyi (孔子讀易) Weibian Sanjue (韦编三绝; 韋編三絕) and Youlan (幽兰; 幽蘭)
- Bo Ya: Qin player of the Spring and Autumn period, associated with the pieces Gao Shan (高山) and Liu Shui (流水)
- Zhuang Zi: Daoist philosopher of the Warring States period, associated with the pieces Zhuang Zhou Mengdie (莊周夢蝶) and Shenhua Yin (神化引)
- Qu Yuan (340–278 BCE): Poet of the Warring States period, associated with the piece Li Sao (離騷)
- Cai Yong: Han musician, traditionally attributed author of Qin Cao (琴操)
- Cai Wenji: Cai Yong's daughter, associated with the piece Hujia Shiba-pai (胡笳十八拍) etc.
- Sima Xiangru: Han poet, 179–117 BCE.
- Zhuge Liang (181–234): Chinese military leader in the Three Kingdoms, one legend has him playing guqin calmly outside his fort while scaring off the enemy attackers.
- Ji Kang: One of the Seven Sages of the Bamboo Grove, musician and poet, writer of Qin Fu (琴賦)
- Li Bai: Tang poet, 701–762.
- Bai Juyi: Tang poet, 772–846.
- Song Huizong: Song emperor famous for his patronage of the arts, had a Wanqin Tang (萬琴堂; "10,000 Qin Hall") in his palace.
- Guo Chuwang: Patriot at the end of the Song dynasty, composer of the piece Xiaoxiang Shuiyun (潇湘水云; 瀟湘水雲)

The classical collections such as Qin Shi, Qinshi Bu and Qinshi Xu include biographies of hundreds more players.

==== Contemporary ====
Contemporary qin players extend from the early twentieth century to the present. More so than in the past, such players tend to have many different pursuits and occupations other than qin playing. There are only a few players who are paid to exclusively play and research the guqin professionally and nothing else. Qin players can also be well-versed in other cultural pursuits, such as the arts. Or they can do independent research on music subjects. Often, players may play other instruments (not necessarily Chinese) and give recitals or talks.

== Performance ==
The note range of a qin

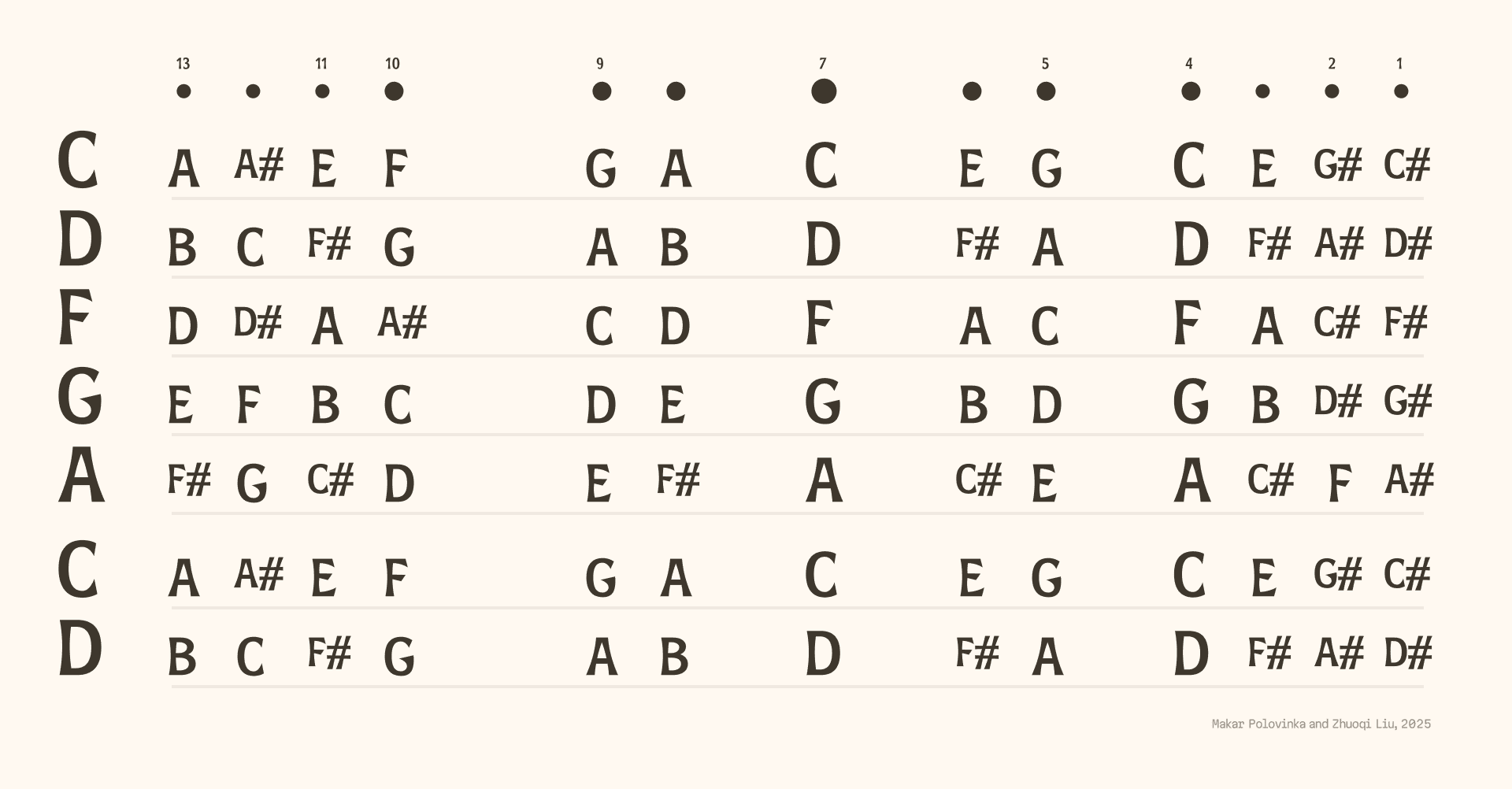
Guqin notes translated to Western letter notation. Letters on the left indicate open string notes, points on the top correspond to hui from 1 to 13

During the performance of qin, musicians may use a variety of techniques to reach the full expressing potential of the instrument. There are many special tablatures that had developed over the centuries specifically dedicated to qin for their reference and a repertoire of popular and ancient tunes for their choice.

=== Playing technique ===
The tones of qin can be categorized as three characteristic "sounds". The first type is san yin (散音), which literally means "unfettered sound". It's the fundamental frequency produced by plucking a free string with the fingers of the right hand. The second type, made by plucking a string with the right hand and gently tapping specific note positions on the string with the left hand, will create a crisp sound named fan yin (泛音; 'floating sound') or overtone harmonics (the equivalent technique in Western music is the string harmonic or flageolet). Important scale notes, called hui (徽), are marked by 13 glossy white dots made of mica or seashell inset in the front surface of the qin, occur at integer divisions of the string length. The "crystal concordant" (perfectly harmonic) overtones can only be evoked by tapping the strings precisely at these hui. The third type is an yin (按音/案音; 'pressed sound'), which is sometimes also called shi yin (實音; 'full sound') or zou yin (走音; 'changing sound'). These comprise the major cadences of most qin pieces. To play an yin, the musician stops a string at a specific pitch on the board surface with the left thumb, middle or ring finger, strikes the string with the right hand, then they may slide the left hand up and down to vary the note. According to the book Cunjian Guqin Zhifa Puzi Jilan, there are around 1,070 different finger techniques used for the qin. Thus the qin is possibly the instrument with the most playing techniques in both the Chinese and Western instrument families. Most of the qin's techniques are obsolete, but around 50 of them still appear in modern performance. Sometimes, guqin can be played with a violin bow. It has a tone similar to that of a cello, but raspier.

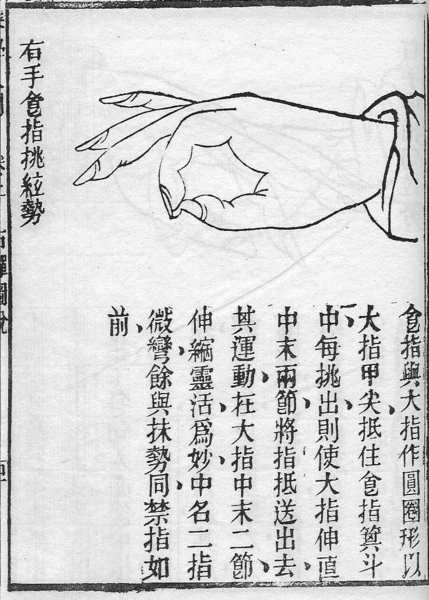
〈挑〉 Tiao

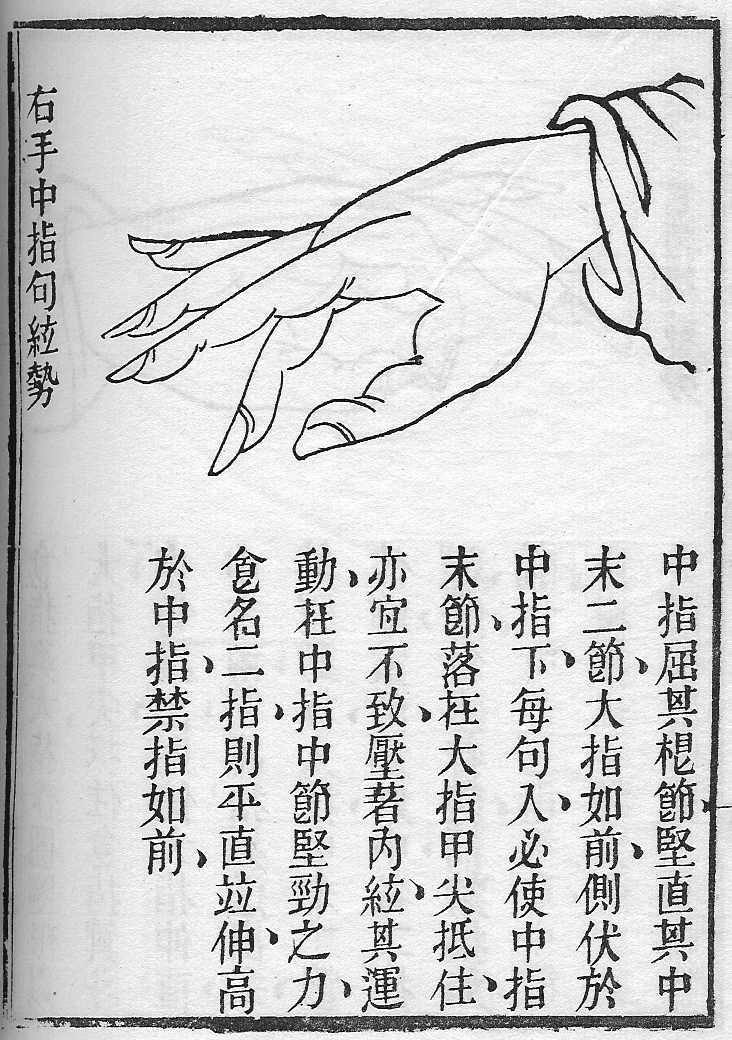
〈勾〉 Gou

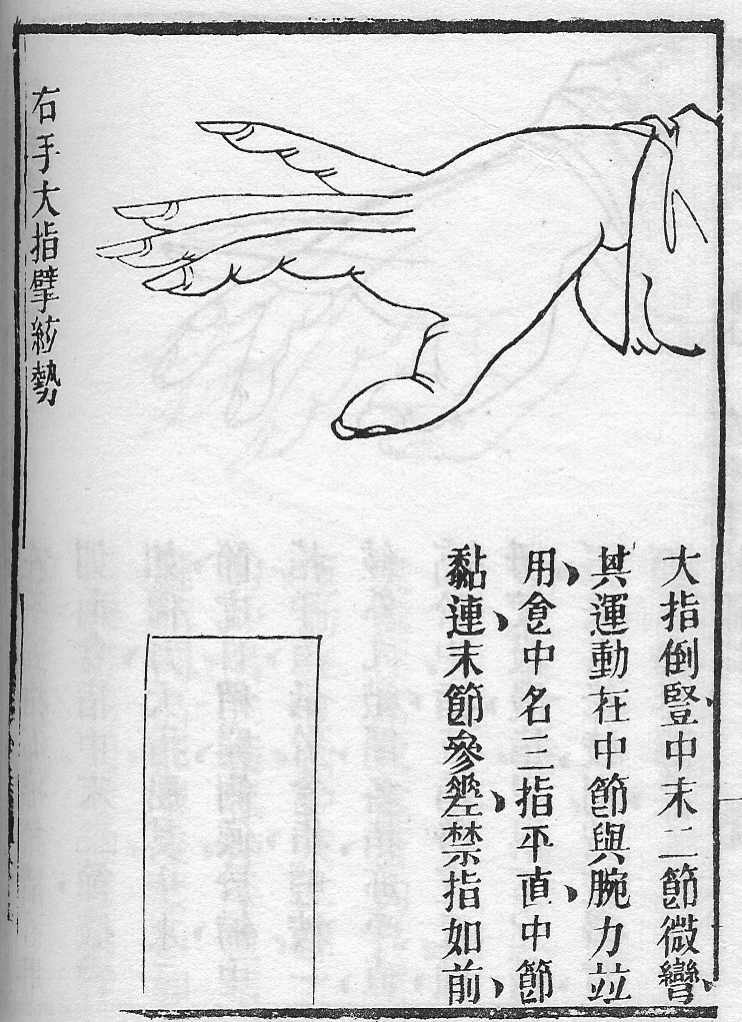
〈擘〉 Bo

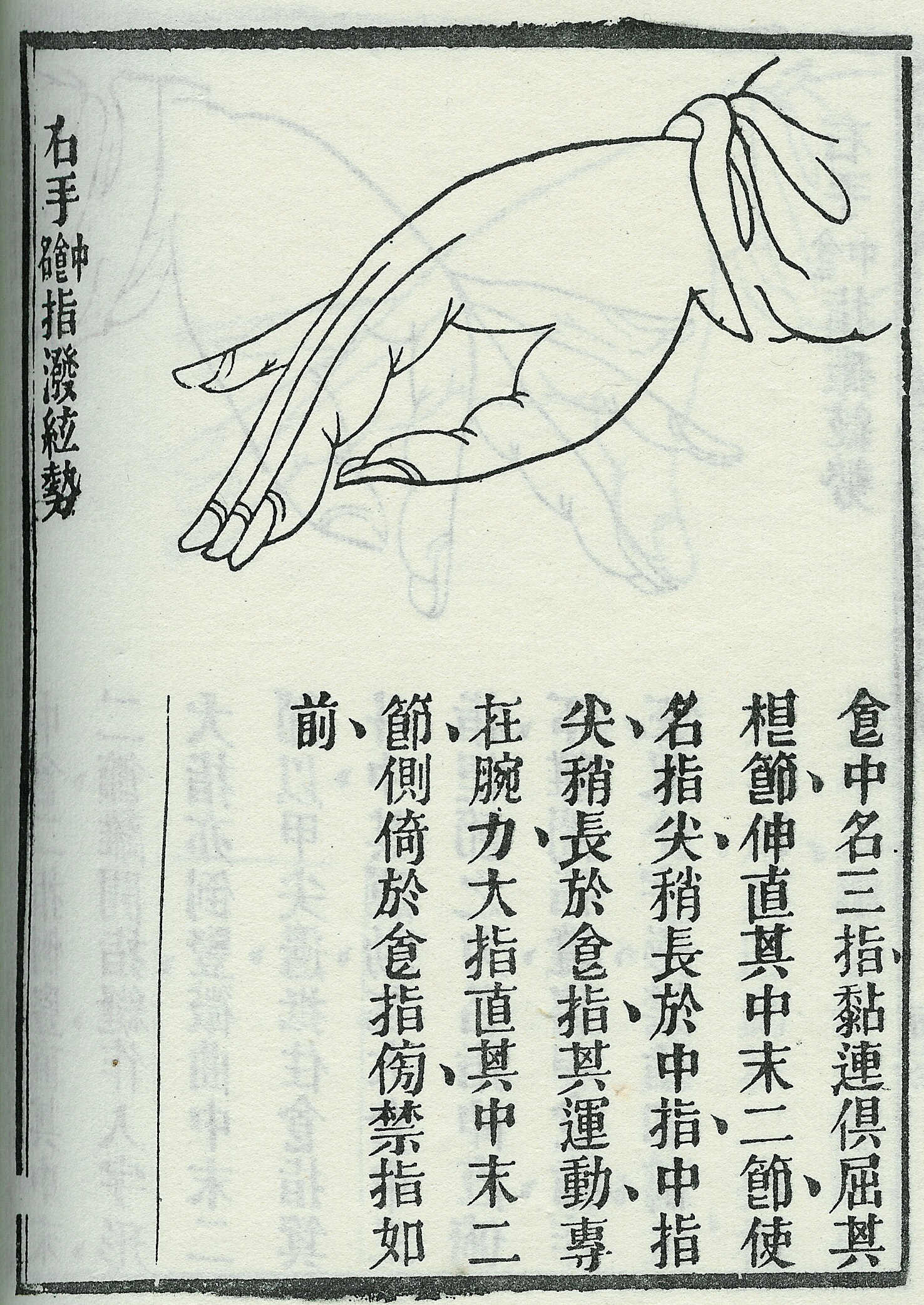
〈撥〉 Bo

The above four figures are from an old handbook.

=== Tablature and notation ===
The recordings below were made in 2013
Yangguan Sandie《陽關三疊》 "Three Refrains on the Yang Pass Theme"
From the Qinxue Rumen琴學入門 (1867)

Zuiyu Changwan《醉漁唱晚》 "Evening Song of the Drunken Fisherman"
From the Tianwen Ge Qinpu 天聞閣琴譜 (1876)

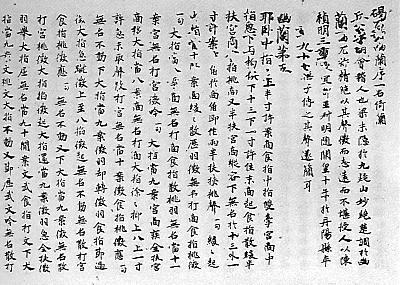
First section of Youlan, showing the name of the piece: "Jieshi Diao Youlan No.5", the preface describing the piece's origins, and the tablature in longhand form.

Written qin music did not directly tell what notes were played; instead, it was written in a tablature detailing tuning, finger positions, and stroke technique, thus comprising a step by step method and description of how to play a piece. Some tablatures do indicate notes using the gongche system, or indicate rhythm using dots. The earliest example of the modern shorthand tablature survives from around the twelfth century CE. An earlier form of music notation from the Tang era survives in just one manuscript, dated to the seventh century CE, called Jieshi Diao Youlan (碣石調幽蘭; "Solitary Orchid in Stone Tablet Mode"). It is written in a longhand form called wenzi pu (文字譜; 'written notation'), said to have been created by Yong Menzhou (雍門周) during the Warring States period, which gives all the details using ordinary written Chinese characters. Later in the Tang dynasty, Cao Rou (曹柔) and others simplified the notation, using only the important elements of the characters (like string number, plucking technique, hui number and which finger to stop the string) and combined them into one character notation. This meant that instead of having two lines of written text to describe a few notes, a single character could represent one note, or sometimes as many as nine. This notation form was called jianzi pu (減字譜; 'reduced notation') and it was a major advance in qin notation. It was so successful that from the Ming dynasty onwards, a great many qinpu (琴譜; "qin tablature collections") appeared, the most famous and useful being "Shenqi Mipu" (The Mysterious and Marvellous Tablature) compiled by Zhu Quan, the 17th son of the founder of the Ming dynasty. In the 1960s, Zha Fuxi discovered more than 130 qinpu that contain well over 3360 pieces of written music. However, many qinpu compiled before the Ming dynasty are now lost, and many pieces have remained unplayed for hundreds of years.

=== Repertoire ===
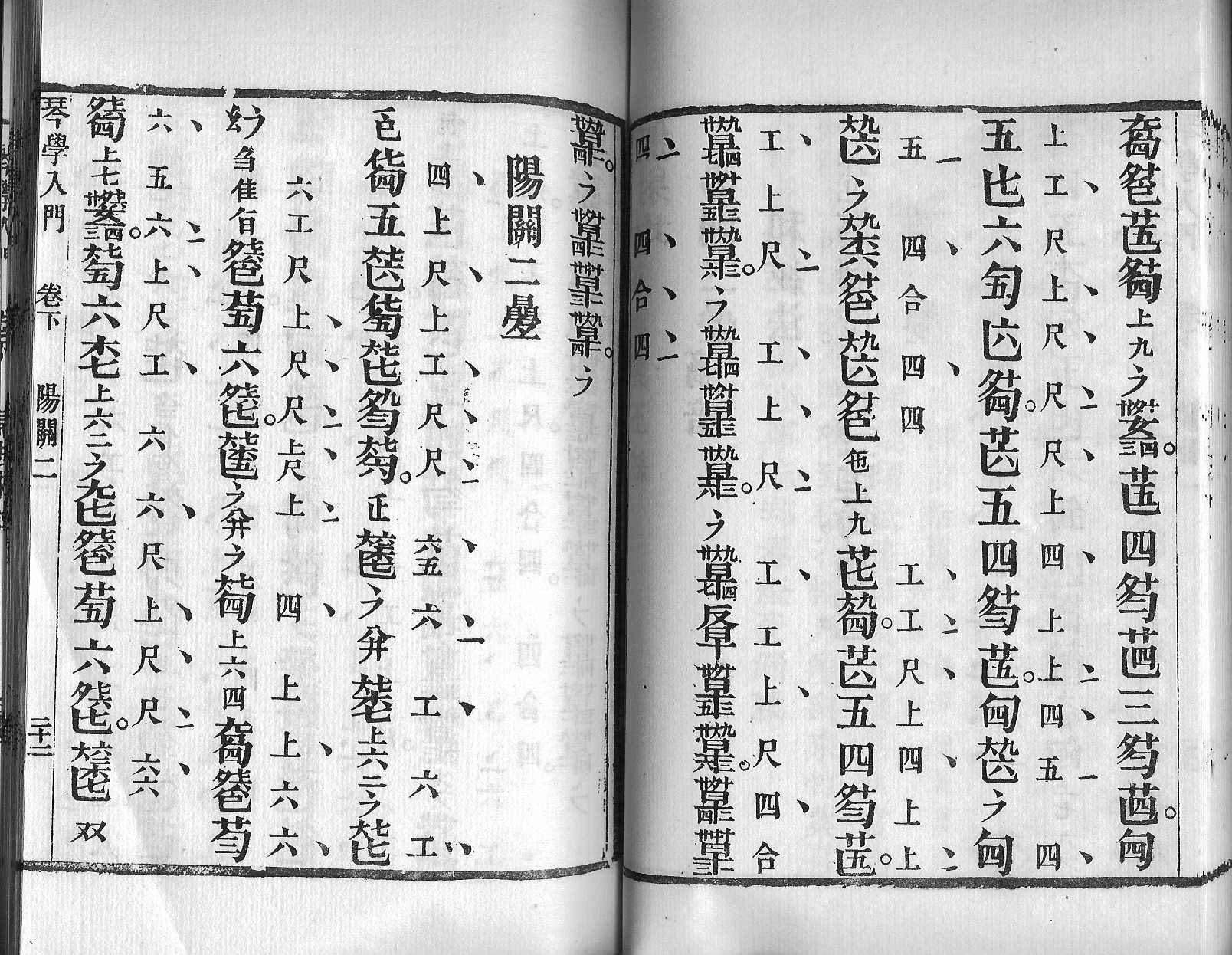
The Qinxue Rumen 琴學入門 (1864) tablature has dots and gongche notation next to the qin tablature to indicate beats and notes.

Qin pieces are usually around three to eight minutes in length, with the longest being Guangling San (廣陵散) which is 22 minutes long. Other famous pieces include Liu Shui (流水; "Flowing Water"), Yangguan San Die (阳关三叠; 陽關三疊; "Three Refrains on the Yang Pass Theme"), Meihua San Nong (梅花三弄; "Three Variations on the Plum Blossom Theme"), Xiao Xiang Shui Yun (瀟湘水雲; "Mist and Clouds over the Xiao and Xiang Rivers"), and Pingsha Luo Yan (平沙落雁; "Wild Geese Descending on the Sandbank"). The average player will generally have a repertoire of around ten pieces which they will aim to play very well, learning new pieces as and when they feel like it or if the opportunity arises. Players mainly learn popular well-transcribed versions, often using a recording as a reference. In addition to learning to play established or ancient pieces very well, highly skilled qin players may also compose or improvise, although the player must be very good and extremely familiar with the instrument to do this successfully. A number of qin melodies are program music depicting the natural world.

==== Transcription ====
Dapu (打譜) is the transcribing of old tablature into a playable form. Since qin tablature does not indicate note value, tempo or rhythm, the player must work it out for themselves. Normally, qin players will learn the rhythm of a piece through a teacher or master. They sit facing one another, with the student copying the master. The tablature will only be consulted if the teacher is not sure of how to play a certain part. Because of this, traditional qinpu do not indicate them (though near the end of the Qing dynasty, a handful of qinpu had started to employ various rhythm indicating devices, such as dots). If one did not have a teacher, then one had to work out the rhythm by themselves. But it would be a mistake to assume that qin music is devoid of rhythm and melody. By the 20th century, there had been attempts to try to replace the jianzi pu notation, but so far, it has been unsuccessful; since the 20th century, qin music is generally printed with staff notation above the qin tablature. Because qin tablature is so useful, logical, easy, and the fastest way (once the performer knows how to read the notation) of learning a piece, it is invaluable to the qin player and cannot totally be replaced (just as staff notation cannot be replaced for Western instruments, because they developed a notation system that suited the instruments well).

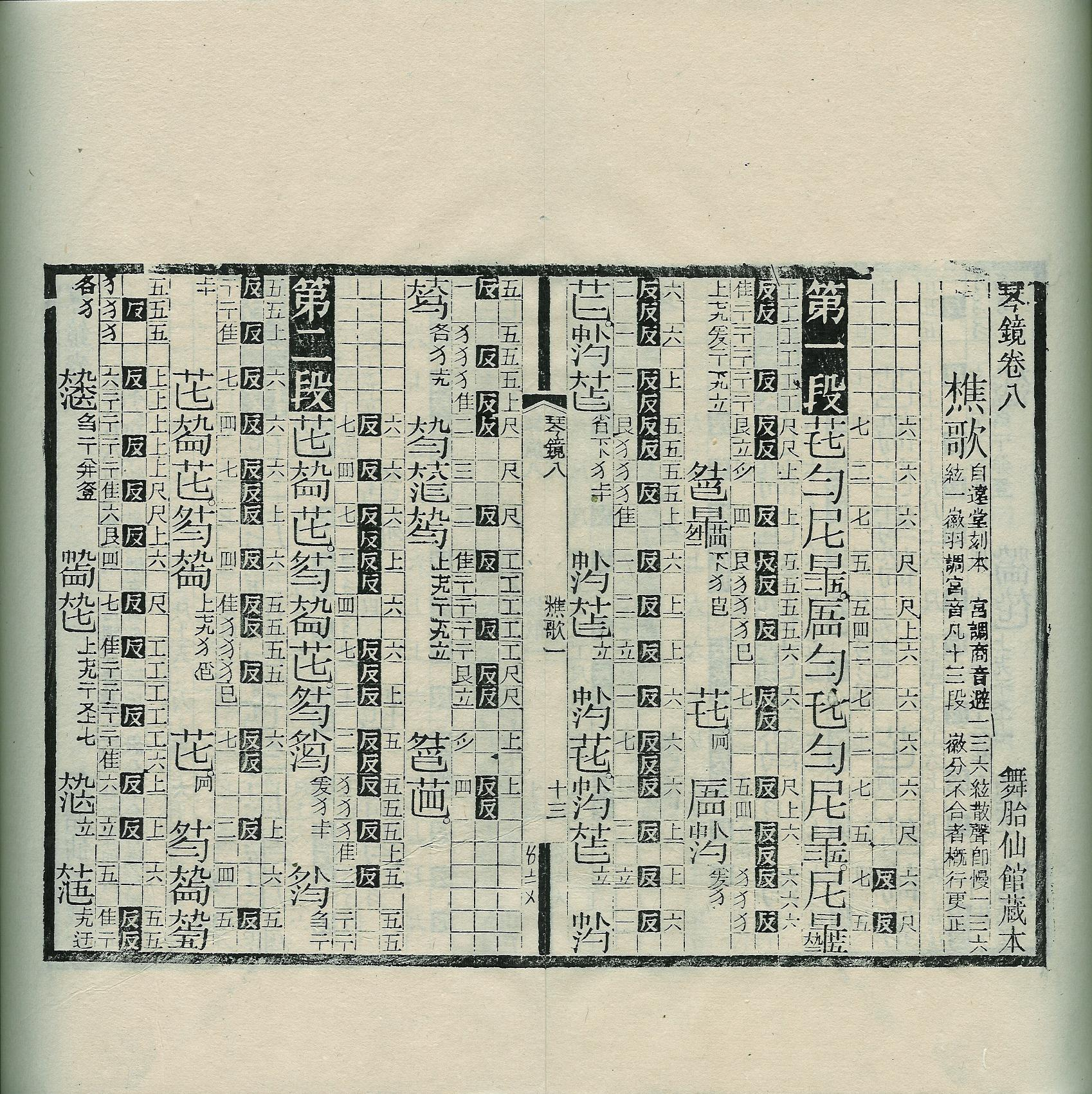
The Qinxue Congshu 【琴學叢書】 (1910) uses a more detailed system involving a grid next to main qin notation; right grid line indicates note, middle indicates the beat, left indicates how the qin tablature relates to the rhythm.

There is a saying that goes "a short piece requires three months [of dapu to complete], and a long piece requires three years". In actual practice, it needn't be that long to dapu a piece, but suggests that the player will have not only memorised the piece off by heart, but also have their fingering, rhythm and timing corrected. And afterwards, the emotion must be put into the piece. Therefore, it could be said that it really does require three months or years to finish dapu of a piece in order for them to play it to a very high standard.

==== Rhythm in qin music ====
It has already been discussed that qin music has a rhythm and that it is only vaguely indicated in the tablature. Though there is an amount of guesswork involved, the tablature has clues to indicate rhythm, such as repeating motifs, an indication of phrases or how the notation is arranged. Throughout the history of the qinpu, we see many attempts to indicate this rhythm more explicitly, involving devices like dots to make beats. Probably, one of the major projects to regulate the rhythm to a large scale was the compilers of the Qinxue Congshu tablature collection of the 1910s to 1930s. The construction of the written tablature was divided into two columns. The first was further divided into about three lines of a grid, each line indicating a varied combination of lyrics, gongche tablature, se tablature, pitch, and/or beats depending on the score used. The second column was devoted to qin tablature.

Western composers have noticed that the rhythm in a piece of qin music can change; once they seem to have got a beat, the beats change. This is due to the fact that qin players may use some free rhythm in their playing. Whatever beat they use will depend on the emotion or the feeling of the player, and how they interpret the piece. However, some melodies have sections of fixed rhythm which are played the same way generally. The main theme of Meihua Sannong, for example, uses this. Some sections of certain melodies require the player to play faster with force to express the emotion of the piece. Examples include the middle sections of Guangling San and Xiaoxiang Shuiyun. Other pieces, such as Jiu Kuang has a fixed rhythm throughout the entire piece.

== Organology ==
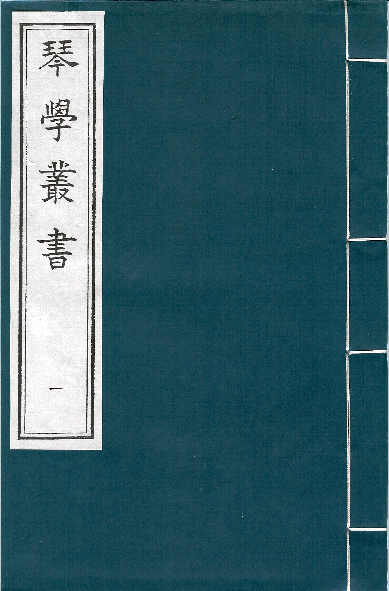
A qin tablature collection "Qinxue Congshu"

While acoustics dictated the general form and construction of the guqin, its external form could and did take on a huge amount of variation, whether it be from the embellishments or even the basic structure of the instrument. Qin tablatures from the Song era onwards have catalogued a plethora of qin forms. All, however, obey very basic rules of acoustics and symbolism of form. The qin uses strings of silk or metal-nylon and is tuned in accordance to traditional principles.

Ancient guqins were made of little more than wood and strings of twisted silk. Ornaments included inlaid dots of mother-of-pearl or other similar materials. Traditionally, the soundboard was made from paulownia, Chinese fir (Cunninghamia lanceolata), or wood from the Chinese parasol tree (Firmiana simplex), its rounded shape symbolising Heaven. The bottom was usually made of Chinese catalpa, Catalpa ovata, its flat shape symbolising Earth. Modern instruments are most frequently made of Cunninghamia or other similar timbers. The traditional finish is of raw lacquer mixed with powdered deer horn, and the finishing process could take months of curing to complete. The finish develops cracks over time, and these cracks are believed to improve the instrument's sound as the wood and lacquer release tension. An antique guqin's age can be determined by this snake like crack pattern called duanwen (斷紋).

=== Construction ===
According to tradition, the qin originally had five strings, representing the five elements of metal, wood, water, fire and earth. Later, in the Zhou dynasty, Zhou Wen Wang added a sixth string to mourn his son, Boyikao. His successor, Zhou Wu Wang, added a seventh string to motivate his troops into battle with the Shang. The thirteen hui (徽) on the surface represent the 13 months of the year (the extra 13th is the 'leap month' in the lunar calendar). The surface board is round to represent Heaven and the bottom board flat to represent the earth. The entire length of the qin (in Chinese measurements) is 3 chi, 6 cun and 5 fen (三尺六寸五分) representing the 365 days of the year. Each part of the qin has meaning, some more obvious, like "dragon pool" (龙池; 龍池) and "phoenix pond" (凤沼; 鳳沼).

Names of (from left to right) the front, inside and back parts of the qin

=== Strings ===
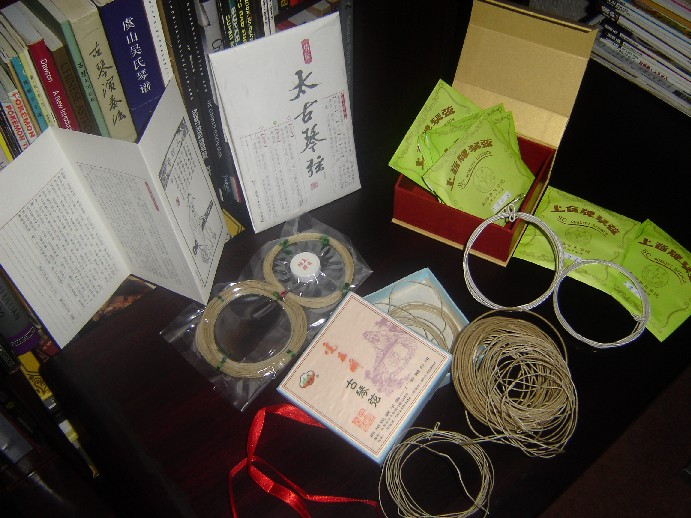
A selection of different qin strings. Top to bottom: (太古琴絃) Taigu Silk Qin Strings (中清 zhongqing gauge) with a container of 'string gum' (絃膠), (上音牌琴弦) Shangyin Shanghai Conservatorie Quality Qin Strings (metal-nylon), (虎丘古琴絃) Huqiu Silk Strings

Until recently, the guqin's strings were always made of various thicknesses of twisted silk, but since then most players use modern nylon-flatwound steel strings. This was partly due to the scarcity of high-quality silk strings and partly due to the newer strings' greater durability and louder tone.

Silk strings are made by gathering a prescribed number of strands of silk thread, then twisting them tightly together. The twisted cord of strings is then wrapped around a frame and immersed in a vat of liquid composed of a special mixture of natural glue that binds the strands together. The strings are taken out and left to dry, before being cut into the appropriate length. The top thicker strings (i.e., strings one to four) are further wrapped in a thin silk thread, coiled around the core to make it smoother. According to ancient manuals, there are three distinctive gauges of thickness that one can make the strings. The first is taigu (太古; 'Great Antiquity') which is the standard gauge, the zhongqing (中清; 'Middle Clarity') is thinner, whilst the jiazhong (加重; 'Added Thickness') is thicker. According to the Yugu Zhai Qinpu, zhongqing is the best. The currently used silk string gauge standard was defined by Suzhou silk string maker Pan Guohui (潘國輝).

Although most contemporary players use nylon-wrapped metal strings, some argue that nylon-wrapped metal strings cannot replace silk strings for their refinement of tone. Additionally, nylon-wrapped metal strings can cause damage to the wood of old qins. Many traditionalists feel that the sound of the fingers of the left hand sliding on the strings to be a distinctive feature of qin music. The modern nylon-wrapped metal strings were very smooth in the past, but are now slightly modified in order to capture these sliding sounds.

Around 2007, a new type of strings were produced made of mostly a nylon core coiled with nylon like the metal-nylon strings, possibly in imitation of Western catgut strings. The sound is similar to the metal-nylon strings but without the metallic tone to them (one of the main reasons why traditionalists do not like the metal-nylon strings). The nylon strings can be tuned to standard pitch without breaking and can sustain their tuning whatever the climate, unlike silk. The strings have various names in China, but they are advertised as sounding like silk strings prior to the 1950s, when silk string production stopped.

Traditionally, the strings were wrapped around the goose feet (雁足) but a device has been invented, which is a block of wood attached to the goose feet, with pins similar to those used to tune the guzheng protruding out at the sides, so one can string and tune the qin using a tuning wrench.

== Tuning ==
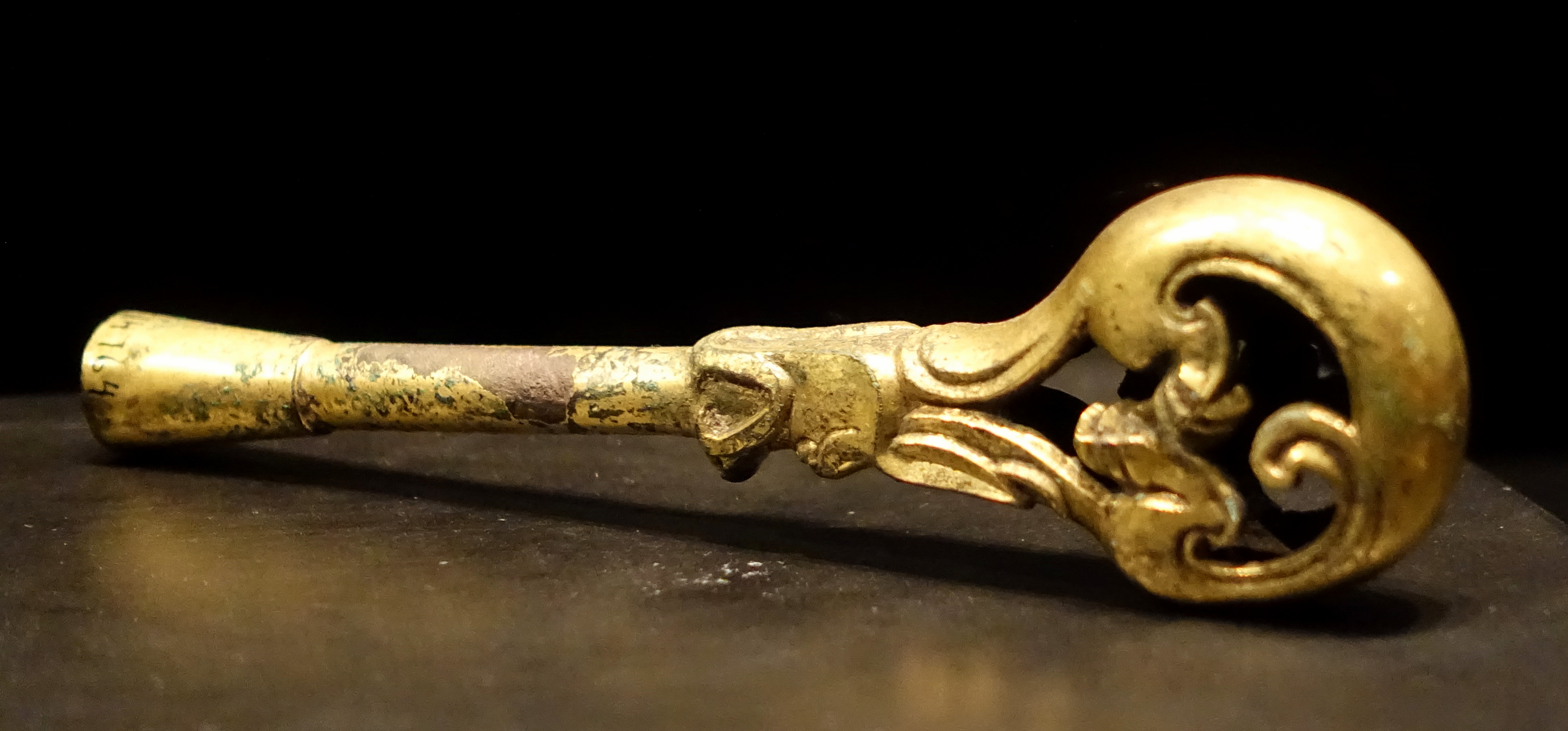
A tuning key for the guqin from the Han dynasty, collection of the Östasiatiska Museet, Stockholm, Sweden

To string a guqin, one traditionally had to tie a fly's head knot (蝇头结; 蠅頭結; yingtou jie) at one end of the string, and slip the string through the twisted cord (绒扣; 絨剅; rongkou) which goes into holes at the head of the qin and then out the bottom through the tuning pegs (轸; 軫; zhen). The string is dragged over the bridge (岳山; yueshan), across the surface board, over the nut (龍齦; longyin; "dragon gums") to the back of the qin, where the end is wrapped around one of two legs (鳳足; fengzu; "phoenix feet" or 雁足; yanzu; "geese feet"). Afterwards, the strings are fine-tuned using the tuning pegs (sometimes, rosin is used on the part of the tuning peg that touches the qin body to stop it from slipping, especially if the qin is tuned to higher pitches). The most common tuning, zheng diao (正調), is pentatonic: 5 6 1 2 3 5 6 (which can be also played as 1 2 4 5 6 1 2) in the traditional Chinese number system or 简谱; 簡譜; jianpu (i.e. 1=do, 2=re, etc.). Today this is generally interpreted to mean C D F G A c d, but this should be considered sol la do re mi sol la, since historically the qin was not tuned to absolute pitch. Other tunings are achieved by adjusting the tension of the strings using the tuning pegs at the head end. Thus manjiao diao (慢角調; "slackened third string") gives 1 2 3 5 6 1 2 and ruibin diao (蕤宾调; 蕤賔調; "raised fifth string") gives 1 2 4 5 7 1 2, which is transposed to 2 3 5 6 1 2 3.

== Playing context ==
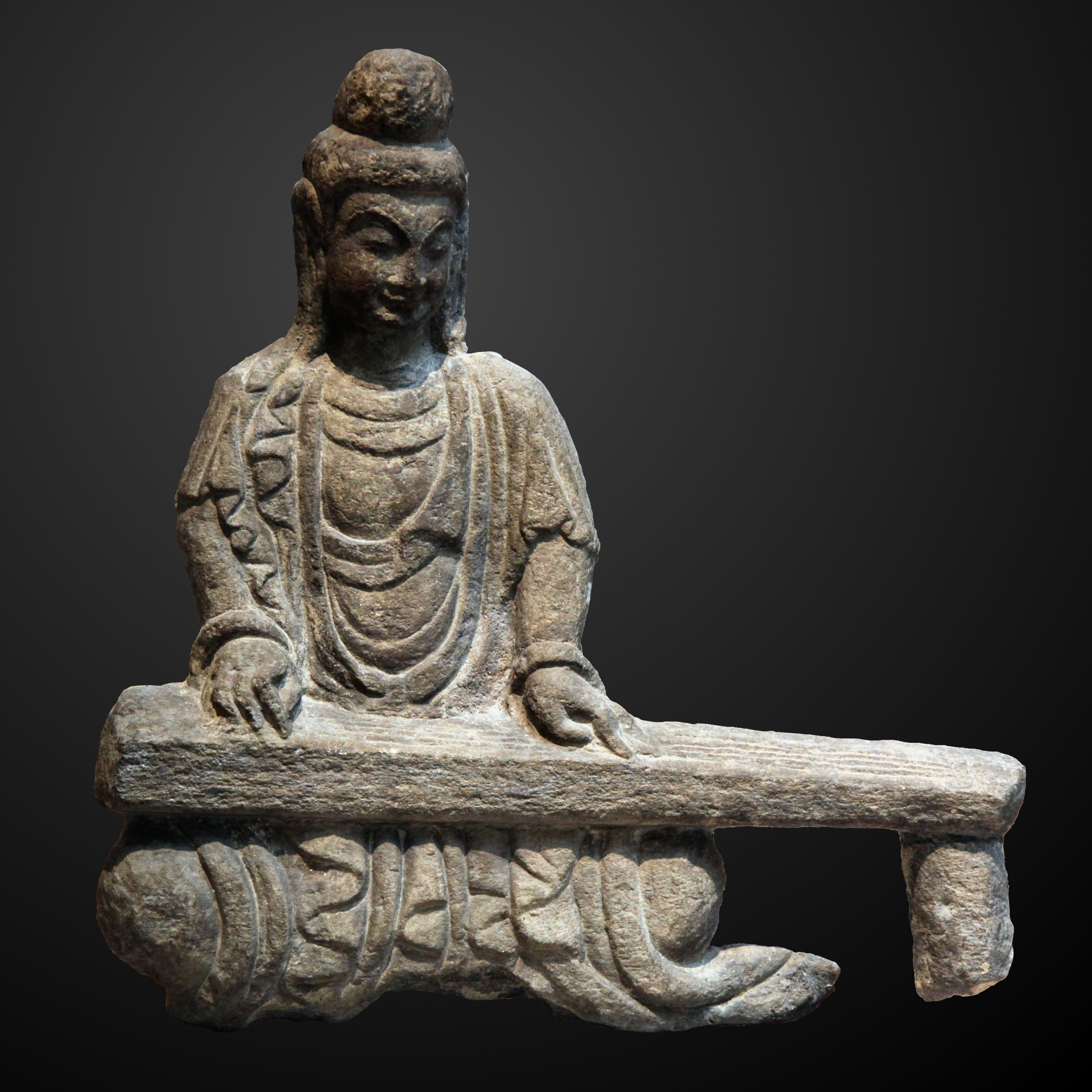
Rock carving of a bodhisattva playing a guqin, found in Shanxi, Northern Wei dynasty (386–534)

The guqin is nearly always played as a solo instrument since its quietness of tone means that it cannot compete with the sounds of most other instruments or an ensemble. It can, however, be played together with a xiao (end-blown bamboo flute), with other qin, or played while singing. In old times, the se (a long zither with movable bridges and 25 strings) was frequently used in duets with the qin. However, the se has not survived, though duet tablature scores for the instruments are preserved in a few qinpu, and the qin player Wu Jinglüe was one of only a few in the twentieth century who knew how to play it together with qin in duet. Lately there has been a trend to use other instruments to accompany the qin, such as the xun (ceramic ocarina), pipa (four-stringed pear-shaped lute), dizi (transverse bamboo flute), and others for more experimental purposes.

In order for an instrument to accompany the qin, its sound must be mellow and not overwhelm the qin. Thus, the xiao generally used for this purpose is one pitched in the key of F, known as qin xiao (琴簫), which is narrower than an ordinary xiao. If one sings to qin songs (which is rare nowadays) then one should not sing in an operatic or folk style as is common in China, but rather in a very low pitched and deep way; and the range in which one should sing should not exceed one and a half octaves. The style of singing is similar to that used to recite Tang poetry. In order fully to appreciate qin songs, one needs to become accustomed to the eccentric singing style adopted by certain players of the instrument, such as Zha Fuxi.

Traditionally, the qin was played in a quiet studio or room by oneself, or with a few friends; or played outdoors in places of outstanding natural beauty. Nowadays, many qin players perform at concerts in large concert halls, almost always, out of necessity, using electronic pickups or microphones to amplify the sound. Many qin players attend yajis, at which a number of qin players, music lovers, or anyone with an interest in Chinese culture can come along to discuss and play the qin. In fact, the yaji originated as a multi-media gathering involving the four arts: qin, Go, calligraphy, and painting.

=== Ritual use of the qin ===
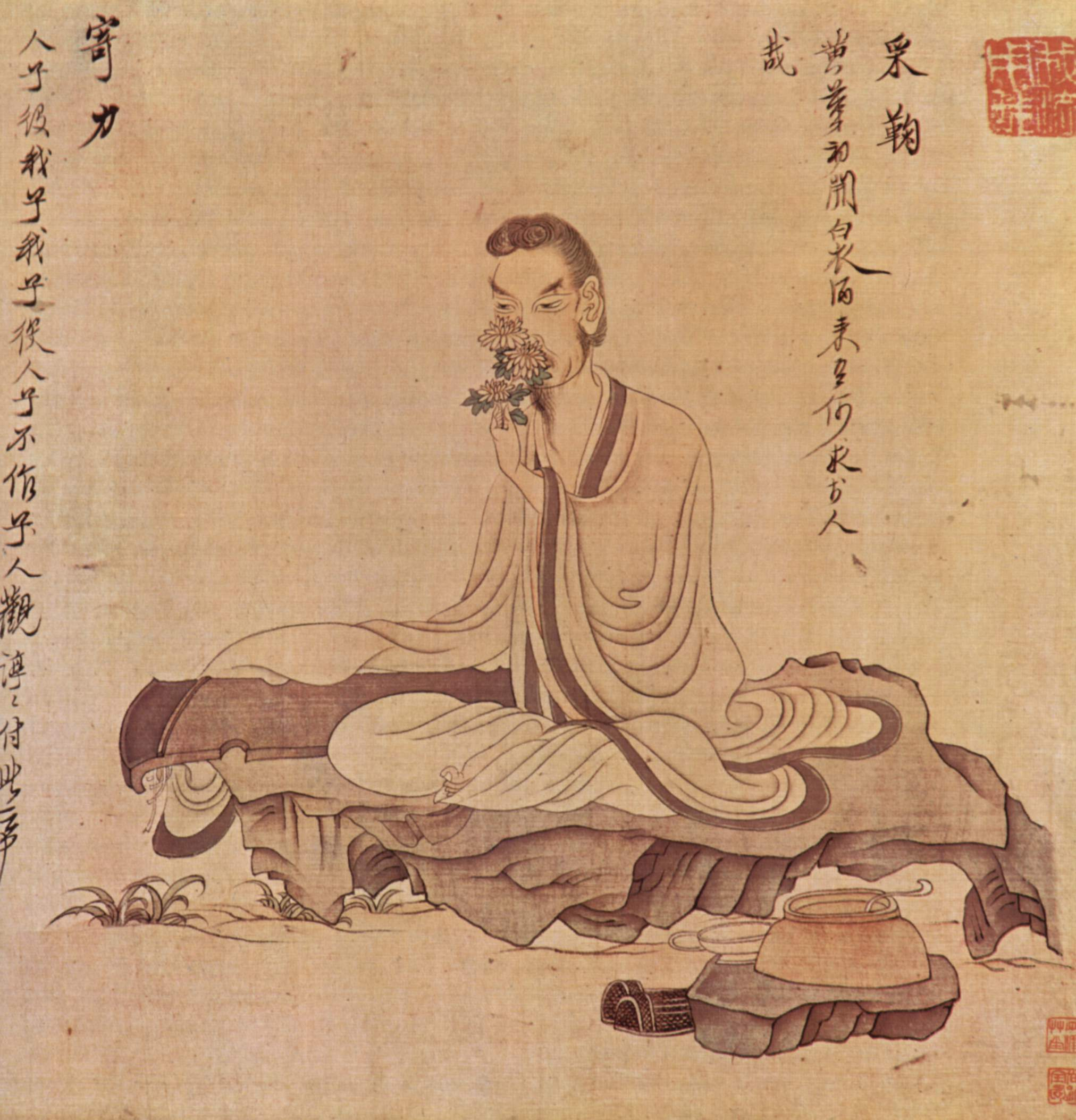
A painting by Chen Hongshou of a person with a qin

Being an instrument associated with scholars, the guqin was also played in a ritual context, especially in yayue in China, and aak in Korea.

The National Center for Korean Traditional Performing Arts continues to perform Munmyo jeryeak (Confucian ritual music), using the last two surviving aak melodies from the importation of yayue from the Song dynasty emperor Huizong in 1116, including in the ensemble the seul (se) and geum (금; qin). The Korean geum used in this context has evolved to be slightly different when compared to the normal qin in that there are 14 instead of 13 hui and that they are not placed correctly according to the harmonic positions besides other different construction features. The finger techniques are more closer to gayageum technique than it is to the complex ones of the qin. As the qin never gained a following in Korean society, the ritual geum became the fossilised form of it and to all intents and purposes unplayable for a qin player. The Korean scholars never adopted the qin but instead created their own instrument, the geomungo (玄琴), which adopted much of the qin's lore and aesthetics and essentially taking the qin's place as the scholars' instrument.

In China, the qin was still in use in ritual ceremonies of the imperial court, such can be seen in the court paintings of imperial sacrifices of the Qing court (e.g. 雍正祭先農壇圖; "The Yongzheng Emperor Offering Sacrifices at the Altar of the God of Agriculture", 1723–35). The qin also have many variations with a different number of strings, such as during Song Taizong's reign, but these variations never survived the changes of dynasty and so today the normal qin is used.

In Japan, the qin was never adopted into ritual music, but for a time in the late Edo period, the qin was adopted by some scholars and Buddhist monks. The guqin was later adjusted and adopted into general Japanese folk music as the koto (琴).

=== Qin aesthetics ===
When the qin is played, a number of aesthetic elements are involved. The first is musicality. In the second section of "Pingsha Luoyan", for example, the initial few bars contain a nao vibrato followed by a phase of sliding up and down the string, even when the sound has already become inaudible. The average person trained in music may question whether this is really "music". Normally, some players would pluck the string very lightly to create a very quiet sound. For some players, this plucking isn't necessary. Instead of trying to force a sound out of the strings one should allow the strings to emit the sounds to which they are naturally predisposed. Some players say that the sliding on the string even when the sound has disappeared is a distinctive feature in qin music. It creates a "space" or "void" in a piece, playing without playing, sound without sound. In fact, when the viewer looks at the player sliding on the string without sounds, the viewer automatically "fills in the notes" with their minds. This creates a connection between player, instrument and listener. This, of course, cannot happen when listening to a recording, as one cannot see the performer. It can also be seen as impractical in recording, as the player would want to convey sound as much as possible towards a third audience. But in fact, there is sound, the sound coming from the fingers sliding on the string. With a really good qin, silk strings, and a perfectly quiet environment, all the tones can be sounded. Since the music is more player-oriented than listener oriented, and the player knows the music, he/she can hear it even if the sound is not there. With silk strings, the sliding sound might be called the qi or "life force" of the music. The really empty sounds are the pauses between notes. However, if one cannot create a sound that can be heard when sliding on a string, it is generally acceptable to lightly pluck the string to create a very quiet sound.

== In popular culture ==
Xu Kuanghua playing an ancient qin in the film Hero

As a symbol of high culture, the qin continually appears in many forms of Chinese popular culture to varying degrees of accuracy. References are made to the qin in a variety of media including TV episodes and films. Actors often possess limited knowledge on how to play the instrument and instead, they mime it to a pre-recorded piece by a Qin player. Sometimes the music is erroneously mimed to guzheng music, rather than qin music. A more faithful representation of the qin is in the Zhang Yimou film Hero, in which Xu Kuanghua plays an ancient version of the qin in the courtyard scene while Nameless and Long Sky fight at a xiangqi parlour. It mimed the music played by Liu Li, formerly a professor at the Central Conservatory of Music in Beijing. It is suggested that Xu made the qin himself.

== Electric guqin ==
The electric guqin was first developed in the late 20th century by adding electric guitar–style magnetic pickups to a regular acoustic guqin, allowing the instrument to be amplified through an instrument amplifier or PA system.

== Related instruments ==
The Japanese ichigenkin, a monochord zither, is believed to be derived from the qin. The qin handbook Lixing Yuanya 理性元雅 (1618) includes some melodies for a one-string qin, and the Wuzhi Zhai Qinpu contains a picture and description of such an instrument. The modern ichigenkin apparently first appeared in Japan just after that time. However, the honkyoku 〔本曲〕 (standard repertoire) of the ichigenkin today most closely resembles that of the shamisen.

The Korean geomungo may also be related, albeit distantly. Korean literati wanted to play an instrument the way their Chinese counterparts played the qin. The repertoire was largely the geomungo parts for melodies played by the court orchestra.

== See also ==
- Contemporary guqin players
- Guqin aesthetics
- Guqin construction
- Guqin playing technique
- Guqin schools
- Guqin tunings
- Koto
- List of Chinese musical instruments
- Qinpu
- Se
- Yayue
