= Qin schools =

A qin school (琴派 qin pai in Chinese) is a school of guqin players that play in a style that is different from other styles.

People often talk about regional styles though less so now compared to the past. Guqin is highly individualistic so players' approaches will be very personal.

== Styles and schools ==
These are the main schools in China:

- Guangling (廣陵/广陵)
- Yushan (虞山 also known as Qinchuan (琴川) or Shu (熟)) in Changshu 常熟
- Shu (蜀 or Chuan (川)) in Sichuan 四川
- Zhucheng (諸城/诸城)
- Mei'an (梅庵/楳盦)
- Pucheng (浦城)
- Jiuyi (九嶷)
- Zhe (浙)
- Lingnan (嶺南/岭南) in Guangdong 廣東/广东
- Min (閩/闽) in Fujian 福建
- Shaoxing (紹興/绍兴)
- Wu (吳/吴)
- Shan'nan (山南)
- Songjiang (松江)
- Jinling (金陵)
- Fanchuan (泛川)

Today the three main centers of guqin are Beijing, the Jiangnan area (lower Yangtze valley, including Shanghai) and Sichuan (especially Chengdu). Most major masters as of the 1950s were located in Beijing or Jiangnan; before that, they had been more concentrated in Jiangnan. For instance, Zha Fuxi and Wu Jinglüe spent many years living and teaching in Jiangnan before being relocated to Beijing for official duties. "Regional styles" as of 50–60 years ago would be rather different from "regional styles" in the present day, owing to the importance of a few masters and the conservatories in Beijing and Shanghai. Presently, given the strength of the conservatory system, "northern and southern conservatory styles" probably deserve their own status, separate from the older regional styles.

== Regional styles ==
As far as older regional styles, the best-known ones are from Jiangnan and Sichuan. Some have relocated several times, like the Zhucheng/Mei'an style.

Major living Jiangnan lineages include Guangling, Zhe (Xumen) and Wumen. Others, like a "Jinling" style centered in Nanjing, don't really seem to exist anymore—though there's always an old master or two as counterexample.

1. For several generations the major qin lineage in Zhejiang has been surnamed Xu; Yao Bingyan and his tentative "Yaomen" lineage are an offshoot. One can't really say much about this style; it is not so well known, though several Xumen masters have been very respected.
2. In Suzhou there is the Wumen style, most associated with Wu Zhaoji and his teachers before him. "Wumen" is named after "Wu Place" (吳地, old Chinese name of Suzhou area), and Wu Zhaoji's legacy seems to define the school in large measure.
3. Guangling style is very prominent, mainly because it heavily influenced the "southern conservatory style". Guangling was originally centered in Yangzhou; its two major 20th century masters were Zhang Ziqian and Liu Shaochun. These taught a number of students destined for prominence, and Zhang himself became the de facto leading qin master in Jiangnan during the 1950s and 1960s. Major players today with strong Guangling influence include Gong Yi, Cheng Gongliang, Lin Youren, Mei Yueqiang, and their various students.

Generally (stereotypically), the Jiangnan styles are thought of as rather light and elegant. Guangling is very abstract, even "floating", and today the southern conservatory style is the more "light and elegant" of the conservatory styles.

=== Shu/Fanchuan school ===
Sichuan, as early as the Tang dynasty, was perceived as having qin play characterized by rushing, tumbling energy.

The modern form of the school was largely founded by Zhang Kongshan in the late 19th century; his inheritors have been very numerous. There are two branches: one branch through Ye Jiafu whose lineage is embodied by Zeng Chengwei, and the other is through Gu Yucheng whose lineage was embodied by Gu Meigeng. Today the main representative of the school is Zeng Chengwei, who has a very focused, straightforward style.

As the Sichuan style fanned out into other areas of China (as it seemed to do rather successfully in the early 20th century), it became known as "Fanchuan", whose connotation is something like "Chuan – Everywhere".

=== Zhucheng/Mei'an schools ===
These schools started in Shandong, with a lot of folk influence and energy. "Zhucheng" still refers to the sub-set of players who stayed in Shandong. Xu Lisun became the doyen of the "Mei'an" style when he moved to Nantong, in Jiangnan. From there he taught many of the living Jiangnan players, directly or indirectly. In addition, a student of his named Wu Zonghan moved to Taiwan (in 1949?) and has made Taiwan (and by extension Hong Kong) a major reservoir of Mei'an influence.

=== Other schools ===
Moving down the east coast of China, we have Fujian. The "Min" school, of which Chen Changlin calls himself an inheritor, seems largely dead today. In Guangdong there is the Lingnan school, whose major player is Xie Daoxiu. Much cannot be said about these, though Lingnan playing is very interesting.

Miniature "regional styles" abound and are gathered around particular important teachers. For instance, many in Hong Kong studied from Cai Deyun, who has a very distinctive style ultimately derived from Sichuan.

== Conservatory styles ==
From the early 20th century, as communication and travel within China improved as well as the adoption of modern musical teaching standards, a new conservatory style emerged. Typically, this style can be identified by the very precise and pitch-accurate play on the qin involving subtle vibrato on most notes and very fast movement of the hand and fingers. Whereas traditional styles are typically soft and fluid, conservatory style is very straight and sharp.

The "southern conservatory style" is basically what goes on at the Shanghai Conservatory where qin is concerned. A number of masters (including Zhang Ziqian, Wei Zhongle, Shen Caonong, Gu Meigeng, and others) taught there in the 1950s, and Gong Yi has been the doyen since then. He has numerous students; to some extent "southern conservatory style" reduces to "Gong Yi style", just like "Wumen" reduces to "Wu Zhaoji style". Gong Yi has very distinctive ideas and has done major interesting work.

Little is known about Beijing styles prior to the 1950s; the "big three" of mid-century Beijing all apparently had styles hailing from elsewhere. Guan Pinghu apparently based his playing on southern styles, though he studied with masters from all over; Wu Jinglüe and Zha Fuxi were both southerners. It's important to realize that there are lineages and micro-lineages and associations among all masters. For instance, there was some kind of long association between Zha Fuxi and Peng Qingshou (both from Hunan?) that may have been artistically productive. In any event, if there is a "Beijing style" today, it is largely the "northern conservatory style".

Northern conservatory style has two main representatives today: Li Xiangting and Wu Wenguang. The primary older masters contributing to the making of this style were Wu Jinglüe, Zha Fuxi, and Guan Pinghu. Generally, the northern conservatory style is heavier, harder, and more intense than the southern conservatory style. Li Xiangting is of course known for being very hard and athletic in his playing; Wu Wenguang, while rather lighter, still has a more intense and serious tone than Gong Yi.

== Individual style ==
On top of the regional and conservatory styles, there is the style which does not fit into either. This is the style that many qin players would play since they may either have been taught by numerous teachers and so do not have a main regional style, or are mostly self-taught. It is from this that some interesting and sometimes eccentric styles exist since there are no constraints from the expectation of peers or teachers.

== See also ==
- Qin societies
- Contemporary qin players
