= Contemporary guqin players =

List of contemporary players of the guqin

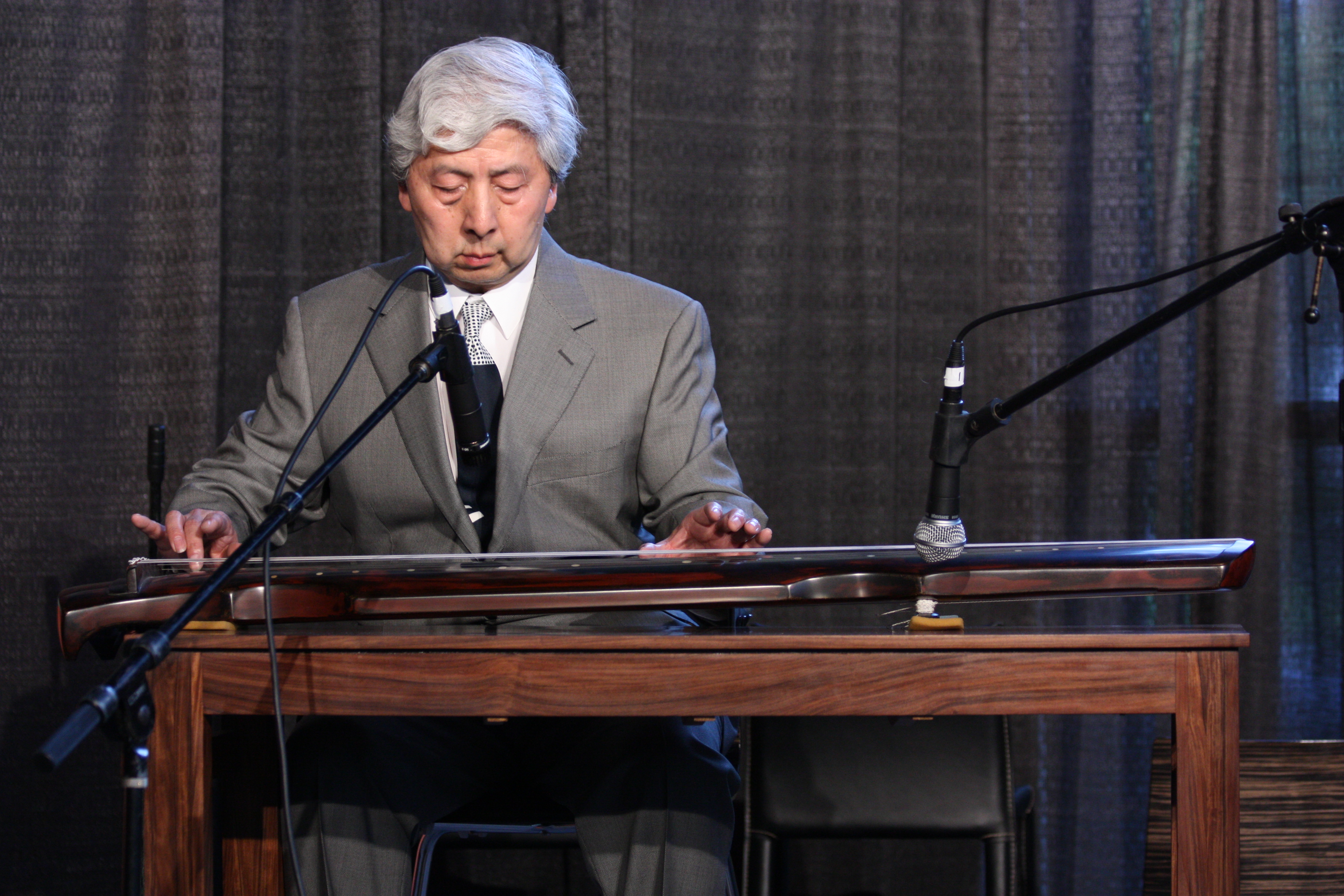
Contemporary guqin player Wu Ziying

This is a list of contemporary players of the guqin of the 20th and 21st centuries. It attempts to list most notable players (i.e. if they are publicly known and/or have made a significant contribution to qin music).

== Table guide ==
- Personal Names (English): Gives name(s) of person in English. If that person was born with a Chinese name, it is listed in Mandarin pinyin. If one has a Cantonese or other Chinese dialect name, the Mandarin pinyin takes priority over it in order listing. The names will be listed in alphabetical order. For the sake of tidiness, the Family name will go first.
- Personal Names (Chinese): Given name(s) of the person in traditional full Chinese characters. If that person does not have a Chinese name, it would be marked 'None'.
- Dates: Gives the year of birth and death of said person. If not known, then deceased (dec.) or active (act.) will be used instead.
- School or Base: The person's school or where they are currently active if known.
- Remarks: Any important information about this person, e.g. their occupation, experience, etc.

== China, Taiwan and Hong Kong SAR ==
Personal Names (English)	Personal Names (Chinese)	Dates	School or Base	Remarks
Tsar Teh-Yun (Mandarin: Cai Deyun)	蔡德允	1905—2007	Hong Kong	Head of the Deyin Qinshe of Hong Kong, oldest qin player in the last generation. Disciple of Shen Caonong. SBS (銀紫荊星章)
Chen Changlin	陳長林	1932-	Min/Lingnan Schools	Transmitter of the Min School. As computer scientist and well-respected guqin player, he participated in the early phase of a "Digital Guqin" project and presented a version using C++, demonstrated a software for generating guqin notations on PC286 which runs on DOS, created in the early 1980s. 國家級非物質文化遺產項目(古琴藝術)代表性傳承人.
Chen Leiji	陳雷激	1967-	Shanghai	Student of Gong Yi. Performed at the 2008 Summer Olympics.
Chen Wen	陳雯	1961-	Taiwan	
Cheng Gongliang	成公亮	1940—2015	Guangling School	Professor of Guqin at Nanjing Conservatory of Music. Notable researcher and composer of guqin music.
Dai Xiaolian	戴曉蓮	1963-	Guangling School	Professor of Guqin at Shanghai Conservatory of Music. Grand-niece of Zhang Ziqian.
Ding Chengyun	丁承運	1944-	Shu	
Ding Jiyuan	丁紀園	1942-	Shu School	
Gong Yi	龔一	1941-	Shanghai (Conservatory)	Elite professional qin player previously from the Shanghai Chinese Orchestra. 國家級非物質文化遺產項目(古琴藝術)代表性傳承人.
Guan Pinghu	管平湖	1897—1967	Jiuyi	Revered master; dapued many qin scores such as Liu Shui and Guangling San. In 1977, his recording of Liu Shui (Flowing Water) was chosen to be included in the Voyager Golden Record, a collection of world music sent into space on the Voyager 1 and Voyager 2 spacecraft.
Guan Zhonghang	關仲航	1900—1970	Jiuyi School	
Gu Meigeng	顧梅羹	1899—1990	Shu School; Huayang	
Gu Zechang	顧澤長	1941—2018	Shu School	
Huang Mianzhi	黃勉之	1853—1919	Jiuyi School	
Li Fan	李璠	1913—2008	Shu School	國家級非物質文化遺產項目(古琴藝術)代表性傳承人.
Li Feng	李楓	1961-	Taiwan	Plays on silk strings; has released a CD.
Li Fengyun	李鳳雲	(act.)	Tianjin	Student of Zhang Ziqian. professor in Tianjin Conservatory of Music. She has published a solo CD album by Hugo.
Li Kongyuan	李孔元	(act.)		
Li Mingzhong	李明忠	(act.)	Xi'an, Shaanxi	Qin scholar and maker.
Li Xiangting	李祥霆	1940-	Beijing (Conservatory)	Elite professional qin player. Current president of the China Guqin Committee. Noted for improvisation. 國家級非物質文化遺產項目(古琴藝術)代表性傳承人.
Li Yuxian	李禹賢	1937—2011	Mei'an School	
Lin Youren	林友仁	1938—2013	Guangling School	Professor of Guqin at Shanghai Conservatory of Music. Transmitter of the Guangling school. 國家級非物質文化遺產項目(古琴藝術)代表性傳承人.
Liu Chicheng	劉赤城	1938—2019	Mei'an School	國家級非物質文化遺產項目(古琴藝術)代表性傳承人.
Lau Chor-wah (Mandarin: Liu Chuhua)	劉楚華	1951-	Hong Kong	One of the top players in Hong Kong.
Liu Jingshao	劉景韶	1903—1987	Mei'an School	
Liu Shaochun	劉少椿	1901—1971	Guangling School	A player of the Guangling School, noted for his eccentric style and interparation.
Liu Zhengchun	劉正春	1935—2013	Jinling	
Lo Ka Ping (Mandarin: Lu Jiabing)	盧家炳	1896—1980	Hong Kong	Has released a CD of his recordings.
Long Qinfang	龍琴舫	1886—1959	Shu School	
Mei Yueqiang	梅曰強	1929—2003	Guangling School	
Pang Yuzhu	龐雨珠	1935-	Mei'an School	
Pei Tiexia	裴鐵俠	1884—1950	Shu School	
Peng Zhiqing	彭祉卿	1891—1946	Shu School	
Pu Xuezhai	溥雪齋	1893—1966	Beijing	The cousin of the last emperor of China, Puyi. An artist of Chinese painting.
Rao Zongyi (Jao Tsung-I)	饒宗頤	1917—2018	Lingnan School	Famous Sinologist, Professor Emeritus and lecturer at CUHK.
Rong Tianqi	容天圻	1936—1994	Guangdong	
Shen Caonong	沈草農	1891—1973	Fanchuan School, Shanghai	
Sun Shaotao	孫紹陶	1879—1949	Guangling School	
Sun Yuqin	孫毓芹	1915—1990	Taiwan	
Tong Kin-woon (Mandarin: Tang Jianyuan)	唐健垣	1946-	Hong Kong	Guqin player and teacher, chief editor of Qinfu 琴府, a composite volume of ancient scores (not to be confused with the Qin Fu of Ji Kang). As well, a virtuoso of the guzheng and nanyin (a singing style).
Wang Di	王迪	1926-2005	Jiuyi School	Female student of Guan Pinghu, did a cross country survey of qin players in 1956, tape recorded qin players using magnetic tapes. These recordings are now in Shanghai. Cecilia Lindqvist was a student of hers.
Wang Duo	汪鐸	1938—2025	Suzhou	Guqin player of the Wumen Qinshe of Suzhou. Head of Guqin Research Centre of Suzhou University of Science and Technology. Special research topics include: silk strings, Dapu, Taoist Guqin music, Guqin master player and musician in the "Digital Guqin" project entitled "Zebrafish".
Wang Huade	王華德	1922—2008	Shu School	
Wang Lu	王露	1879—1921	Zhucheng School	Founder of the 德音琴社 in Jinan.
Wang Peng	王鹏	1966-	Founder, Juntianfang. Beijing	Guqin maestro and master artisan. Wang Peng made the guqin (an exact replica of a 1,000-year-old guqin from the Tang Dynasty) that was used in the Opening Ceremony of the 2008 Summer Olympics. His expertise has been formally recognised by the Chinese Government as an 'asset of China's intangible cultural heritage'. Wang Peng has now repaired and restored more than 180 historic guqin made during China's imperial period. His Jun Tian Fang (钧天坊) complex on the outskirts of Beijing has also been recognised as an "asset of China's intangible cultural heritage." It houses a studio for guqin research, development and manufacture (using traditional techniques); a guqin museum; a guqin teaching academy; a state-of-the-art performance theatre and recording studio; a guqin literature, research and publications collection; and a design studio. Wang Peng is also a virtuoso performer, and has performed across Europe, Australia, and New Zealand, as well as in Canada and the United States. He has authored seven books, contributed to four others, written numerous journal articles, and spoken at several leading universities both within China, and in the Europe and the U.S.
Wang Shengxiang	王生香	1902—1975	Jinling, Shandong	
Wang Yanying	王燕卿	1867—1921	Zhucheng and Mei'an	Founder of the Mei'an School.
Wang Yongchang	王永昌	1940-	Mei'an School	
Wang Youdi	王悠荻	(act.)	Hong Kong	Guqin performer, Guqin teacher at The Hong Kong Academy for Performing Arts (HKAPA), and Guqin tutor at the Chinese University of Hong Kong (CUHK). Enlightened by Prof. Gong Yi; Bachelor of Arts degree from the Central Conservatory of Music in 2010, Supervisor: Prof. Zhao Jiazhen; Master of Music degree from HKAPA in 2012, instructed by Dr. TSE Chun-Yan. Winner of the Gold Medal of the Second National Guqin Competition in 2009. Guqin music design and performance in Three Kingdoms (TV series).
Wei Zhongle	衛仲樂	1908/9—1998	Shanghai	A virtuoso of many Chinese instruments, including the pipa and dizi, and important figure in Jiangnan Sizhu.
Weng Yucang	翁瘦蒼	1916—2002	Yushan School	
Wu Jinglüe	吳景略	1907—1987	Yushan School	Elite master noted for his prominent role in the modernization and professionalization of the instrument.
Wu Jinyang	吳浸陽	1882—?	Sichuan	
Wu Lansun	吳蘭蓀	1883—1960	Yushan School	
Wu Wenguang	吳文光	1946-	Yushan School	Elite professional qin player; son of Wu Jinglue and transmitter of the Yushan school. 國家級非物質文化遺產項目(古琴藝術)代表性傳承人.
Wu Zhao	吳釗	1935—	Beijing	Former president of the Beijing Guqin Society; has published books and research on the qin. 國家級非物質文化遺產項目(古琴藝術)代表性傳承人.
Wu Zhaoji	吳兆基	1908—1997	Hunan	Transmitter of the Wu style.
Wu Zonghan	吳宗漢	1902—1991	Mei'an School	
Xia Yifeng	夏一峰	1872—1963	Jinling	
Xie Daoxiu	謝導秀	1940—2019	Lingnan School	
Tse Chun-Yan (Mandarin: Xie Junren)	謝俊仁	(act.)	Hong Kong	One of the top players in Hong Kong.
Xie Xiaoping	謝孝苹	?—1998	Yushan School	
Xu Jian	許健	1923-2017	Beijing	Qin scholar who wrote the Qinshi Chubian.
Xu Kuanghua	徐匡華	1917—2007	Zhejiang	Founder of the Xihu Qin Society. Appeared in the film, Hero. Died Feb 13, 2007.
Xu Lisun	徐立孫	1897—1969	Mei'an School	
Xu Shaoying	徐曉英	1937—2016	Zhejiang school	
Xu Yuanbai	徐元白	1893—1957	Zhejiang school	
Xu Zhongwei	徐忠偉	1920—	Yushan School	
Yang Xinlun	楊新倫	1898—1990	Lingnan School	
Yang Zongji	楊宗稷	1865—1931	Jiuyi School	Founder of the Jiuyi School, compiler of the Qinxue Congshu.
Yao Bingyan	姚丙炎	1921—1983	Zhejiang school	Dapued (transcribed) the classic version of Jiu Kuang in triple-time rhythm.
Yao Gongbai	姚公白	1948—	Zhejiang	Yao Bingyan's second son. 國家級非物質文化遺產項目(古琴藝術)代表性傳承人.
Yao Gongjing	姚公敬	1955—		Yao Bingyan's third son.
Ye Mingpei	葉名佩	1929—	Zhe School	
Yu Bosun	俞伯蓀	1922—2013	Shu School	
Yu Qingxin	余青欣	1956－2015	Beijing	古琴协会秘书长， 国家一级演员， 國家級非物質文化遺產項目(古琴藝術)代表性傳承人.
Yu Shaoze	喻紹澤	1903—1987	Shu School	Transmitter of the Shu School.
Yue Ying	樂瑛	1904—1974	Jiuyi School	
Zeng Chengwei	曾成偉	1958—	Shu School; Chengdu	Highly regarded guqin maker as well as transmitter of the Shu School.
Zha Fuxi	查阜西	1895—1976	Yushan School	Great researcher and player of qin music, specialising in qin songs.
Zhan Chengqiu	詹澂秋	1890—1973	Zhucheng School	
Teo Kheng-chong (Mandarin: Zhang Qingchong)	張慶崇	(act.)	Hong Kong	Guqin player and researcher from Singapore, musician in sound properties of the guqin instrument, has developed a bright style of guqin playing. Participated in the "Digital Guqin" project entitled: "Pale Ink". Teacher of guqin, and scholar researcher of guqin music.
Zhang Lu	张璐	1992	Beijing	Started learning at 11 years of age. Graduate of the Central Conservatory of Music. Has performed on Chinese television as well as internationally (Australia, New Zealand, England, Russia, Peru, USA).
Zhang Qingji	張清治	1940—	Taiwan	
Zhang Youhe	張友鶴	1895—1940	Zhucheng School	
Zhang Zhisun	章志蓀	1885—?	Taiwan	
Zhang Ziqian	張子謙	1899—1991	Guangling School	Revered master of the Guangling School.
Zhao Jiazhen	赵家珍	(act.)	Beijing	Student of Wu Wenguang and professor at the China Conservatory of Music; Wu Na was a student of Zhao. Zhao has explored film music with guqin and has set up the Zhao Jiazhen Guqin Art Centre (赵家珍古琴艺术中心) in Beijing.
Zhao Xiaoxia	赵晓霞		Beijing	Virtuoso who plays internationally (ex: Tan Dun's piece at UNESCO in Paris (Concert Music for Water, March 22, 2013), and teacher at Beijing Central Conservatory of Music.
Zheng Minzhong	鄭珉中	1923—2019	Jiuyi School; Beijing	Student of Guan Pinghu, well-respected player, specialist in guqin connoisseurship in Palace Museum, Beijing. 國家級非物質文化遺產項目(古琴藝術)代表性傳承人.
Zheng Yunfei	鄭雲飛	1939—2021	Zhejiang school	Originally from Hangzhou, Zhejiang; studied with Xu Yuanbai beginning in 1955; National-Level Representative Inheritor of the Intangible Cultural Heritage item of Guqin Arts (Zhejiang school)

== United States ==
Personal Names (English)	Personal Names (Chinese)	Dates	School or Base	Remarks
Binkley, Jim	畢克禮	(act.)	Portland, Oregon	Translated the Yugu Zhai Qinpu into English, amateur qin maker. Website
Dydo, Stephen	戴德	(act.)	Yonkers, NY	Co-founder and current president of New York Qin Society; also makes guqin. Website
He, Yu	何宇	(act.)	Columbus, OH	Student of Shuishan Yu.
Liang, Mingyue	梁銘越	(act.)	Ellicott City, MD	Son of the renowned Taiwanese guzheng player/scholar Liang Tsai-Ping.
Li, Yiming	李一鳴	(act.)	San Francisco, CA	A Qin player (taught by Gu, Zechang.Gong Yi. Li, Xiangting. Zhao, jiazhen) and Guqin Society International President in San Francisco. Graduate of Shenyang Conservatory of Music, Liaoning Province, PRC.
Lieberman, Fredric	None	(dec.)	Santa Cruz, CA	Translated the Mei'an Qinpu into English.
Liu Li	劉麗	(act.)	New York, NY	A graduate in Guqin performance at the Central Conservatory of Music, taught by renowned players such as Wu Jinglüe, Wu Wenguang as well as Li Xiangting. An Associate Professor in Guqin at the China Conservatory of Music in Beijing before moving to the US. Collaborated with composer Tan Dun and violin virtuoso Itzhak Perlman on recording the soundtrack for the movie Hero
Lui Pui-Yuen	吕培原	(act.)	Los Angeles, CA	Student of Wu Zonghan, Meian School. Well-known pipa master. Director of the Spring Thunder Chinese Music Orchestra, 春雷国乐社。
Lui Tsun-Yuen			Los Angeles, CA	Brother of Lui Pui-Yuen. Headed Chinese Music Program at UCLA's Department of Ethnomusicology.
Jiaoyue Lyu	吕皎月	(act.)	New York University New York, NY	A Guqin and Zhu (筑) performer based in New York City, held the solo recital at Carnegie Hall on June 2, 2014 and October 29, 2016 in Lincoln Center of Performing Arts.
Yung, Bell (Mandarin: Rong Hongzeng)	榮鴻曾	(act.)	Pittsburgh	
Thompson, John	唐世璋	(act.)	New York, NY	American whose "historically informed performance" includes over 150 melodies he has reconstructed from early tablature including the entire Shen Qi Mi Pu. His website includes translation, analysis and over 70 sound files with his reconstructions.
Wang Fei	王菲	(act.)	San Francisco Bay Area, CA	A qin player taught by Li Xiangting.
Wong Gleysteen, Marilyn (Mandarin: Wang Miaolian)	王妙蓮	(act.)	Washington, D.C.	
Wu Ziying	吳自英	1943—	Seattle, WA	A guqin and pipa player (taught by Wang Jiru 王吉儒, Wu Jinglüe吳景略, Zha Fuxi 查阜西, Sun Zongpeng 孫宗彭, Xu Lisun 徐立蓀, and Gu Meigeng 顧梅羹); former professor of traditional Chinese Music at Shanghai Normal University and director of the Shanghai Qin Association; produced two CDs of guqin classics with the support of the 2006 Jack Straw Artist Support Program. Website
Yang Shin-yi	楊信宜	(act.)	Boston, MA	Student of Wang Haiyan (Mei'an school) and Tang Jianyuan.
Yip Mingmei (Mandarin: Ye Mingmei)	葉明媚	(act.)	New York, NY	Qin scholar, a student of Cai Deyun.
Yeh Shihhua	葉時華	(act.)	New York, NY	Graduated from Taipei University of the Art, major in the qin. MA of Ethnomusicology of Sheffield University, UK. A professional qin and zheng player and educator.
Yu Shuishan	于水山	(act.)	Boston, MA	Student of Wu Ziying; founder of the North America Mei'an Guqin Society, professor of architecture at Northeastern University.
Yuan Jungping	袁中平	(act.)	New York, NY	Student of Sun Yuqin and Wu Zhaoji; founder of the New York Qin Society.
Zhang Peiyou	張培幼	(act.)	New York, NY	A qin player and teacher, former student of Yuan Jungping. Website
Wang, Geng	王耕	(act.)	Iowa City, IA	Student of Li Fengyun. Website
Wang, Bohan	王博瀚	(act.)	San Francisco Bay Area, CA	Student of Wu Ziying.
Dai, Zelin	戴泽霖	(act.)	SF Bay Area, CA	A qin player of the Guangling School.

== Canada ==
Personal Names (English)	Personal Names (Chinese)	Dates	School or Base	Remarks
Wong, Fred (Mandarin: Huang Shuzhi)	黃樹志	(act.)	Coquitlam, BC	Producer of the Taigu silk strings. Editor of modern qin book series, Qinxue Congkan.
Kiu Shan (Mandarin: Qiao Shan)	喬姍	(act.)	Vancouver, BC	Founder of Jiuyi Qin Association
Yeung, Juni L. (Mandarin: Yang Junli)	楊儁立	1987—	Toronto, ON	Founder and President of the University of Toronto Guqin Association (now the Toronto Guqin Society). Pen name: Satsuki Shizuka 五月 靜
Jiance Atom Wang	汪建策	-	Toronto, ON	Owner of Hermitspavilion.ca, Director of UTChinese Qin Society
Clover Yi Hu	胡昳	-	Toronto, ON	Owner of Hermitspavilion.ca

== Germany ==
Personal Names (English)	Personal Names (Chinese)	Dates	School or Base	Remarks
Dahmer, Manfred	曼大墨	(act.)	Germany	Qin and guitar player, book author ("Qin - die klassische chinesische Griffbrettzither"), scholar in Chinese culture.
Li, Pengpeng	李蓬蓬	(act.)	Weimar, Germany	Daughter of the famous chinese guqin player Li Xiangting.
Stoevesandt, Ingo	None	(act.)	Ritterhude, Germany	Maintainer of "The music of Southeast Asia".
Ziegler, Henning	奇和寜	(act.)	Berlin, Germany	Website

== Brazil ==
Personal Names (English)	Personal Names (Chinese)	Dates	School or Base	Remarks
Ribeiro, André		1975-	São Paulo, Brazil	Composer and ethnomusicologist. Qin player under the guidance of Peiyou Chang, and has as mentor Yuan Jung-Ping. Researches oriental poetics in concert music, organizing the research group POEM, linked to the postdoctoral program of the USP Department of Music. Co-founder of Guqin Brazil Association (2019), and artistic director of the Gaoshan Liushui Ensemble of Chinese Music, since 2012. He also conducts ethnographic research on music in Buddhist rites and ceremonies.
"vermelho" Garcia, Victor		1992-	São Paulo, Brazil	Musician (doctor graduated in medicine from the University of São Paulo) Qin player, under the guidance of 白无瑕 Bai Wuxia from the Shangai Conservatory. Co-founder of Guqin Brazil Association.

== Others ==
Personal Names (English)	Personal Names (Chinese)	Dates	School or Base	Remarks
Cheng Yu	程玉	(act.)	London, UK	Qin and pipa player from Beijing now resident in London. Founder and President of the London Youlan Qin Society and several Chinese music ensembles in Britain.
Tsua, Charles Rupert	徐永裕(長韻)	1983—	Shu School; Birmingham, UK	Former compiler of the guqin and most relating articles on Wikipedia. Member of the Committee of the London Youlan Qin Society. Studied under Zeng Chengwei and plays primarily under the Shu School style. Independent scholar.
Chow, Shuen-git / Swannjie (Mandarin: Zhou Xuanjie)	周旋捷	(act.)	Canada/France/China-HK	Chinese Canadian, created video documentary of Master guqin players, and children players - largest collection outside of China. Initiated the "Digital Guqin" projects to introduce guqin sounds to a wider, youthful audience as a lead in for authentic guqin culture and practice. Designed new guqin forms, research-creations using CAO (computer assisted composition) to explore possibilities of guqin sound wave treatments in contemporary art and culture. Created new designs in traditional guqin instruments, i.e. the "Half HunDun 2006", building of Digital Guqin Museum in 3D immersive virtual world platform Second life. > World's First Carbon Fiber Guqin prototype : original design "Half HunDun", July 2016. weight 2.38 kg. Carbon Fiber and lacquer, hard wood > Second prototype in the making : original design "Who's in the Qin?",, Website
Fushimi Kiyoshi	伏見靖	1956-	Kyoto, Japan	Guqin player, scholar in Japanese and Chinese traditional music. Style lineage from Mme. Tsar Teh-Yun. Director of Kamakura Qin Society then the 疇祉琴社 Chûshi Qin Society.
Michele Cesaratto		(act.)	Udine, Italy	Guqin player, performer of Jiang Kui ci, founder of Chinese traditional music ensemble "Pelagia Noctiluca". Currently based in Florence.
Gulik, Robert Hans van	高羅佩	1910—1967	Netherlands	Dutch writer who wrote the important Lore of the Chinese Lute, also famous detective novelist, Ming style woodblock print specialist, diplomat. Erudite scholar in Chinese culture.
Kim, Sang-sun	金商順 (김상순)	(act.)	Seoul, Korea	Gayageum player who went to China to study guqin under Li Xiangting. Has an album published in Korea called 琴聲還鳴 (금성환명).
Sakata Shinichi	坂田進一	(act.)	Japan	Guqin player, composer, scholar in the Japanese and Chinese traditional music, writer, director of Tokyo Kin-sha (Tokyo Qin Society).
Vigo, Joan M	易兆安	(act.)	Spain	Founder and webmaster of the Friends of Guqin website.
Streller-Shen, Qin	沈沁	(act.)	Switzerland	Guqin player and guqin teacher, Master of Philosophy from China Conservatory of Music. Teacher and webmaster of the www.qinqin.ch website.
Takei Yuki (Gao Yusheng)	武井欲生 (高欲生)	1963-	Tokyo, Japan	Representative Director of Japan Society for Promotions of Guqin (Inc. Association)

== See also ==
- Guqin societies
- Traditional Chinese musical instruments
