= Chuigushou =

Han musical ensemble

Chuigushou is a type of traditional percussive musical ensemble most often used at weddings and funerals by the Han Chinese, which usually accompanies a double reed instrument called a suona. This type of folk music is diverse, sometimes happy, sometimes sad, and often based on Western Pop music and TV theme songs.

== Background ==
The Han Chinese, who make up some 92% of the population of China, play heterophonic music in which the musicians play versions of a single melody line. Percussion accompanies most music, dance and opera. Han folk music thrives at weddings and funerals and usually included a double reed instrument called a suona and percussive ensembles called chuigushou. The music is diverse, sometimes jolly, sometimes sad, and often based on Western Pop music and TV theme songs.

Instrumental pieces played on an erhu or dizi are popular, and are often available outside of China, but qin, pipa and zheng music, which is more traditional, are more popular in China itself. The qin is perhaps the national instrument of China, and its virtuosos are stars. These include Zha Fuxi, Wu Wen'guang, Lin Youren, Wu Jinglue, Wu Zhaoji, Guan Pinghu, Zhang Zijian, Li Xiangting, and Gong Yi. The zheng, a form of zither, is most popular in Henan, Chaozhou, Hakka, and Shandong. The pipa, a kind of lute, believing introduced from Arab areas during 6th century and improved, is most popular in Shanghai and surrounding areas.

== See also ==
- Suona
- Chinese traditional music
