= List of guqin societies =

This is a list of currently existing qin societies, of which some are learned societies.

There is a difference between qin schools and qin societies. The former concerns itself with transmission of a style, the latter concerns itself with performance. The qin society will encourage meetings with fellow qin players in order to play music and maybe discuss the nature of the qin. Gatherings such as this are called yaji (雅集, literally "elegant gatherings"), and take place once every month or two. Sometimes, societies may go on excursions to places of natural beauty to play qin, or attend conferences. They may also participate in competitions or research. Of course, societies do not have to have a strict structure to adhere to; it could mostly be on a leisurely basis. The main purpose of qin societies is to promote and play qin music. It is often a good opportunity to network and learn to play the instrument, to ask questions and to receive answers.

Most qin schools and societies are based in China, but during the twentieth century many overseas societies began to form. Although qin study was initially confined to China in ancient times, countries like Japan also have their own qin traditions via import from China, but are extremely small in scale. The Tokyo Qin Society was recently founded, opening up more opportunities for qin study in Japan. Japan has published a qinpu (qin tablature collection) in the past, known as Toukou Kinpu or Donggao Qinpu 【東臯琴譜】. Other qin societies exist in North America and Europe, which are less formal than their counterparts in mainland China, such as the North American Guqin Association and the London Youlan Qin Society.

== China, etc ==
| Society Name (English) | Society Name (Chinese) | Location or base | Date of founding | Website | Remarks |
|---|---|---|---|---|---|
Northern China
| Beijing Guqin Yanjiu Hui | 北京古琴研究會 | Beijing | November 1947 | | |
| Peking University Guqin Society | 北京大學古琴社 | Beijing | September 2001 | | |
| Shandong Deyin Qinshe | 山東德音琴社 | Jinan | 6 November 2003 | | |
| Shandong Guqin Yianjiu Hui | 山東古琴研究會 | Shandong | | | |
| Yuanyin Qinshe | 元音琴社 | Taiyuan | 1921 | | |
| Songfeng Qinshe | 松風琴社 | Dalian | July 2000 | | |
| Shenyang Guqin Yianjiuhui | 沈陽古琴研究會 | Shenyang | March 1980 | | |
| Jinjiang Qinshe | 錦江琴社 | Chengdu | 1979 | | The main qin society out of many in the Chengdu/Chongqing area. |
| Bohai Qinshe | 渤海琴社 | Shijiazhuang | | | |
| Tongshan-Xian Guqin Xuehui | 銅山縣古琴學會 | Cuizhou | 1987 | | |
Southern China
| Jinyu Qin Society | 今虞琴社 | Shanghai | 1934 | | The principal qin society in the Shanghai area. Has many activities and preeminent members of the years. |
| Mei'an Qinshe | 梅庵琴社 | Nantong | 1929 | Website | |
| Xiaoyiao Qinshe | 逍遥琴社 | Hefei | 1999 | | |
| Xihu Qinshe | 西湖琴社 | Hangzhou | 1987 | | |
| Wumen Qinshe | 蘇州吳門琴社 | Suzhou | November 1986 | | |
| Guangling Qinshe | 廣陵琴社 | Yangzhou | 1915 | | |
| Mengqi Qinshe | 夢溪琴社 | Zhenjiang | | | |
| Yushan Qinshe | 虞山琴社 | Changshu | Revived 1984 | | |
| Jinling Qinshe | 金陵琴社 | Nanjing | 1934 | | |
| Bozhou Guqin Yianjiuhui | 播洲古琴研究會 | Guizhou | 1986 | | |
| Guangdong Guqin Yianjiuhui | 廣東古琴研究會 | Canton | October 1980 | | |
| Foshan Guqin Society | 佛山古琴研究會 | Canton | December 2006 | Website | |
Hong Kong
| Deyin Qinshe | 德愔琴社 | Hong Kong | 1998 | | Founded by students of Tsar Teh-Yun. |
| Tianting Qinshe | 天聽琴社 | Hong Kong | July 1959 | | |
| Tang Yishe | 唐藝社 | Hong Kong | | | |
Taiwan
| Haitian Qinshe | 海天琴社 | Taiwan | | | |
| Hezhen Qinshe | 和真琴社 | Taiwan | | | |
| Yingzhou Qinshe | 瀛洲琴社 | Taiwan | 1999? | Website | |
| Tianmu Ge Sixian Qinshe | 天穆閣絲弦琴社 | Taiwan | | | |
| Chinese Guqin Study Group – Taipei Qin Hall | 中華古琴學會-臺北琴道舘 | Taiwan | 2010s | Website | |
| Taiwan Qin Society | 台灣琴會 | Taiwan | 2014? | Website | |
| Taiwan Guqin Association | 台灣古琴協會 | Taiwan | 2010s | Website | |
| Xiangeng Qinshe | 弦耕琴社 | Taiwan | 2015? | | |
Other Chinese locations and to-be-classified
| Youtong Qinshe | 友桶琴社 | | | | |
| Wuxing Qinshe | 吳興琴社 | | | | |

== Asia ==
| Society Name (English) | Society Name (Chinese) | Location or base | Date of founding | Website | Remarks |
|---|---|---|---|---|---|
Japan
| Tokyo Qin Society | 東京琴社 | Tokyo | | | Mainly formed by overseas Chinese students studying in Tokyo. |
| Kamakura Qin Society | 鎌倉琴社 | Kanagawa | 2002 | | Founded by Muka Fushimi. Restructured in 2013 into the Chushi Qin Society after Fushimi moved to Kyoto. |
| Chushi Qin Society | 疇祉琴社 | Kyoto | 2013 | Website | Formerly of Kamakura Qin Society. |
| Japan Society for Promotions of Guqin | 日本古琴振興会 | Tokyo | 2015 | Website | |
Singapore
| "He Yue Zhai" Guqin Music and Arts Centre | "龢樂齋"古琴館 | Singapore | October 2013 | Website | |
Malaysia
| Dalü Guqin Music School | 大吕琴院 | Kepong, Malaysia | 2010 | Website | |
Thailand
| Siam Guqin | 元韻山房 (สำนักหยวนอวิ้นซานฝาง) | Bangkok | 2010 | Website | Founded by Chatchol Thaikheaw who studied under various Chinese players, including Li Xiangting. |

== North America ==
| Society Name (English) | Society Name (Chinese) | Location or base | Date of founding | Website | Remarks |
|---|---|---|---|---|---|
United States of America
| North American Guqin Association | 北美琴社 | San Francisco | 1997 | Website | One of the earliest qin societies in the West headed by Wang Fei. Activities are wide-ranging. |
| North America Mei'an Society | 北美梅庵琴社 | Boston | 2009 | Website | Founded by Yu Shuishan. |
| New York Guqin Association | 紐約古琴研究會 | New York City | 2015 | Website | Founded by Liu Li. |
| New York Guqin School | 紐約梅庵琴苑 | New York City | 2013 | Website | Founded by 葉時華 Shihhua (Judy) Yeh, first New York based qin school to teach qin in the formal way. |
| New York Qin Society | 紐約琴社 | New York City | 2000 | Website | A more formal qin society based in New York. |
Canada
| Jiuyi Qinshe | 九嶷琴社 | Vancouver | 2005 | Website | |
| University of Toronto Guqin Association | 多倫多大學古琴社 | Toronto | 2005 | https://web.archive.org/web/20060501041347/http://guqin.sa.utoronto.ca/ (defunct) | Restructured into the "University of Toronto Chinese Cultural Aesthetic Society (UTCCAS)" since August 2007, guqin aspects again restructured in August 2008. |
| Toronto Guqin Society (TQS) | 多倫多古琴社 | Toronto | 2008 | Website | Restructured from UTCCAS's guqin operations in August 2008, with this group oriented toward the Toronto community. |

== Europe ==
| Society Name (English) | Society Name (Chinese) | Location or base | Date of founding | Website | Remarks |
|---|---|---|---|---|---|
United Kingdom
| London Youlan Qin Society | 倫敦幽蘭琴社 | London, UK | July 2003 | Website | A formal and very active qin society catering for UK qin players. Organises a guqin summer school each year. |
Mainland Europe
| Berlin Boya Qin Association | 柏林博雅古琴社 | Berlin, Germany | Autumn 2016 | | |
| Friends of Guqin : Amics del Guqin | 古琴之友 | Spain; internet-based | September 2004 | Website (defunct) | Though not officially a society, their activities were mostly internet-based and also translated qin books into Spanish. They have been inactive since Aug 2011 and presumably defunct. |

== Oceania ==
| Society Name (English) | Society Name (Chinese) | Location or base | Date of founding | Website | Remarks |
|---|---|---|---|---|---|
Australia
| Australian Guqin Society Incorporated | 澳大利亞中國琴會 | Melbourne | Feb 2018 | | |
| Guqin in Sydney | 悉尼古琴同好會 | Sydney | Mid-2010s | Website | |
| JianZhai Guqin Sydney | 简斋古琴 | Sydney | 2021 | Website | |

== Others ==
| Society Name (English) | Society Name (Chinese) | Location or base | Date of founding | Website | Remarks |
|---|---|---|---|---|---|
| Guqin – 古琴 (a.k.a. International Guqin Society) | 國際琴社 | International; internet-based | 22 October 2006 | Website | The largest online Facebook group mainly catering for English-speaking qin players residing in the West. |

== See also ==
- Guqin
- Contemporary guqin players
- Traditional Chinese musical instruments
- International Directory of Guqin Teachers
