= Zhang Ziqian =

Chinese musician

- 張子謙
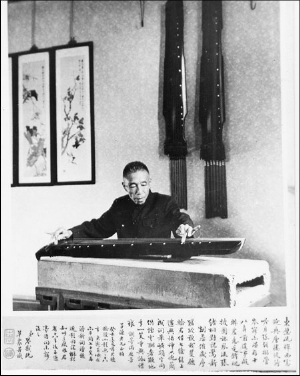
- Zhang Ziqian in middle age
- Born: October 3, 1899; Yangzhou, Jiangsu Province, Qing
- Died: January 5, 1991 (aged 91); Tianjin, PRC
- Occupation: Guqin player
- Musical career
- Genres: Traditional Chinese music
- Instrument: Guqin

Zhang Ziqian
- Chinese: 張子謙
Transcriptions
Standard Mandarin
- Hanyu Pinyin: Zhang Ziqian

Zhang Ziqian (simplified Chinese: 张子谦; traditional Chinese: 張子謙, 1899–1991), a famous seven-string zither qin player, was born in Yangzhou, Jiangsu Province, China, during the late Qing Dynasty. He began studying the guqin with a guqin master Sun Shaotao at the age of thirteen. In the 1930s, Zhang moved to Shanghai and worked as an accountant at a salt factory. In Shanghai, he met Zha Fuxi and Peng Zhiqing who were active qin players then. They frequently played the guqin together and Zhang's playing skills were greatly influenced by them. In 1936, Zhang, Zha, Peng and other masters founded Jin Yu Qin She (Qin Society of Contemporary Yu Region), a qin society. In 1956, Zhang became a guqin performer by being appointed as a member of the state-run Shanghai Minzu Yuetuan (Shanghai National Music Ensemble); and a guqin teacher at the Shanghai Conservatory of Music in 1960.

As a professional guqin performer of the Guangling School, one of the qin schools, Zhang skillfully transcribed guqin pieces from ancient manuscripts with the Guangling style and his distinctive interpretations, e.g. rhythmic variations. His famous pieces includes Longxiang Cao (Soaring Dragon), Pingsha Luoyan (Geese Descending on the Sandbank), and Meihua Sannong (Three Variations of Plum Blossom). His rendition of Longxiang Cao is considered one of his best interpretations and thus he is also known as Zhang Longxiang (張龍翔).

Zhang was also devoted to writing articles and essays on guqin. In 1961, he published Guqin Chujie (A Preliminary Introduction to the Guqin) with Zha Fuxi and Shen Caonong. This publication features guqin history, guqin construction, guqin playing technique, guqin notation, and guqin pieces, which is considered a major introductory manual for beginners.
