= Kadri Gopalnath =

Indian saxophonist (1949–2019)

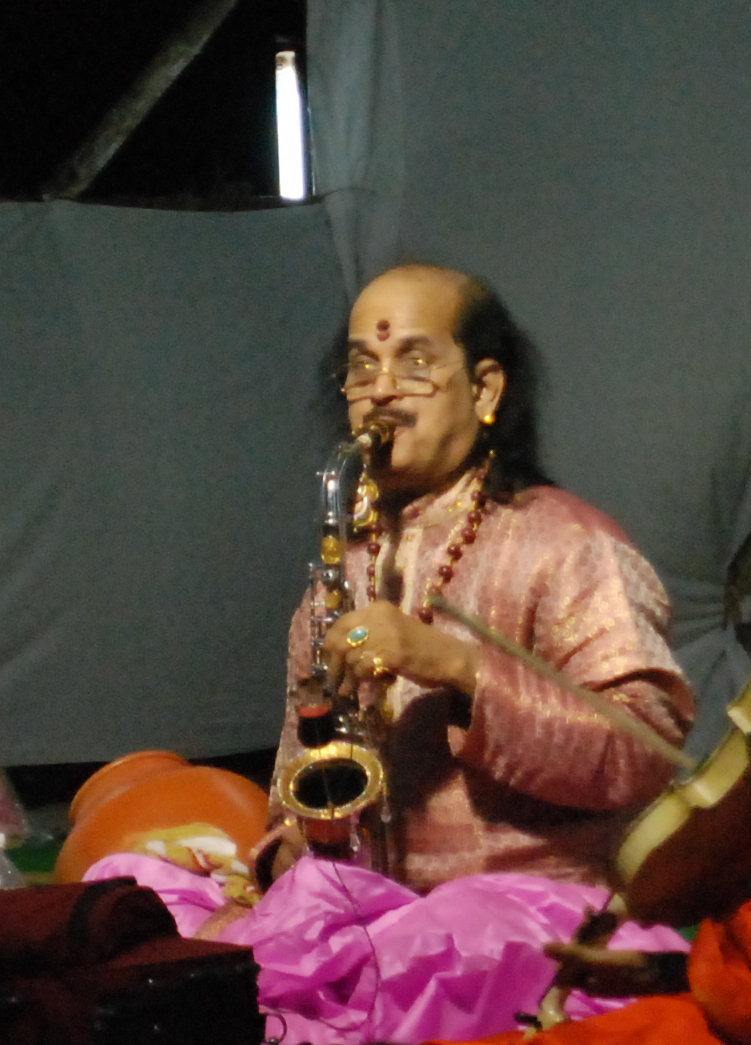
- Kadri Gopalnath performing at Pillayarpatti

Background information
- Born: 6 December 1949; Bantwal taluk, Dakshina Kannada, Karnataka, India
- Died: 11 October 2019 (aged 69) Mangalore, Karnataka, India
- Genres: Indian classical music, film music, jazz fusion
- Occupation: Saxophonist
- Instrument: Saxophone
- Years active: 1957–2019

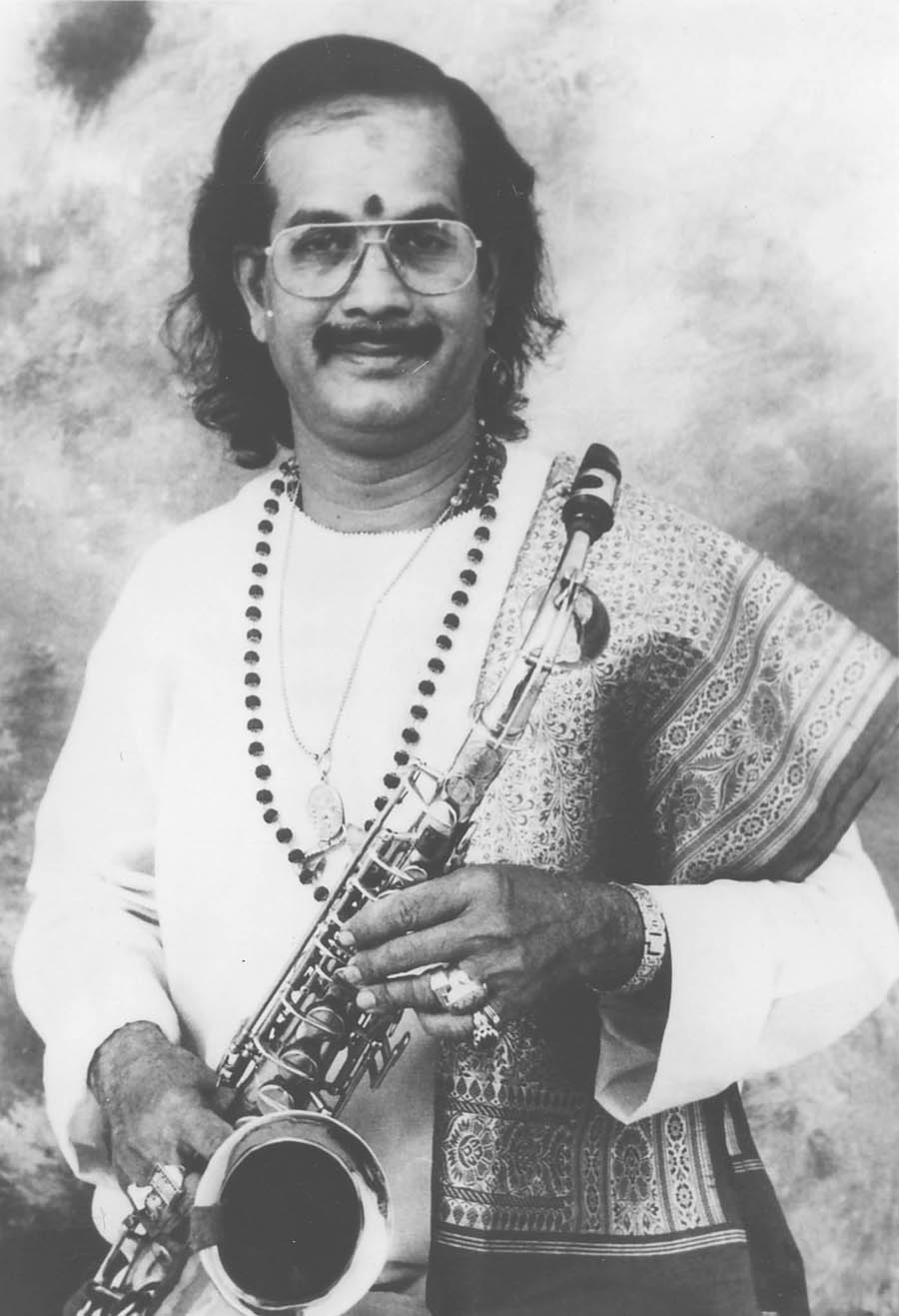
Shri Kadri Gopalnath

Kadri Gopalnath (6 December 1949 – 11 October 2019) was an Indian alto saxophonist and one of the pioneers of Carnatic music for that instrument.

== Early life ==
Born in a Tulu speaking Jogi community of Sajeepa Mooda village in Bantwal taluk of Dakshina Kannada to Taniyappa (a Naadaswara vidwan) and Gangamma, Gopalnath was inspired to learn the saxophone as a child after hearing it played by the Mysore Palace band set, although he took nearly 20 years to master the complexities of the western wind instrument. He was eventually crowned the "Saxophone Chakravarthy".

== Career ==
Gopalnath learnt to play Carnatic music on the saxophone from N. Gopalakrishna Iyer of Kalaniketan, Mangalore. He presented his first concert in the All India Radio, Mangaluru in 1978. In Madras, Gopalnath came in contact with the vocalist and mridangist guru T.V. Gopalkrishnan, who identified the youngster's potential and tutored him.

Gopalnath had to make certain modifications to the conventional alto saxophone to play Carnatic music. So successful was this adaptation that the great musician Semmangudi Srinivasa Iyer, the doyen of Carnatic music, acknowledged Kadri Gopalnath as a true Carnatic music genius.

His maiden live performance was for the Chembai Memorial Trust. The 1980 Bombay Jazz Festival was a turning point for Gopalnath. John Handy, a jazz musician from California was present at the festival. Hearing Gopalnath play, Handy asked if he could go on stage and perform alongside him. So well did the two mesh, Handy in the jazz style and Gopalnath in the Carnatic style, that it became an instant hit with the audience. Gopalnath has participated in the Jazz Festival in Prague, the Berlin Jazz Festival, the International Cervantino Festival in Mexico, the Music Hall Festival in Paris, the BBC Promenade concert in 1994 at London, and has toured all over the world.

He cut many albums and recorded a number of cassettes and CDs. Together with jazz flautist James Newton, he recorded Southern Brothers. His production called 'East-West' is an audio-video presentation that, as the title suggests, is a fusion of Western and Indian music. This album took 6 months to produce and has compositions from Saint Tyagaraja, Beethoven and the like.

In 2005, Gopalnath began a collaboration with American saxophonist and composer Rudresh Mahanthappa, which resulted in the 2008 album Kinsmen (Pi Recordings) and supporting US tour.

Gopalnath was also a famed teacher, having taught many prominent saxophonists around the world.

== Death ==
Gopalnath died on 11 October 2019 due to cardiac arrest at the age of 69 at a private hospital in Mangalore. He was ailing for a long time before his death, and could not attend many concerts. His dead body was taken to ancestral village on 13 October, and was cremated there with full state honours. He is survived by his wife Sarojini and three children, among whom, his younger son Manikanth Kadri, is also a professional musician and music director.

== Awards, titles and tributes ==
Gopalnath was presented with the Sangeet Natak Akademi Award for Carnatic Music – Instrumental (Saxophone), by President A. P. J. Abdul Kalam, in New Delhi on 26 October 2004.

Many titles and honours had come his way, the most cherished being the Asthana Vidwan of Sri Kanchi Kamakoti Peetam, Sri Sringeri Sharadha Peetam, Sri Ahobila Mutt and Sri Pillayarpatti Temple. He was awarded the Padma Shri in 2004.

Gopalnath had the distinction of being the first Carnatic musician to be invited in the BBC Promenade concert in 1994, in the Royal Albert Hall at London. The Asian Music Circuit, U.K., sponsored his recital.

Among his other distinctions are: Saxophone Charkravarthy, Saxophone Samrat, Ganakala Shree, Nadapasana Brahma, Sunada Prakashika, Nada Kalarathna, Nada Kalanidhi, Sangeetha Vadya Rathna, Karnataka Kalashree in 1996, Vocational Excellency Award from the Rotary of Madras, Tamil Nadu State Award "Kalaimamani" and Karnataka Rajyotsava Award in 1998.

He received an honorary doctorate from Bangalore University in 2004.

The 2008 album Blue Rhizome by the New Quartet features a tribute to the saxophonist called "Gopalnath" (composed by Karl E. H. Seigfried).

He received the Sangeetha Kalasikhamani award for the year 2013 given by The Indian Fine arts Society, Chennai.

He received the Kamban Pugazh award for the year 2018 given by All Ceylon Kamban Society, Sri Lanka.
