= Yu Shuishan =

- 于水山
- Born: January 7, 1971; Zhaoyuan, Shandong Province, China
- Occupation(s): Professor, Guqin player
- Musical career
- Genres: Traditional Chinese music
- Instrument: Guqin

Yu Shuishan (Chinese: 于水山; pinyin: Yú Shuǐshān) is one of the master contemporary guqin players and contributors. He is a Professor of Architecture in the College of Arts, Media and Design at the Northeastern University, a fourth generation Mei’an School guqin player, and the founder of North America Mei'an Society (北美梅庵琴社).

== Biography ==
Shuishan Yu graduated from Tsinghua University, and joined Northeastern University since 2012. His research focuses on Chinese architecture, modern architecture and its theoretical discourse, literati arts, and Buddhist architecture in East Asia. His current research projects include case studies of historic streets in China and the role they played in the modernization of Chinese cities, architecture and urbanism of Beijing, and literati gardens of the Ming-Qing dynasties, and a new theory and method of qin music to be published by the prestigious Zhonghua Book Company. He is a key member and contributor to the GAHTC, an organization of architectural historians aiming for the integration of global history of architecture and the development of new pedagogical strategy in teaching architectural history.

His book Chang’an Avenue and the Modernization of Chinese Architecture was published in English by the University of Washington Press (2012) and in Chinese by the Sanlian Shudian Press (2016). He has also published articles, book chapters, and exhibition catalogs and presented conference papers on the city and architecture of Beijing, Tibetan Buddhist architecture, Chinese literati art, and modern architectural historiography. Yu's research projects are mostly case studies aiming for the demystification of a specific historical site, issue, or phenomenon, and highlight the significance, nature, and problem of cross-cultural translation of architectural forms, practices, and theories.

Before joining Northeastern University, Yu has worked as an architect in the Ministry of Construction Architectural Design Institute in Beijing and taught in the Department of Art and Art History at the Oakland University in Michigan. He has been teaching Architecture and Global Cultures, Pre-Modern Chinese Architecture, and the Modernization of Chinese Architecture at Northeastern. He has taught Western Architectural History in Beijing, Chinese Architecture in the School of Architecture at the University of Washington, and Chinese Architecture, Buddhist Art, Chinese Art, Japanese Art, Asian Art Survey, and Applied Guqin Performance at Oakland.

Yu is also a distinguished qin musician and the current chair of the North America Mei’an Guqin Society. Learning Chinese instruments since age seven, he later studied guqin with Wu Ziying (吳自英), a third generation Mei’an School player who had learned from such renowned 20th-century masters as Wang Jiru (王吉儒), Xu Lisun (徐立孫), Wu Jinglue (吳景略), and Zha Fuxi (査阜西). Prof. Yu founded the North America Mei’an Guqin Society in 2009 and served as its chair since then. He is especially committed to the spread of guqin music among non-Chinese speaking communities. He taught applied guqin at the Oakland University in 2009–12. His fingering-centered etude writing aims to systematize experience-based guqin education and his composition explores new possibilities rooted in the Chinese musical traditions. Prof. Yu has been invited for performance and lecture on qin music both in the US and internationally.

Prof. Yu has also published three albums on improvisation and extemporisation on the qin, which are The Pure Sound of Mountain and Water 【山水清音】(2009), The Vibrant Rhythm of Ancient Heroes 【長虹古韻】(2012) and The Utopia Empathy of Past and Present 【一契落英】(2017) respectively.

== Publications ==
=== Books ===
- Chang’an Avenue and the Modernization of Chinese Architecture, University of Washington Press (2012)

=== Albums ===
- The Pure Sound of Mountain and Water (2009)
- The Vibrant Rhythm of Ancient Heroes (2012)
- The Utopia Empathy of Past and Present (2017)

== See also ==
- Contemporary guqin players

Please see: References section in the guqin article for a full list of references used in all qin related articles.
