= Zhe school =

The term Zhe school may refer to:

- Zhe school (painting), a 15th-century Chinese school of landscape painters
- Zhe school (guqin), a school of musicians for the guqin
