= Jinling Guqin School =

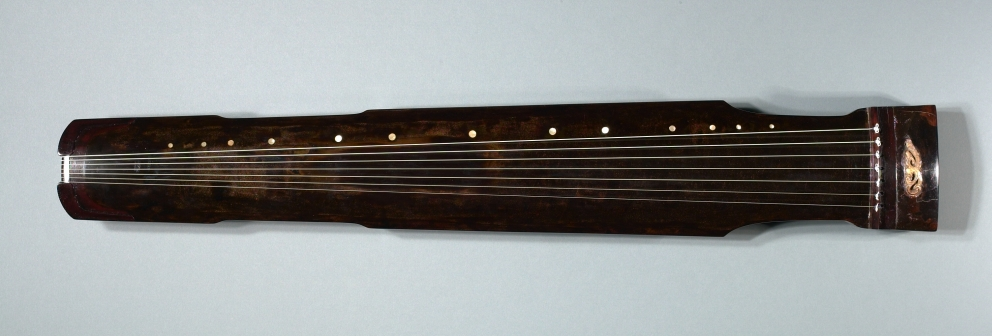
Guqin: an ancient Chinese stringed musical instrument

The Jinling Guqin School is a genre of Guqin playing in Chinese history. The Jinling Guqin school first rose to influence in Nanjing, China towards the end of the Ming dynasty of Nanjing, China and matured into its own during the Qing dynasty.

== History ==
=== Late Ming and early Qing Dynasty ===
The Jinling Guqin School (Mandarin: 金陵古琴學校) originated during the Late Ming to the early Qing Dynasty. The School, in a generalized sense, includes the musicians Huang Longshan, Yang Biaozheng, and Yang Lun, as well as Zhuang Zhenfeng, who wrote a book of sheet music called "Qin Sue Xin Sheng Xie Pu". In the narrow sense of the Jinling Guqin School, there is another person whose works can be found in the "Wuzhizhai Qinpu", but the relevant person is unknown.

=== Modern times ===
The Nanjing Musical Association was established with Gan Tao as president and Xia Yifeng as vice president on 23 December 1954. Within the association, the guqin players restored and organized repertoires such as "Wild Geese on the Sandbank" and "Guangling Melody". Later, the group of guqin players became independent from the Nanjing Musical Association and officially established the Jinling Guqin Association. Their activities paused during the Cultural Revolution, and only revived in 1978. Currently, the representations of the Association are Gui Shimin and Liu Zhengchun, and both of them are classified as cultural inheritors of the Jinling Guqin School as a national intangible cultural heritage.

== Inheritance and protection ==
The Jinling Guqin School was included in the second batch of China's national intangible cultural heritage list in June, 2008. On 14 October 2018, the Chinese Examination Museum in Nanjing held an academic conference titled "The Art of Guqin: Jinling Guqin School."

== See also ==
- Qin schools
- Contemporary guqin players
