= London Youlan Qin Society =

The London Youlan Qin Society (simplified Chinese: 伦敦幽兰琴社; traditional Chinese: 倫敦幽蘭琴社; often abbreviated to LYQS) is a London-based qin society serving guqin players in the UK. Of the three major qin societies of the West (the other two being the North American Guqin Association and the New York Qin Society), this society was the most informal but still the most active in terms of regular events and yajis.

The Society began to draft a formal constitution in 2011 (ratified at the 2013 AGM) and has become a more formal learned society.

== History ==
The society was founded in July 2003 by Dr Cheng Yu and several guqin enthusiasts. According to the society's website, the society aims to "promote interest in and understanding of Chinese musical culture and philosophy, [...] especially of the qin in the UK." The society had existed before then in an inchoate form with a group of qin players having irregular yaji. Then in 2003, the group of players decided to create a more formal society at the suggestion of Gong Yi (who was visiting the UK at the time), thereby creating Britain's first and only qin society.

The name of the society was arrived at after Gong Yi suggested 'London' sounded more cultured than 'UK' and upon Cheng Yu suggesting Youlan, (meaning "solitary orchid", the name of a famous guqin melody), Gong Yi informed her that that was the name of his daughter by coincidence.

The society is an offshoot of the UK Chinese Ensemble, also headed by Cheng, which includes the Silk String Quartet and other projects.

During 2009, it was decided that the Society would become more formal and adopt a new constitution to expand the Society's promotion as well as gain easier access to funding due to wide-ranging cuts in arts funding in recent years placing its summer school programmes in jeopardy. Plans were laid down in October of that year and in 2011 the Society officially became formal with its first AGM held in January of that year. A new committee was subsequently elected to support the Society's increased workload.

Since 2023, the society has increasingly moved away from being a society primarily about the guqin and has focused more on Chinese music in general, with much of the committee now involved with work and projects involving Cheng Yu's subsidiary arts company, China Arts Ltd.

== Meetings and activities ==
The main activities the society holds are regular bi-monthly yaji (informal gatherings of qin enthusiasts) (Note: One group, the Boston Qin Society, describes yaji as, "public performances and lectures called Yaji ... held with the hopes of educating and familiarizing the public with the art of guqin. Yaji focus not only on the musical tradition and repertoire of guqin but also on the traditions of various other Chinese arts.) as well as the occasional concert and the yearly guqin music summer school in association with (before 2011) the Asian Music Circuit at the Royal Academy of Music, London.

The early yaji were usually held at a house of a member, the majority of which was held in Twickenham. Since 2011, almost all yaji are now held at SOAS, with meetings moved temporarily online during the COVID-19 lockdowns.

Though it is primarily based in London, the society may hold meetings at other places in the UK for special occasions. One such meeting was held at Oxford University in 2004. On average, around 10 – 20 members attend for each meeting though for special events, such as when a famous qin master comes over from China, the number of attendees increase significantly.

A concert is held at least once a year, usually coinciding with the summer schools. Other than this, concerts are usually held to coincide with special events, sometimes at museum exhibitions or a festival etc.

The Society has an AGM in January every year and its meeting are mostly held at SOAS since 2011.

=== Summer schools ===
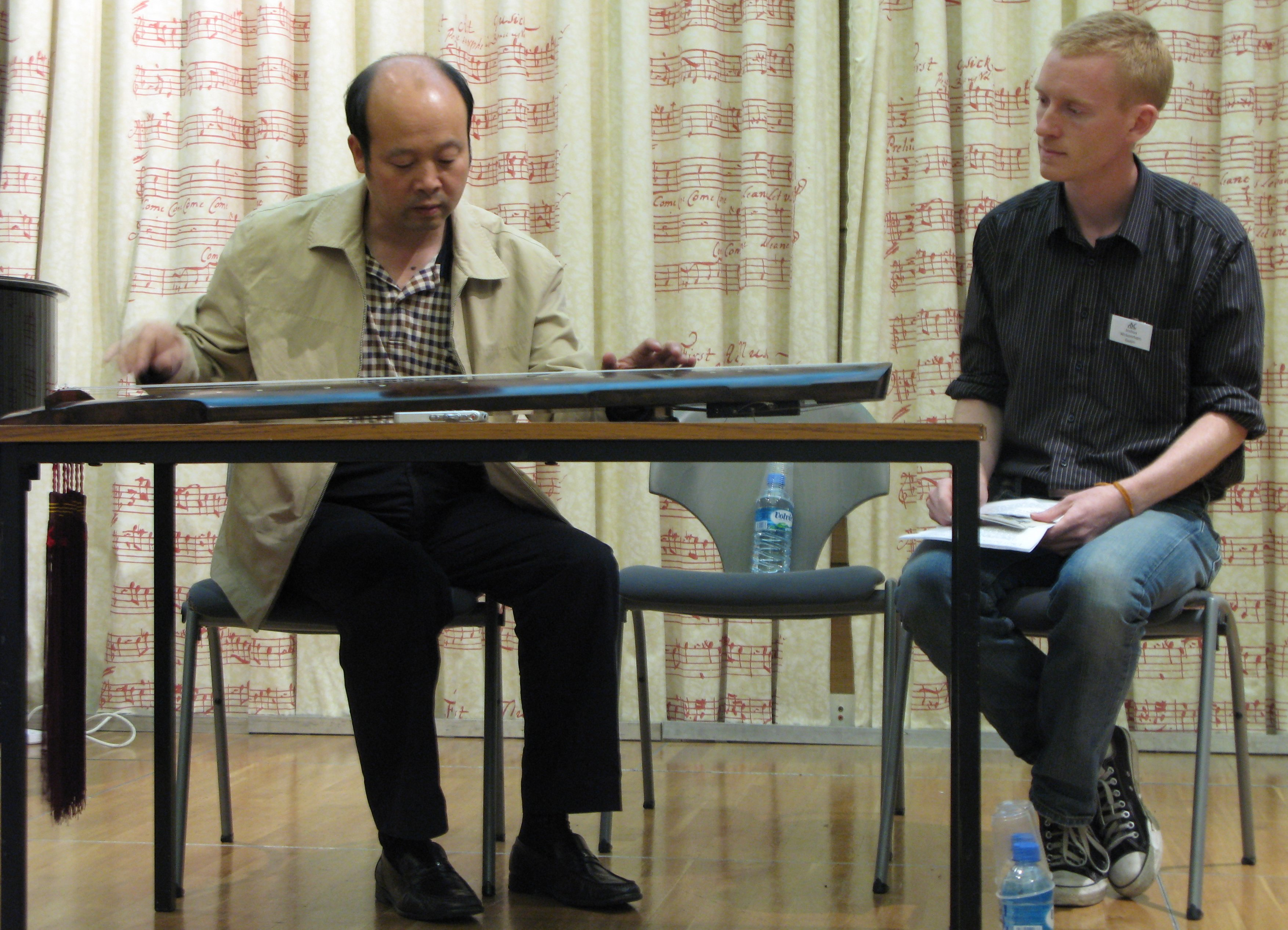
Zeng Chengwei (left) giving a talk at a Summer School.

The summer school in London is the Society's main event of the year, started in 2003. Each year, a qin master/player is invited to London to teach students for a week. So far, Prof. Li Xianting, Gong Yi, Prof. Zeng Chengwei and Dai Xiaolian have taught at the summer school, with Prof. Zeng becoming the most often. During these summer schools, there is the main Society yaji/anniversary/Congregation event of the year, attended by the professor, members of the Society and guests. The summer school is the only of its kind outside China to offer yearly tuition from qin masters from China.

Since 2011, the Society has a more direct involvement with organising summer schools and workshops independent of the AMC. Since 2013, due to timing constraints and/or funding issues, the Society began holding its summer schools at the Royal College of Music and, since 2015, the China Exchange without inviting over a qin player from China. The classes are now taught by Cheng Yu for the intermediate/advance class and (until after 2018) Charles Tsua for the beginners. On top of this, since 2016, there are seasonal weekly classes held at the London Fo Guang Shan Temple which is taught by Cheng Yu. During the COVID-19 pandemic, and subsequently after lockdown, classes are also held online via Zoom.

Since 2023, the summer school element has been integrated into an overall festival format, rather than as a standalone event.

=== The First London International Guqin Festival 2018 ===
In 2017, the Society decided to organise and host an international guqin festival in London in the summer of 2018. They received an Arts Council grant and the Festival was held between 20 and 26 August to great success. Special invited guests included the masters Zeng Chengwei and his son Zeng He as their families and students, Li Xiangting, and Marie-Anne Souloumiac van Gulik (granddaughter of Robert Hans van Gulik).

The Festival consisted of a 4-day summer school, taught by Zeng Chengwei (advance class), Zeng He (intermediate), Charles Tsua (beginners), and Cheng Yu (post-beginners), a 2-day conference, 2 masterclasses (taught by Zeng Chengwei and Li Xianting), a film screening, and a tour of 4 concerts (Oxford, Cambridge and two in London).

The Festival drew in participants from around the globe, including Germany, Canada, Taiwan, China, Norway, America, as well as local UK people.

=== The First London International Chinese Music Festival 2023 ===
In 2023, the LYQS took on a different direction and held another festival, but the focus has shifted to Chinese music is general rather than just guqin music, co-organised through its sister organisation, UK Chinese Music. The festival took on a similar format of the previous guqin festival of 2018, which included the guqin conference, and was held largely at Goldsmiths, University of London. New additions included the graded examinations and competitions for Chinese musical instruments, held at SOAS. Li Fengyun and Wang Jianxin were invited as masters from China to teach and perform.

Subsequent summer schools would take on the festival format and move away from the guqin-only instrumental focus, with the LYQS becoming a partner organisation rather than the lead. The new festival format now includes around five concerts, and a graded examinations and competitions element, accredited by SOAS and a Chinese music association.

== Membership ==
Before 2011, the society comprises three permanently elected officers (President, Secretary and Treasurer though the office of last was never officially exercised due to the fact that the Society never charged a subscription fee or formally had any expenditure during this period), several artistic consultants and numerous ordinary members who were basically mailing list subscribers. Since 2011, a committee was set up consisting of three officers as previous and three ordinary committee members, several non-executive officers and patrons in addition to the ordinary subscribing membership.

Membership is open to all who have an interest in music, particularly the music of the guqin, or are qin players/musicians. Members receive regular mailings via e-mail about the society's activities and important upcoming events. There is no formal requirement for members to attend any of the meetings or yaji but they must, beginning January 2011, pay a subscription fee.

There were two levels of membership: Full and Associate. Associate membership is aimed at those living outside the UK and may not be able to attend meetings or participate in events and activities as easily and/or regularly as those who reside within the UK (they are primarily barred from voting or standing for elections and have no access to the Society's library and resources). The Associate membership was eventually abolished and now only Full membership exists.

=== Executive committee ===
Committee members are elected every three years and consist of the President, Secretary, Treasurer, four Ordinary Members and several Non-executive Officers.

The current President is:

- Dr Cheng Yu, MMus, PhD (2003–2010, then re-elected in 2011 and for subsequent terms, except for 2023-2025)

=== Patrons ===
Formerly called Consultants and then Advisers to the Society before formalisation.

- Prof. Li Xianting
- Gong Yi
- Hu Feifei (former Secretary of the Prince's Charities Foundation, China)
