= Cheng Yu (musician) =

Chinese musician

- Chinese: 程玉
Transcriptions
Standard Mandarin
- Hanyu Pinyin: Chéng Yù

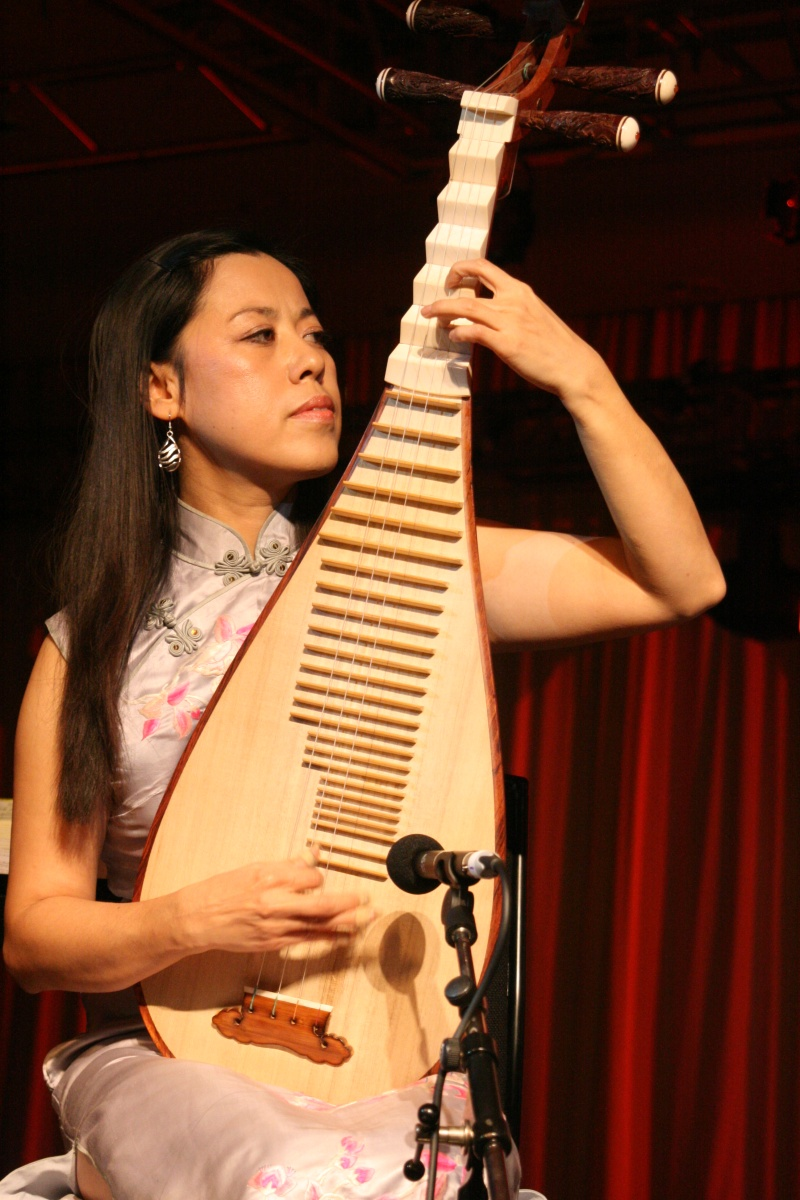
Cheng Yu playing the P'ipa

Cheng Yu is a Chinese musician, known as a performer of the pipa, a Chinese four-stringed lute,

She gained a BMus in China and an MMus in the United Kingdom. She completed her PhD studies at the School of Oriental and African Studies (SOAS) in London on Ancient Xi'an Music.

She plays, records and researches on traditional and contemporary Chinese music as well as cross-cultural music collaborations in the UK, Europe and other places. In 2005, she re-created a modern version of the lost Tang dynasty five-stringed pipa, based on the study of old Tang dynasty pipas and lutes from the East Asian cultures.

She is one of the founding members of the UK Chinese Ensemble (established in 1998) and of the London Youlan Qin Society (inaugurated in 2003).

== Biography ==
Cheng Yu was born in Beijing, but grew up in Gansu Province in Northwest China when her family was exiled during the Cultural Revolution. She studied the southern Pudong style of pipa with her father from the age of seven and was further trained by pipa masters in the north-western Pinghu style later. She also studied and graduated with distinction in the Xi'an Conservatory of Music in 1987 for the guqin. She won the "outstanding pipa player" award in China in the same year she was selected as a pipa soloist in the China Central Orchestra of Chinese Music in Beijing.

== Collaborations and projects ==
- Asian Music Circuit: Chinese Music Summer School from 2003
- ARC Music
- SOAS
- Music House
- Zomba
- Extreme Music
- Realworld
- Damon Albarn
- Monkey: Journey to the West
- Tan Dun
- Chen Yi
- Xu Yi
- Barrington Pheloung
- Randy Edelman
- Karl Jenkins
- Trevor Jones
- Fabien Tehericsen
- London Sinfonietta 1996
- Lyon Ensemble Orchestral Contemporian 2000-01
- Avignon Orchestra 2003
- Edinburgh String Quartet 2004
- Youth Music: Faber Music Songbook 2005
- Jan Kuiper
- Purbayan Chatterjee
- Zoumana Kiarra
- Jan Hendrickse
- Tim Garside
- Stephen Dydo
- Gillian Carcas
- Gyewon Byeon
