= North American Guqin Association =

The North American Guqin Association (Chinese: 北美琴社; often abbreviated to NAGA) is a guqin society based in the State of California, in the United States, which serves guqin players on the West Coast of the United States. Of the three major qin societies of the West (the other two being the London Youlan Qin Society and the New York Qin Society), this society was the world's largest English speaking online community for the guqin (before the advent of other social media platforms) and has the most connections and scope of activities.

== History ==
NAGA was founded by the qin player Wang Fei in 1997 who is the current director of the society. As of 2006, the society is recognized as a nonprofit organization under Section 501(c)(3) of the Internal Revenue Service.

NAGA is the only society outside China to be instrumental in instigating an official 'Guqin Day' in the city of Milpitas in 2007. The day was set on 7 November.

== Activities ==
NAGA organises regular yajis as well as excursions and events. This also includes classes for guqin and sometimes a qin master is invited over from China to teach for a few days. It is also represented by some members when they attend conferences and events in China.

It has also introduced an innovation called a yalon (an amalgamation of yaji and the French salon) as a gathering of Eastern and Western musical traditions.

== Membership ==
Membership, which essentially is a subscription to a mailing list, is open to all who have an interest in qin music and only requires an online registration. The society comprises 3 officers, several board members, consultants and numerous ordinary members. Members have the benefit of attending meetings and yaji (Note: One group, the Boston Qin Society, describes yaji as, "public performances and lectures called Yaji ... held with the hopes of educating and familiarizing the public with the art of guqin. Yaji focus not only on the musical tradition and repertoire of guqin but also on the traditions of various other Chinese arts.) (informal gatherings of qin enthusiasts) as well as special events which can take place in China. There are no membership fees or requirements.
