= Guqin construction =

The construction of the guqin Chinese zither is a complex process like any other musical instrument. However, there is much symbolism in the choice of materials, the shape or form of the instrument that are important things to consider when creating a qin.

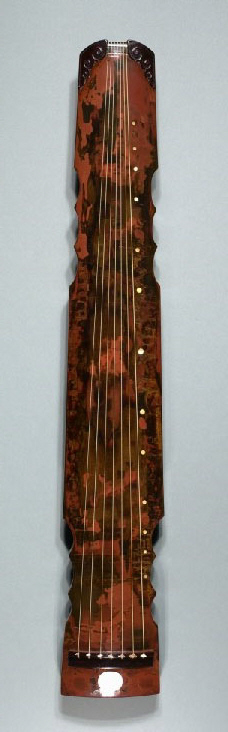
The qin Hewu Longxiang 《鶴舞龍翔》 in the Lianzhu form

== Design Overview ==
In simplistic terms, the guqin is an acoustic instrument consisting of a sound chamber formed by two long planks of wood glued together. One or both planks are carved inside to form a hollow chamber. On the underside of the instrument are sound holes. Strings are supported by a nut and bridge. Scale length is typically 43" to 44.5". The center of the top is used as a fingerboard and is arched to some degree. Inlays mark note positions on the fingerboard.

The instrument has feet on the underside to allow it to be played on a tabletop without blocking the sound holes. The underside also houses tuning pegs or tuners. The strings are traditionally made of silk but modern steel-on-silk strings are also used.

Names of (from left to right) the front, inside and back parts of the qin

== Details ==
As an instrument with millennia of history the guquin has an overwhelming amount of details, traditions, and variations. Some small amount of that information is collected here.

=== Materials ===
The sound chamber of the qin is constructed with two boards of wood, typically of differing wood types. The slightly rounded top board (soundboard) is usually made of tong wood 『桐』, the Chinese parasol tree, or Chinese paulownia. There are many different types of tong wood, the names of which are listed in the Yuguzhai Qinpu: wutong 『梧桐』 (Firmiana simplex), baitong 『白桐』, qingtong 『青桐』 (Japanese paulownia), paotong 『泡桐』 (Paulownia tomentosa), yitong 『椅桐』 and nantong 『南桐』; the best is wutong, but paotong is now widely used. The bottom board is made of zi mu 『梓木』 catalpa (Catalpa ovata) or, more recently, nan mu 『楠木』 camphor wood (Machilus nanmu). The wood must be well seasoned, that is, the sap and moisture must be removed (of the top board wood). If sap remains then it will deaden the sound and, as the moisture evaporates, the wood will warp and crack. Some makers use old or ancient wood to construct qins because most of the sap and moisture has been removed naturally by time (old shan mu 『杉木』, "Chinese fir", Chinese Cunninghamia or Japanese Cryptomeria, is often used for creating modern qins). Some go to lengths to obtain extremely ancient wood, such as that from Han dynasty tomb structures or coffins. Although such wood is very dry, it is not necessarily the best since it may be infected with wood worm or be of inferior quality or type. Many modern qins made out of new tong wood (such as those made by Zeng Chengwei) can surpass the quality of antique qins. Unfortunately, the supply of good wood to make qins has dwindled in recent years, causing a rush to make more qins. Paulownia takes many years to grow and requires a curing period of at least 20 years for the sap and moisture to be properly removed. As for old wood from old houses, there are not much old houses left after modernization of the cities and towns.

The names of the woods used are not exact but ambiguous and one name could be used to name a variety of different woods, or a wood may have several different names.

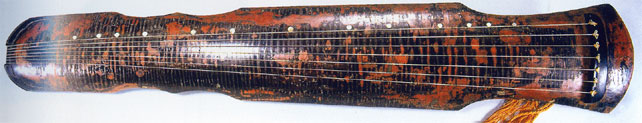
Jiu Xiao Huan Pei 《九霄環佩》: The famous Tang dynasty qin in the Fuxi form by Lei Wei

=== Construction Process ===
There are two sound holes in the bottom board, as the playing techniques of the qin employ the entire surface of the top board which is curved / humped. The inside of the top board is hollowed out to a degree (if the board is too thick, then the sound will be dull and deadened; if the board is too thin, the sound will be too bright and loud). Inside the qin, there are 'nayin' 『納音』 sound absorbers to reinforce the sound, and a 'tian chu' 『天柱』 and 'di chu' 『地柱』 soundposts that connect the bottom board to the top (which act as sound reinforcers but also anti-warping devices). The boards are joined using a "hinge joint" method to produce the typically mellow sounds of the qin. Lacquer 『漆』 from the Chinese lacquer tree (Rhus verniciflua) is then applied to the surfaces of the qin, mixed with various types of matrix, the most common being "lujiao shuang" 『鹿角霜』, the remains of deer antler after the glue has been extracted. Often, ceramic powder is used instead of deer antler powder, but the quality is not as good. After the lacquer has dried (a qin will need several layers), the surface will be polished using oil stones. At the head end of the instrument is the "yue shan" 『岳山』 or bridge, and at the other end is the "long yin" 『龍齦/龙龈』 (dragon's gums) or nut. There are 13 circular mother-of-pearl inlays which mark the harmonic positions, as well as a reference point to note position, called hui 『徽』 ("insignia"). They are roughly the same size, but the 7th hui in the middle is usually slightly bigger. If the hui are too big, then it is considered vulgar or ugly. The book Yugu Zhai Qinpu is perhaps the most famous book that describes in detail the construction method of the qin.

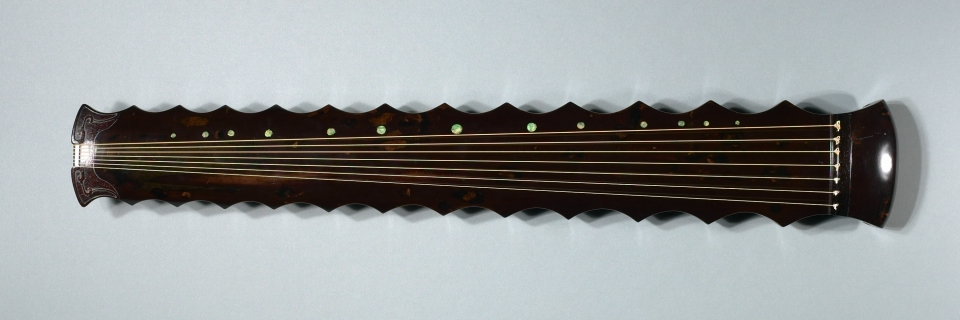
The distinctive form of the Luoxia style, noticeably difficult to create

=== Storage Considerations ===
Generally, the qin should be stored in an appropriate climate. That is, a constant environment. Sudden changes may cause it to warp or split at the joint. Generally, the appropriate climate to keep a qin in depends on where it is manufactured (mostly, in China, which is humid). The air temperature is best at around 20-24°C, with a humidity of around 50-70%. If the temperature is too high, then the glue may melt or soften, causing the joints to split (in the worst case, the edge of the qin cracks open). If the humidity drops too low, typically below 25-30%, then the wood may warp and/or crack, either internally or externally, and maybe the joints could split. Some players, particularly in dry countries or in countries that have a very dry summer, obtain a humidifier to protect the qin from damage by correcting the humidity level of the room in which the qin is stored.

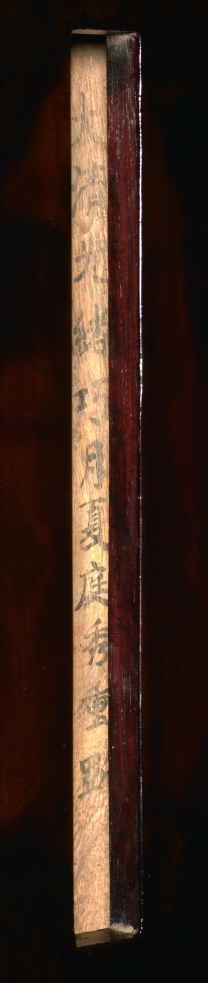

The qin must always be placed vertically and not horizontally (i.e. resting on the goose feet and/or tuning pegs), otherwise the qin would gradually curve, making it unplayable. That is why the preferred way to store a qin is to hang it up on a wall, away from sunlight. The weight of the instrument pulls it straight and stops it from curving (though it might curve or wrap anyway if the climate is not constant or the wood is not sufficiently seasoned or cured).

Sometimes, the player may attempt minor repairs to the instrument (major repairs like structural faults and splitting of the joints, warping of the wood, etc. are best done by professional qin makers). Minor repairs include re-lacquering areas of the surface of the qin that have had the lacquer chipped, re-patching areas of the surface where the lacquer is worn causing "running-cloud markings", repairing cracks in lacquer, etc. Because these are relatively minor and can often happen due to ageing and constant use, it is more easier to do repairs by oneself than call a qin maker to do it, especially if there isn't a qin maker available to do the work. Small quantities of lacquer and deer horn powder (known as 『角粉（つのこ）』 "tsunoko" in Japanese) are available to purchase online by the player to carry out simple repairs.

== Symbolism ==
According to tradition, the qin originally had five strings, representing the five elements of metal, wood, water, fire and earth. Later, in the Zhou dynasty, Zhou Wen Wang (周文王) added a sixth string to mourn his son, Bo Yihou (伯邑考). His successor, Zhou Wu Wang, added a seventh string to motivate his troops into battle with the Shang. The thirteen hui 『徽』 on the surface represent the 13 months of the year (the extra 13th is the 'leap month' in the lunar calendar). This is a traditional explanation, however the positions of the hui represent just intoned harmonic positions derived from the natural overtone series and form the basic system of universal consonance related to the fundamental tone. The surface board is round to represent Heaven and the bottom board flat to represent earth. The entire length of the qin (in Chinese measurements) is 3 chi, 6 cun and 5 fen (approx. 136 cm)「三尺六寸五分」; representing the 365 days of the year (though this is just a standard since qins can be shorter or longer depending on the period's measurement standard or the maker's preference). Each part of the qin has meaning, some more obvious, like "dragon pool" 『龍池/龙池』 and "phoenix pond" 『鳳沼/凤沼』.

== Forms ==
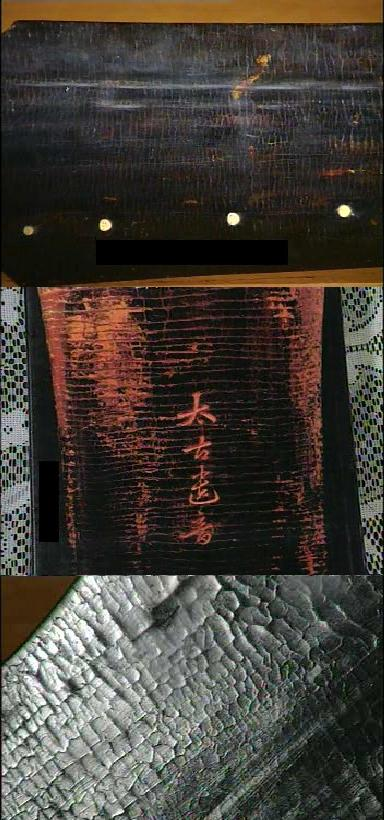
Examples of duanwen. Top to bottom: Flowing-water markings with running-cloud markings 『流水行雲紋』, snake-skin cracks 『蛇腹斷』, ice-crack markings 『冰裂紋』

Qin forms are shapes or styles which a qin can be made in. In the Wuzhi Zhai Qinpu there is a large number of qin forms listed with their origins. The most popular form is the Zhongni 「仲尼式」 form, which is named after Confucius' style-name. It is the most simple yet elegant. Other popular forms include the Fuxi 「伏羲式」 form which was popularlised by the famous Tang qin Jiuxiao Huanpei, which is difficult to create to an elegant standard. There is the Lianzhu 「連珠式/连珠式」 form and the distinctively attractive forms of Luoxia 「落霞式」 ("falling mist"), Cijun 「此君式」 ("this gentleman") or "bamboo" and Jiaoye 「蕉葉式/蕉叶式」 ("banana leaf") forms. Although there is a dizzying array of forms a maker can use (which includes some rather bizarre ones), generally, makers stick to more usual and popular forms. This is because not only are they easier to make, but because changing the outer shape can alter the shape and volume of the soundbox considerably, and the more chunks and indentations on the outer shape, the smaller the soundbox becomes.

There is also a special construction process called baina 『百衲』 (literally "hundred patches") which uses around a hundred or so small pieces of wood, in square or diamond shapes, fitted and stuck together, then carved into a qin. This method is used by only a few makers. One of the properties claimed by making a qin in such a way is that the sound can emit more easily out of the instrument. Unfortunately, the glue holding the pieces could melt in a bad climate condition and may go through a lot of repair work due to the nature of the structure before it stabilizes.

=== Duanwen ===
On the surface of the qin there may be cracks or patternations called duanwen 〔斷紋/断纹〕. These cracks appear after a long period of time due to ageing. The wood's water content slowly evaporates, so the wood retracts; the lacquer, however, does not, so it cracks. It should be distinguished from cracking or warping from the wood, which creates structural cracks. Duanwen are highly prized by the qin connoisseur because they not only prove the qin's antiquity (to a certain degree of error), but are also pleasant to look at. There are many names for different cracks, such as "snake-skin cracks" 『蛇腹斷』, "ice-crack markings" 『冰裂紋』, "cow-hair cracks" 『牛毛斷』, "flowing-water markings" 『流水紋』, "running-cloud markings" 『行雲紋』, "tortoise-back markings" 『龜背紋/龟背纹』, "plum-blossom cracks" 『梅花斷』, etc. Modern qin makers can artificially create cracks by first heating the lacquered qin for a few hours until it is hot, then immersing it in a bath of ice cubes, thus the wood retracts quickly causing cracks on the surface of the qin (this is not a new method). Of course, this method does not create the best of cracks. Although a qin may have duanwen, one can still play it, providing the duanwen is not flaking off or lifting off the surface. Otherwise, it would have to be re-lacquered, partially if the flaking is not too severe, entirely if it is literally unplayable. Qin makers tend to avoid removing the old lacquer when re-lacquering and maintain as much of the duanwen as possible since real duanwen cannot be created overnight but through centuries of natural ageing. Some makers when re-lacquering would use a different hue or colour of lacquer so that the lacquer underneath can contrast with the new, and thus be seen more clearly. The colour of the lacquer used can range from extreme black to brown to purple to red (in the rarest cases). Colour is achieved by using minerals or chemicals added to the processed lacquer. The most beautiful duanwen are, understandably, from old antique qins.

Another property of duanwen is that the lacquer does not stick to the wood so tightly, therefore, the sound is not restricted as in a newly lacquered qin.

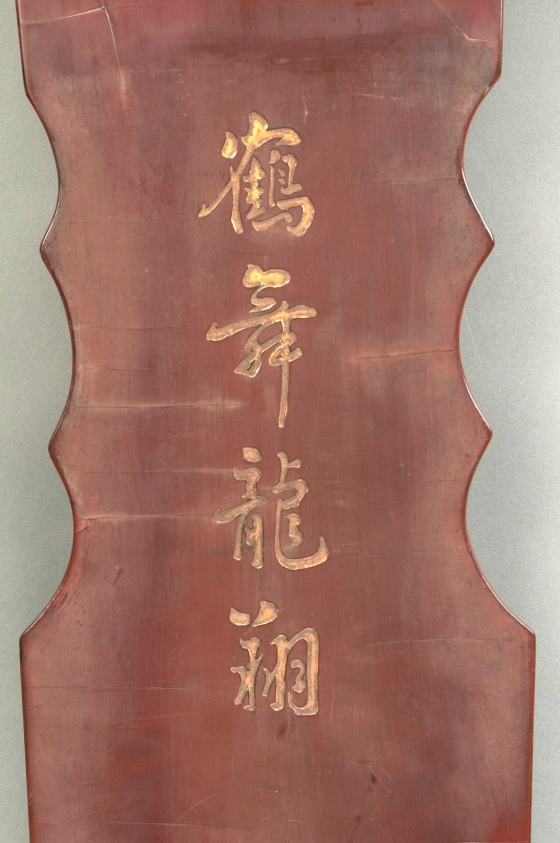
The back of the Hewu Longxiang qin with its name inscription

=== Inscriptions and seals ===
Other than the form and the duanwen of the qin, the qin player may marvel at the inscriptions at the back of the qin. These will be names, poems, dates of manufacture, seals and other artistic inscriptions. Of course, some qins have 'no name' on them, or are plain. Some think that there is no need to adorn the qin with written words, the sound should speak for itself. Most would just write the name and date inside the qin. However, carving inscriptions into the back of the qin is an art form in itself. It is a point of admiration to the qin, and collectors may add their own inscriptions on the qin, much like they would do to a piece of Chinese painting that they praise highly. Inscriptions can be used to date the qin as well, since most makers brush in their names and years of manufacture, mostly inside the soundhole, on the sound absorber or next to it. A calligrapher may be called in to compose a piece and that will be copied onto the qin.

The name given to the qin may reflect its sound quality, or reflect an ideal or philosophical musing. It may be the name of a piece of qin music or a mode or tuning. The seal/s are often the maker's seals, often large and square, but the owner may add their own.

== Footnotes ==
1. The scientific names can be misleading as the Chinese use different names for the same wood, or use one name for different woods.
2. Chu, Fengjie. Yugu Zhai Qinpu 【與古齋琴譜】. Volume 2 Chapter 2.
3. Zhou, Zi'an. Wuzhi Zhai Qinpu 【五知齋琴譜】. Volume 1, folio 2, leaves 1-14.
4. Chu, Fengjie. Yugu Zhai Qinpu 【與古齋琴譜】. Volume 3 Chapter 7.
