= Shu school =

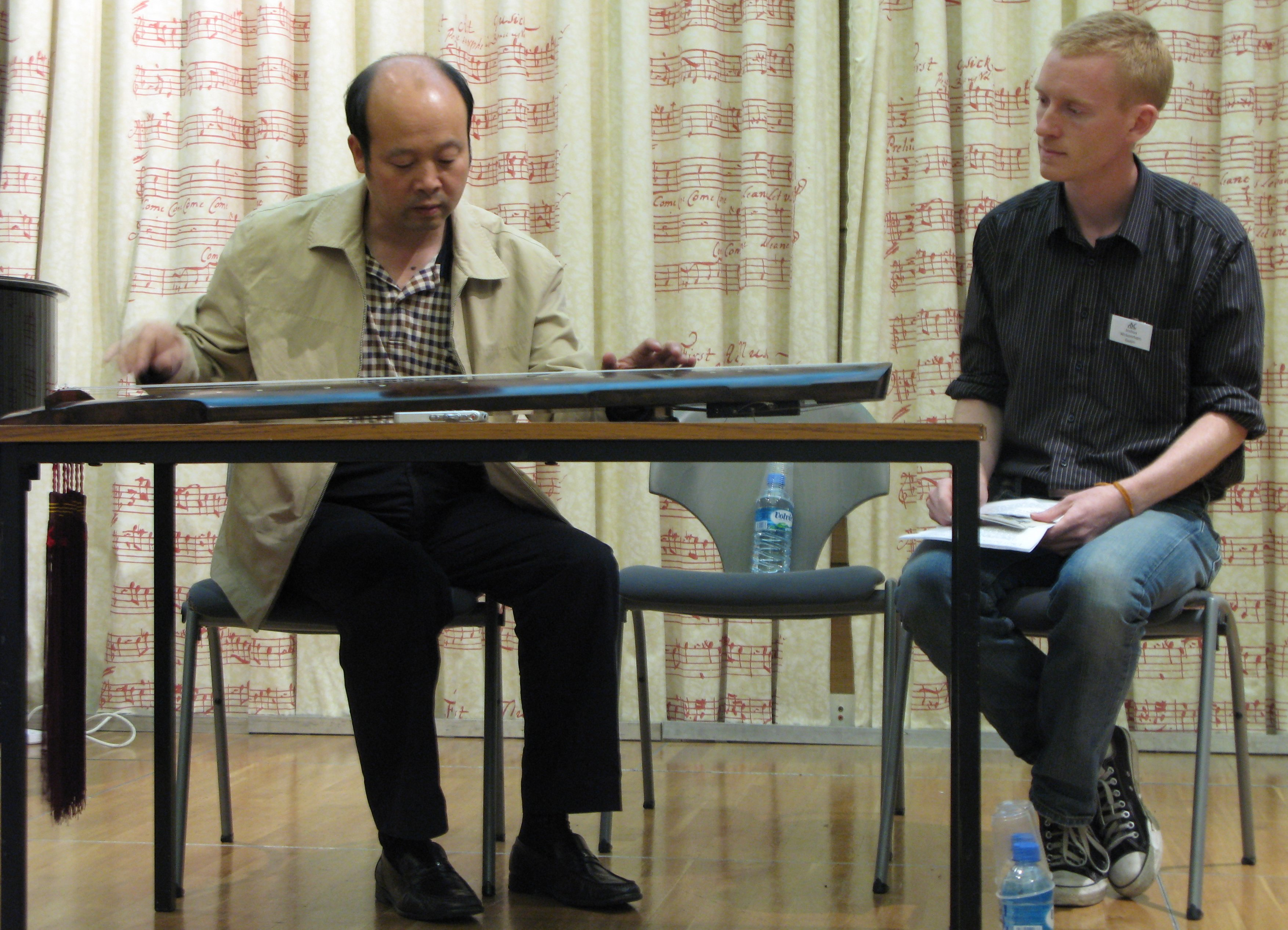
Zeng Chengwei (left), one of the main transmitters of the Shu School of the modern era.

The Shu School of Qin Music (蜀派古琴) refers to the modern guqin regional performance style tradition and lineage begun in the mid-19th century by its founder, Zhang Kongshan. The "Shu" name derives from the main base of operations at the time, namely the Sichuan region of China. Today, the Shu School has many branches and lineages, most of which trace their foundation to Zhang Kongshan, though the term is equally applied to Sichuan-based players in general.

== History ==
The Sichuan qin players, as early as the Tang dynasty, was perceived as having qin play characterised by rushing, tumbling energy.

=== Zhang Kongshan ===
The modern form of the school was largely founded by Zhang Kongshan in the mid-19th century; his inheritors have been very numerous.

As the Sichuan style fanned out into other areas of China (as it seemed to do rather successfully in the early 20th century), it became known as "Fanchuan", whose connotation is something like "Chuan – Everywhere".

== Name nomenclature ==
There is a debate as to whether the "Shu" (蜀) appellation is an accurate designation for the school/style in question. Some people prefer "Chuan" (川) as this distinguishes it from the old historical "Shu School" which is totally unrelated to the modern guise. "Fanchuan" (泛川) gained credence after being coined by Zha Fuxi and is applied generally to any Shu style player not residing in Sichuan but has generally been applied indiscriminately, even to players with little association or connection with Sichuan or the modern Shu School in general.

Presently, the only players to use the "Shu" appellation are from the main branches of the Zhang Kongshan lineage, especially the Ye branch, e.g. Zeng Chengwei. "Chuan" is generally used by players not of the main Zhang Kongshan lineage but residing roughly in the Sichuan area or have connections with it.

== Style ==
Historically, the Shu style is described in literature as "restlessly fast and unrestrained, with magnificence of momentum" (躁急奔放、氣勢宏偉). This is due to the nature of the environment which Sichuan is, with high mountains, deep valleys and fast flowing rivers, which are the main influences for the players and composers of the music.

== Melodies and Qinpu ==
The magnum opus and foundation document of the modern Shu School is the Tianwen Ge Qinpu (天聞閣琴譜, "Qin Codex of the Pavilion of Heavenly Sounds"), published in 1876 under the auspices of Zhang Kongshan and his associate, Tang Yiming, and his student, Ye Jiefu. The Tianwen Ge is not only the largest collection of qin melodies ever published in a single publication currently in existence but also it contains many other useful data related to qin lore and construction. Most of the melodies were in the active repertoire of his students and came from many sources. Some were compositions whilst around nine melodies were edited and rearranged by Zhang during his years in Sichuan. Out of these nine, the most influential melody was that of "Liu Shui" (流水) or "Flowing Water".

== Branches ==
There are two branches: one branch through Ye Jiafu whose lineage is embodied by Zeng Chengwei, and the other is through Gu Yucheng whose lineage was embodied by Gu Meigeng. Other than those two main branches, there are others such as the "Ba Lineage" which is not a direct line from Zhang Kongshan.

=== Lineage tree ===
Below is a construction of the lines and branches from the transmission of Zhang Kongshan. Due to limitations of space and lack of information, not all transmitters are included.

曹錡(稚雲); Cao Zhiyun	馮彤雲; Feng Tongyun
唐彜銘(松仙/軒); Tang Yiming act. 1860s—?	張合修(孔山); Zhang Kongshan c.1830—1905	錢綬詹; Qian Shouzhan
釋竹禪(法號熹); Monk Zhuchan; 1824—1900	華陽顧氏傳承系; The Gu branch of Huayang	成都葉氏傳承系; The Ye branch of Chengdu	楊紫東; Yang Zidong	霸派傳承系; The Ba School lineage
彭莜香; Peng Youxiang act. 1875—1898	顧玉成(號少庚); Gu Yucheng; 1837—1906	歐陽書唐; Ouyang Shutang	譚銘(石門); Tan Shimen	葉介福; Ye Jiefu	蘇天培; Su Tianpei
彭慶濤(祉卿); Peng Zhiqing; 1891—1944	顧雋(哲卿); Gu Juan; 1879—1949	顧煢(卓群); Gu Qiong; 1881—1936	顧熙(勁秋); Gu Xi; 1836—	葉婉貞; Ye Wanzhen	張伯龍; Zhang Bolong	蘇雯; Su Wen
顧燾(梅羹); Gu Meigeng; 1899—1990	廖文甫; Liao Wenfu	楊厚庵; Yang Hou'an
顧澤長(琴禪); Gu Zezhang; 1941—	顧淡如; Gu Danru	朱默涵; Zhu Mohan; 1963—	丁承運; Ding Chengyun; 1944—	喻瑉(紹唐); Yu Shaotang; 1901—?	喻潤(紹澤); Yu Shaoze; 1903—1988	葉伯和之母; Ye Bohe's mother	裴鐵俠(雪琴); Pei Tiexia; 1884—1950	龍琴舫; Long Qinfang; 1886—?	陳蘊儒; Chen Wenru; 1874—?
顧永祥; Gu Yongxiang; 1982—	新都魏氏傳承系; The Wei branch of Xindu	喻文燕; Yu Wenyan; 1941—	曾成偉; Zeng Chengwei; 1958—	葉伯和; Ye Bohe; 1889—1945	王華德; Wang Huade; 1922—2008	江嘉祐; Jiang Jiayou; 1942—	俞伯蓀; Yu Bosun; 1922—2013
魏莫愚; Wei Moyu	龍藏寺傳承系; The Longzang Temple branch	戴(代)茹; Dai Ru	曾河; Zeng He; 1988—	俞秦琴; Yu Qinqin
魏智儒; Wei Zhiru	釋含澈(雪堂); Monk Hanche; 1824—1900	釋星槎(融琢); Monk Xingcha; 1854—?
魏光綽; Wei Guangchuo	釋月泉; Monk Yuequan	劉應琨; Liu Yingkun
什邡劉氏傳承系; The Liu branch of Shifang
魏宗鉞; Wei Zongyue	劉仲勳; Liu Zhongxun
魏秉虔; Wei Bingqian	劉兆澤; Liu Zhaoze	劉兆新; Liu Zhaoxin; 1918—?	劉兆甫; Liu Zhaofu	秦甬椿; Qin Yongchun
魏學良; Wei Xueliang	劉世復; Liu Shifu	劉世鴻; Liu Shihong; 1949—	秦甬椿之子; Qin Yongchun's son
