= Lui Tsun-Yuen =

Lui Tsun-Yuen 呂振原
- Also known as: Tsun-Yuen Lui
- Born: 1931; Shanghai, China
- Died: January 8, 2008 (aged 76–77)
- Genres: Chinese classical music
- Occupations: Musician, composer, teacher
- Instruments: pipa, guqin
- Years active: 1954–1991
- Labels: Lyrichord

Lui Tsun-Yuen (Chinese: 呂振原; pinyin: Lǚ Zhènyuán; 1931 – January 8, 2008) was a Chinese composer and teacher of Chinese classical music. He is known for his compositions and recordings of the pipa and guqin, and is recognized for bringing Chinese music to Western audiences.

== Early life ==
Lui Tsun-Yuen was born in Shanghai. Though practitioners of music, Lui's grandfather worked as a doctor and his father sold mercantile goods. At the age of ten, Lui took up the study of classical stringed instruments, namely the pipa (a four-stringed lute) and the guqin (sometimes called the qin, chin, or "Chinese zither"). His guqin teachers included Wu Jinglüe and Hou Zuowu.

As a youth, Lui traveled around China to study with many generations of musicians. His brother Lui Pui-Yuen (呂培原, b. 1933) was also tutored in stringed instruments, and would later found the Chinese Orchestra of Hong Kong.

== Career beginnings ==
Lui graduated from Shanghai's King Yee College in 1953 with a degree in general education. In 1954 he left the People's Republic of China to work in Hong Kong. While there he performed at recitals and on the radio. In 1957 he moved to Brazil to work for a company run by a friend of the family. While there he made appearances on television, performed for by Brazil's Ministry of Education, and participated in the 1958 São Paulo Music Festival.

In 1959 Lui decided to leave the business world, declaring that he "would rather be a poor musician than a rich merchant." He traveled to the United States for a series of performances, beginning with the Interval Concert Series at New York's Carnegie Hall. He also began recording material for the Lyrichord record label, who released Lui's first LP Chinese Classical Masterpieces for the Pipa and Chin in 1960. In 1961 a full U.S. tour included university engagements at Brown, Chicago, Columbia, Harvard, Princeton, Stanford, Wesleyan, and Yale. He also traveled to London, where he cut a record for the BBC's permanent collections and soon gained a reputation as the premier ambassador of solo pipa to the West.

Lui briefly fell in with the American popular genre known as exotica and played as part of a Las Vegas stage show called "Oriental Holiday". He also adapted western musical compositions for the pipa, such as his transcription of the English folk ballad "Greensleeves". During his career he also appeared on Pacifica Radio, PBS and the Steve Allen Show.

== Teaching and later career ==
In March 1961, Lui accepted a position at the University of California, Los Angeles (UCLA), where he taught in the Department of Ethnomusicology and Systematic Musicology. At UCLA, Lui began as an associate teacher of Chinese music, classical dance, and opera. In 1964 he began lecturing on the history and theory of Chinese music, and eventually sat on committees that reviewed theses and dissertations for masters and doctorate degrees in ethnomusicology. His teaching work was interspersed with performances at the Guggenheim Museum, Hollywood Bowl, Library of Congress, and a tour to Europe, as well as recording sessions that amounted to five albums of music during the 1960s. The American String Teachers' Association sponsored Lui for a demonstration of pipa with guitarist Andrés Segovia. In the late 1960s, Lui sometimes opened for rock music acts such as Jerry Lee Lewis, Sweetwater, and The Doors.

In addition to playing classical compositions, Lui also wrote and recorded new music for the pipa. Being in Los Angeles, he also composed and performed incidental music for seven Hollywood films, as well as Chinese cinema. A 1967 tour took him back to Asia, with stops in Japan, Hawaii, Taiwan, and Hong Kong. Around 1972, Lui met, then married Lü Hong (吕红), a professional singer from Hong Kong, and the daughter of the noted Cantonese musician Lü Wencheng (吕文成, 1898-1981), while she was in the U.S. for a tour. Lui's brother Pui-Yuen joined him in Los Angeles in 1973 after teaching Chinese classical music at UC Berkeley, Brown University, and Loyola Marymount University. The two frequently performed together.

Lui retired from academia in 1991, after 30 years at UCLA. At the retirement reception, UCLA's dean of the College of Fine Arts presented Lui with a commemorative gold medal.

== Legacy ==
Lui died in January 2008. In 2016 his family established a $20,000 scholarship fund in his honor.

== Discography ==
- Chinese Classical Masterpieces for Pipa and Chin (Lyrichord, 1960)
- Exotic Music of Ancient China (Lyrichord, 1964)
- China's Treasures: Lui Tsun-Yuen Plays Pipa and Chin (Lyrichord, 1965)
