= Jinyu Qin Society =

Chinese guqin society

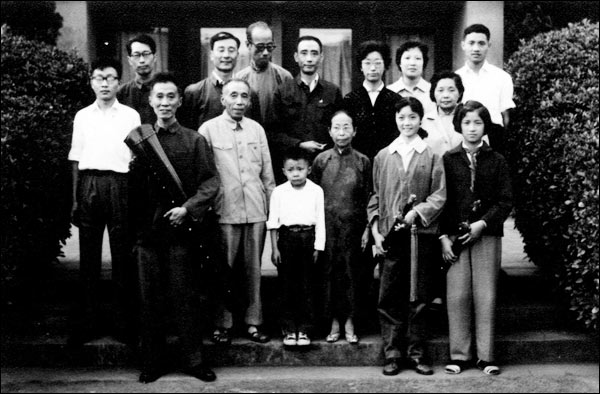
Group photo of the society in 1961

The Jinyu Qin Society (Chinese: 今虞琴社; pinyin: Jīnyú Qín Shè) is a guqin society founded in Suzhou in 1936. Its founders included Zha Fuxi, Zhang Ziqian, Xu Yuanbai, and other famous contemporary guqin players. It also had a journal, entitled Jinyu, which was only published once.

== History ==
Zha Fuxi, along with 28 others, established this society on March 1, 1936, and held a yaji the same day.

On December 27, they founded a branch in Shanghai. Because there were more players in Shanghai, this branch started to become more important than its former headquarters. They published the journal Jinyu in October 1937, and sent all the copies to other players in the country without any charge. Due to the outbreak of the Second Sino-Japanese War, the journal was never published again. In the meantime, the society did a survey that suggested there were only 112 guqin players in the whole country at the time, as most of these players were born to noble families.

Because the Japanese Army occupied Shanghai, the founders fled to different places in order to escape the violence, after which they were hardly ever able to reorganise it again. It was totally closed down after the outbreak of the Cultural Revolution, but was reestablished in 1980 when Zhang Ziqian became the first president.
