= New York Qin Society =

Organization

The New York Qin Society (Chinese: 紐約琴社; sometimes abbreviated as NYQS) is a guqin society based in New York, New York in America, serving guqin players on the East Coast of the United States. Of the three major qin societies in the West (the other two being the North American Guqin Association and the London Youlan Qin Society), this society is the most formally structured with a formal agreement of rules and a more learned society approach to selecting members.

== History ==
The society was founded in 2000 by Taiwan guqin player Yuan Jung-ping and other players.

The Society has regular activities, including music gatherings, workshops and concerts throughout the year.

The Society has both a website and a Facebook page.

== Membership ==
The Society especially welcomes qin players as members, but it is also open to anyone with an interest in qin music or the "Way of the Qin". Guests are welcome at meetings, which occur about once every two months, and can be nominated for membership by an existing member, usually after attending three meetings. As of 2021 there were 27 full-time members, including four officers, with an annual membership fee of $25.

=== Officers ===
- Current President: Peiyou Chang
- Founding President: Yuan Jung-ping (an honorary position in homage to his contributions to the society)

== Notes ==
1. Called the New York Qin Society Agreement: On website
2. New York Qin Society Members Web page
3. Since 2021.
