= International Directory of Guqin Teachers =

The International Directory of Guqin Teachers (simplified/traditional: 琴師通訊錄; pinyin: Qin Shi Tong Xun Lu) is a free internet-based directory of Guqin teachers all over the world. It started to publish on Jan 9th, 2012 and now the latest version was V3.9.0, which including 400 teachers over 12 countries and regions, e.g., China, Hong Kong, Macau, Taiwan, Japan, United States, UK, Singapore and Germany.

== Update Record ==
1. V1.0, about 2006-1-1
2. V2.0, about 2009-1-1
3. V3.0, about 2012-1-1,
4. V3.5, 2012-1-9 23:40:45
5. V3.6, 2012-1-12 9:45:19
6. V3.7, 2012-1-16 17:30:46
7. V3.8.4, 2012-3-24 14:18:54
8. V3.8.6, 2012-4-5 19:57:01
9. V3.8.7, 2012-5-19 16:25:12
10. V3.8.8, 2012-6-28 9:50:05
11. V3.8.9, 2012-9-9 22:13:52

== See also ==
- Guqin
