= Cheng Gongliang =

Chinese guqin player

- 成公亮
- Education: Shanghai Conservatory of Music

Cheng Gongliang (成公亮, August 1940－8 July 2015) sometimes also given as Cheng Gong Liang or Cheng Gong-liang, was a renowned guqin player in the Guangling style. Hailing from Yixing he was noted also for his writings on guqin playing and his compositions for the instrument, some of them drawing on other traditions of music. He taught from 1984 at the Nanjing Arts Institute, and lived in Nanjing for the rest of his life, though he travelled domestically and abroad to perform.
