= Lin Youren =

Chinese musician (1938–2013)

- Chinese: 林友仁
Transcriptions
Standard Mandarin
- Hanyu Pinyin: Lin Youren

Lin Youren (Chinese: 林友仁; August 11, 1938 – October 12, 2013) was a noted player of the Chinese musical instrument guqin. He was famous for his unaffected playing style. Lin also taught guqin at the Shanghai Conservatory of Music.

Lin was born on August 11, 1938, in Shanghai, China, but was brought up in nearby Nanjing. Early on in his musical development, Lin studied with Liu Shaochun (1901–1971). He entered the Shanghai Conservatory of Music in 1958 to study the guqin. He was influenced by the playing styles of Liu Jingshao, Gu Meigeng, Shen Caonong, and Wei Zhongle in particular. He graduated in 1963 and stayed at the Conservatory and began research on guqin history and Chinese music after returning from Heilongjiang in the early 1970s during the Cultural Revolution.

Lin gave guqin recitals in Taiwan, Hong Kong, Japan, France, the United Kingdom and the United States.

== Partial discography ==
- Appreciation of Tang Poetry Quatrains – 1995
- Music for the Qin Zither – 2000 (recorded in the UK)

== See also ==
Please see: References section in the guqin article for a full list of references used in all qin-related articles.
