= Tsar Teh-Yun =

Chinese guqin player (1905–2007)

- Born: 26 November 1905; Shanghai, China
- Died: 10 June 2007 (aged 101); Hong Kong
- Occupation: Guqin player

Tsar Teh-Yun (Chinese: 蔡德允; pinyin: Cai Deyun; 26 November 1905 – 10 June 2007) was a Chinese musician and poet who was among the leading guqin players of her time.

== Life and career ==
Tsar Teh-Yun was born on 26 November 1905 in Shuanglin Town (双林镇), Nanxun District, Huzhou, northern Zhejiang province, and moved with her parents to Shanghai at the age of 2. She later moved to Hong Kong with her husband and son. She became a well regarded guqin player, having been taught by Shen Caonong. Among her favorite repertoire to perform was pieces by Guo Chuwang. She was also a noted guqin teacher, and published a book on the instrument, Yinyinshi Qinpu. Tsar died on 10 June 2007 at the age of 101.

== Sources ==
- Yung, Bell (1998). The Last of China's Literati: The Music, Poetry and Life of Tsar Teh-yun. Hong Kong: Hong Kong University Press. ISBN 978-962-209-916-6.
