= Chinese traditional music =

Music genre

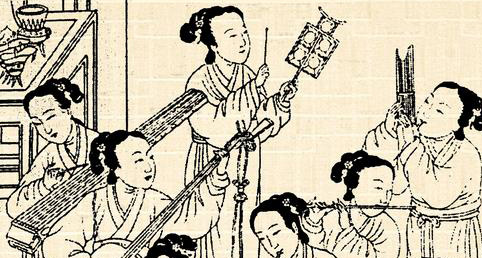
Female musicians performing Chinese classical music. Musician at left is playing a Chinese zither (probably a yaqin). Musician in foreground is playing a long-necked plucked lute (probably a sanxian). From larger ancient Chinese dynastic engraving in the public domain.

Chinese traditional music includes various music genres which have been inherited for generations in China. Specifically, this term refers to the music genres originated in or before Qing dynasty. According to the appearance, the genres can be classified into instrumental ensemble, instrumental solo, theatre, shuochang, dance music and song. It is now the primary classification in both research and education, although some genres contain different forms of performance and thus do not belong to a single category. The genres could also be classified into literati music, folk music, religious music and palace music, according to their cultural connotations or purpose.

== Instrumental ensemble ==
- Nanguan music
- Zhihua Temple Music
- Teochew string music
- Jiangnan sizhu

== Instrumental solo ==
- Guqin
- Pipa

== Theatre ==
- Kunqu
- Peking opera

== Dance music ==
- Muqam

== See also ==
- History of Chinese music
