= Zhe school (guqin) =

The Zhe school is a school of musicians for the guqin. It should not be confused with the Zhe school of landscape painters.
