= Wei Zhongle =

20th-century Chinese musician

Wei Zhongle 卫仲乐
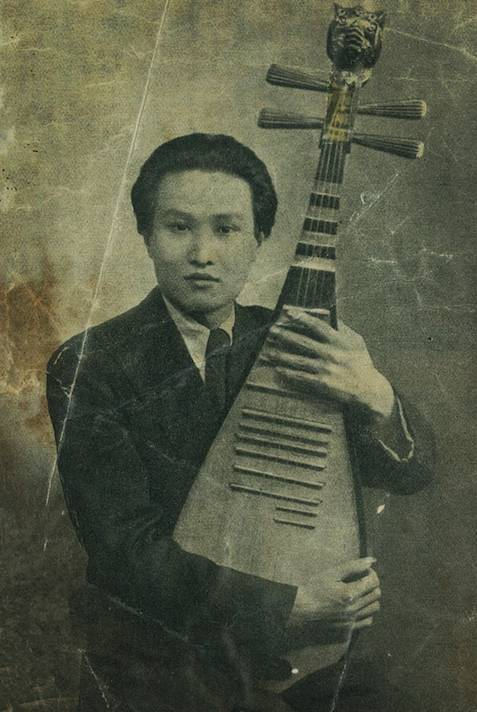
- Wei Zhongle

Background information
- Also known as: Chongfu 崇福
- Born: Bingtao 秉涛; 21 March 1908; Shanghai County, Jiangsu, Qing
- Died: 7 April 1997 (aged 89) Jing'an, Shanghai, China
- Genre: Chinese traditional music
- Occupation: instrumental musician
- Instruments: Pipa, guqin
- Years active: 1930s–1960s

Chinese name
- Traditional Chinese: 衛仲樂
- Simplified Chinese: 卫仲乐
Transcriptions
Standard Mandarin
- Hanyu Pinyin: Wèi Zhònglè
- Wade–Giles: Wei Chung Loh

Wei Zhongle, also romanized as Wei Chung-Loh or Wei Chung-Lok (simplified Chinese: 卫仲乐; traditional Chinese: 衛仲樂, 21 March 1908 – 7 April 1997), was a Chinese musical instrumentalist. He played a wide variety of traditional Chinese instruments, including pipa, guqin, erhu, xiao, and jinghu. He was nicknamed "Kreisler of Pipa", and was a member of the 2nd to the 6th National Committee of the People's Political Consultative Conference.

== Early life ==
Wei was born as Yin Bingtao (Chinese: 殷秉涛) in Shanghai County on 21 March 1908. Due to financial difficulty in his biological parents' household, he was adopted by a widow with the surname Wei, and was renamed Wei Chongfu. Starting in 1916, he enrolled in local schools, but dropped out in 1923 as the family could no longer afford tuition. He worked as an apprentice in several shops, and learnt to play xiao and flute in his free time.

In 1926, Wei became unemployed when the shop he worked at was closed. Later in the year, he joined Lelin Silk and Bamboo Society (Chinese: 乐林丝竹会) and Postal Union Chinese Orchestra (Chinese: 邮务工会国乐团). Wei joined a traditional Chinese music group called "Union Music Club" (Chinese: 大同乐会) in 1928, where he learnt to play guqin, pipa, violin and other instruments. The founder of the Society Zheng Jinwen (Chinese: 郑觐文) personally instructed Wei, and advised him to change his name to Wei Zhongle.

== Career ==
In 1933, he played the musical pieces Ambush from Ten Sides and The Moon over the River on a Spring Night in a documentary produced by Mingxing Film Company. On 21 May of the same year, he performed Ambush from Ten Sides again on the opening ceremony of the Grand Theatre. In March of the next year, Wei took part in the recording of the album The Drunken Fisherman (Chinese: 醉渔唱晚) by Pathé Records, which is the earliest recording of guqin performance. Following the death of Zheng Jinwen in 1935, Wei took over as the deputy director of Union Music Club. Later the same year, he joined the Chinese Music Research Association (Chinese: 中国音乐研究会) founded by Aaron Avshalomov, Shen Zhibai and Zhang Mei.

In July 1938, Wei was invited by the Hong Kong Women's War Disaster Relief Association (Chinese: 香港妇女救济兵灾会) to participate in charity performances along with Xu Guangyi, Luo Songquan and other musicians. They performed consecutively from August 6 to 7, and all proceeds were used to help the victims of the Second Sino-Japanese War. From 1938 to 1939, Wei traveled to the United States as part of a troupe, during which he performed a variety of instrumental solo and received the nickname "Kreisler of Pipa". He enrolled in Curtis Institute of Music to study western music, was invited to perform on NBC as the first traditional Chinese musician to perform on television, and recorded the album Chinese Classical Music with Musicraft Records.

After returning to China in late February 1940, Wei became a professor of Chinese music at Hujiang University with the recommendation from Shen Zhibai. At this time, the Union Music Club was relocated to Chongqing due to the ongoing war, and Wei established "Zhongle Music Hall" on its original site. In 1941, Wei co-founded a Chinese orchestra group along with Jin Zuli, Xu Guangyi and others. He also performed for foreign radio stations in Shanghai, including British Democracy Radio and the Voice of the Soviet Union Radio.

In 1949, Wei became a professor at the Shanghai Conservatory of Music. In 1954, he joined a Chinese delegation to South and Southeast Asia, with which he visited and performed in India, Myanmar and Indonesia. In 1956, Wei became the deputy director and later the director of the Folk Music Department of Shanghai Conservatory of Music. In 1962, he served as the vice chairman of the Shanghai Branch of the Chinese Musicians' Association.

During the Cultural Revolution, Wei Zhongle was accused of and detained for being a "reactionary academic authority", partially for his complaints during the Great Chinese Famine. His disciple Tu Weigang bribed the guards to ensure that Wei could maintain a normal lifestyle.

Wei died of myocardial infarction in Huadong Hospital of Shanghai on 7 April 1997.

== See also ==
- Performances of Wei Zhongle on Internet Archive
