= Gong Yi =

Chinese musician

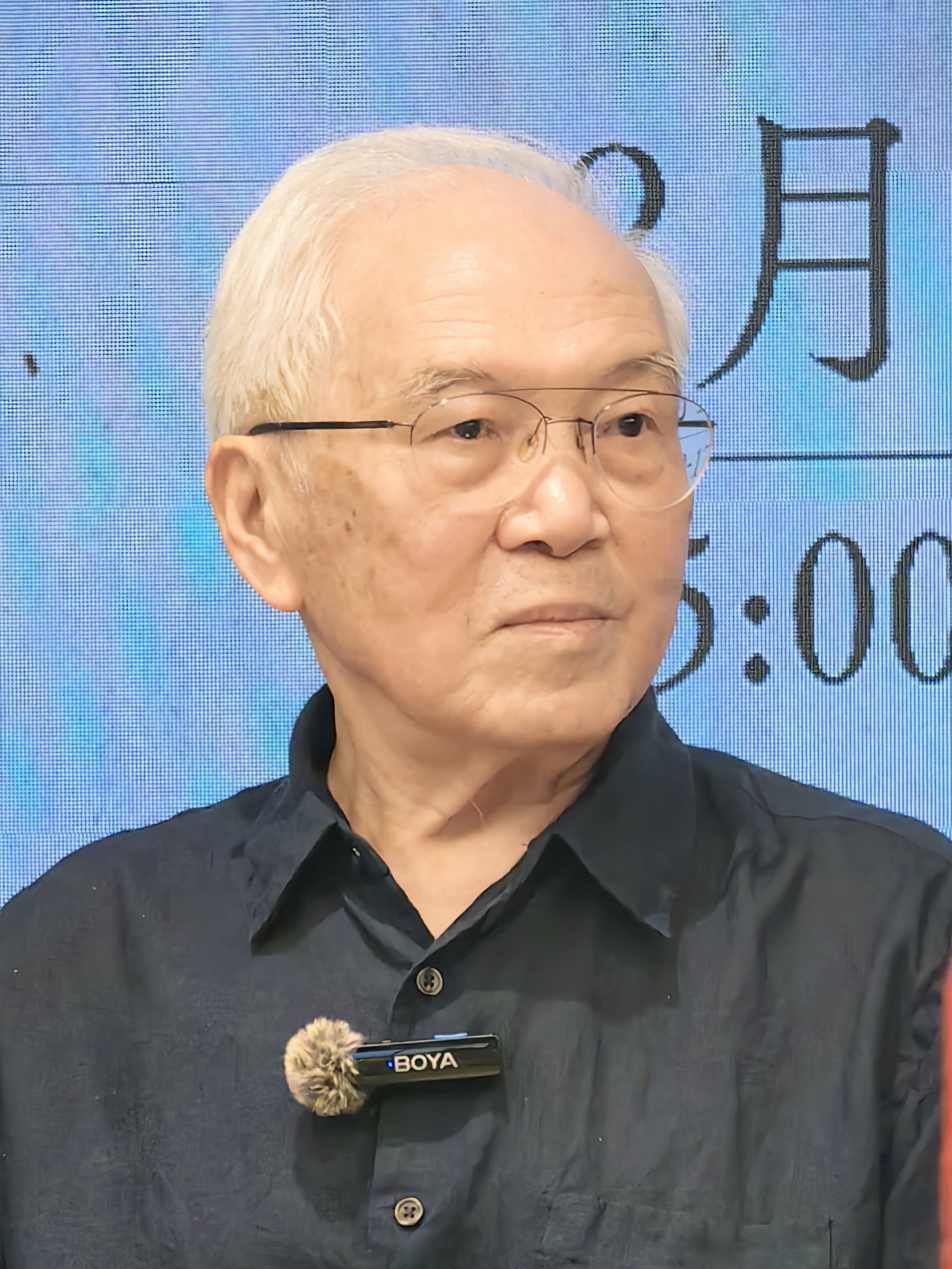
- Gong in 2025
- Traditional Chinese: 龔一
- Simplified Chinese: 龚一
Transcriptions
Standard Mandarin
- Hanyu Pinyin: Gong Yi

Gong Yi (龔一, b. 1941) is a guqin master from Shanghai, presently one of the instrument's leading figures. Born in Nanjing, he trained first under several local players (including Liu Shaochun and Xia Yifeng) before proceeding to the Shanghai Conservatory where he absorbed a range of styles from such prominent masters as Zhang Ziqian, Xu Lisun, Gu Meigeng, and Wei Zhongle. Gong Yi has had, since the 1950s, a varied career performing, teaching, composing, and researching under the auspices of several institutions and ensembles, most notably the Shanghai Chinese Orchestra of which he was director and sole guqin player. In guqin circles he is particularly noted for his efforts toward integration of the instrument into the conservatory mainstream.
