= Asian Music Circuit =

UK-based organisation

- Also known as: AMC
- Origin: London, England, United Kingdom
- Genres: music of Asia
- Occupation: music promoter
- Years active: 1989-present
- Website: http://www.amc.org.uk

The Asian Music Circuit (AMC) is a UK-based organisation based which produces tours and concerts internationally, holds educational and outreach events in the UK and works generally to promote the music of Asia. Registered in Hemel Hempstead, its office and museum are based in West London. A registered charity funded by Arts Council England, the organisation celebrates twenty years since its incorporation in 2011, though it was initially founded in 1989. It is regarded as a leading promoter of pan-Asian music in England.

== Concerts and touring ==
Touring is the main activity of the AMC. Most prominent Asian performers have worked with the Asian Music Circuit, including Pandit Ravi Shankar, Anuradha Paudwal, The Kamkars, Fun-da-mental, the Naxi musicians of China and Asha Bhosle. The AMC has produced concerts in London's Royal Albert Hall as part of the BBC Proms, Royal Festival Hall and Wembley Arena, and also in the Sage Gateshead and at Manchester International Festival. It occasionally brings tours to Europe, the US and Asia.

The AMC brought Bollywood stars Shankar–Ehsaan–Loy to the Royal Albert Hall in September 2011 - the group's first-ever performance in the UK.

== Education and outreach projects ==
Every year, the AMC hosts a variety of workshops and courses for singers and instrumentalists, including khyal, tabla, dhrupad and ghazal. In partnership with the UK IMRs, the AMC sends artists to lead performance days with detainees. Working with local schools in West London, the AMC invites teachers to bring classes into its museum, or sends teachers to classrooms directly. Its foci have included the music of Afghanistan and poetry events.

Since 2010, the summer schools have been scaled down due to funding cuts.

== Museum of Asian Music ==
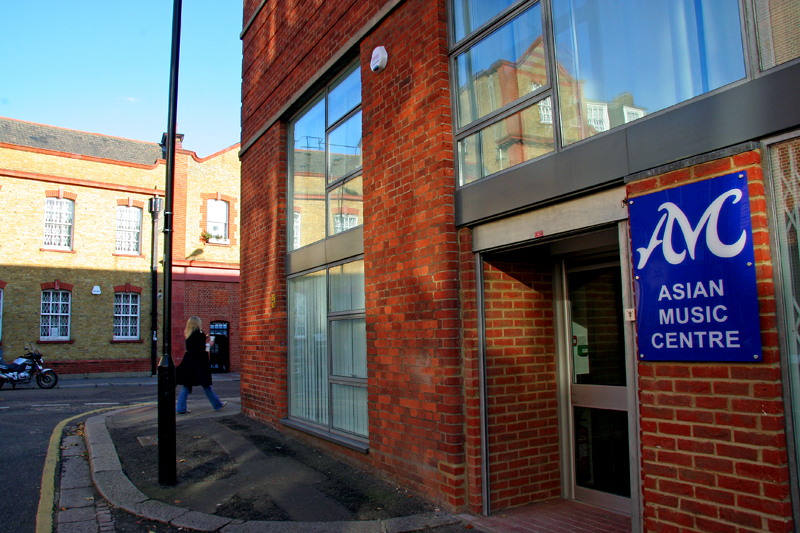
The AMC's London office and Museum of Asian Music

The AMC is based in its Museum in Acton was officially opened by The Prince of Wales in 2008. It features permanent displays of Asian musical instruments and temporary exhibitions focusing on different countries and regions of Asia. An extensive audio-visual archive is based here and can be accessed on dedicated computer terminals.

== See also ==
- Arts Council England
