= Wu Zhaoji =

Chinese musician and tai chi practitioner (1908-1997)

- Traditional Chinese: 吳兆基
- Simplified Chinese: 吴兆基
Transcriptions
Standard Mandarin
- Hanyu Pinyin: Wu Zhaoji

Wu Zhaoji (吳兆基, 1908-1997), also known as Xiangquan, was a Chinese musician. Born in Hunan, China in 1908, he moved to Suzhou at the age of four with his family, where he lived for the rest of his life until his death in 1997. Raised in a musical family, he learned the guqin from his father, and in 1921 became a student of Wu Jinyang. From a young age, he enjoyed sports and martial arts. In 1928 he began studying the Yang-style tai chi with Chen Weiming. One year later, he became a student of Li Shangyuan, who is a student of Wu (Hao)-style tai chi. After many years of study he created his own style of tai chi based on Daoism.

Wu Zhaoji is popularly revered as an archetypal "literatus" qin player; his smooth, detached, intellectual, yet vigorous style made him one of the most highly regarded amateur players in the late 20th century. Though a well-known Guqin master, Wu was, by profession, a mathematics professor at Soochow University in Suzhou, Jiangsu Province. The "Wu" school of qin playing currently centered in Suzhou takes him as a leading figure; noted players to transmit his style include Wang Duo and Yuan Jung-ping.

== See also ==
Please see: References section in the guqin article for a full list of references used in all qin related articles.
