= Guan Pinghu =

Chinese musician

- Chinese: 管平湖
Transcriptions
Standard Mandarin
- Hanyu Pinyin: Guǎn Pínghú

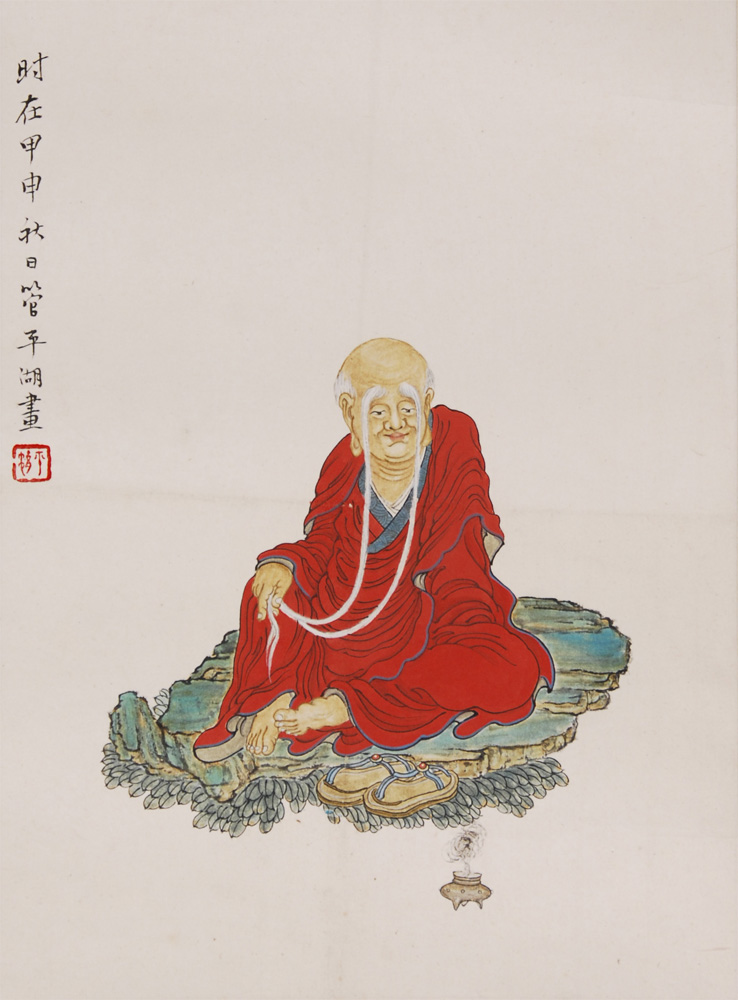
Painting by Guan Pinghu, 1944

Guan Pinghu (4 March 1897 – 28 March 1967), was a leading player of the guqin (古琴) and one of the most influential Guqin artists in the 20th Century. Born in Suzhou, Jiangsu, Guan came from an artistic family, and started to learn the guqin from his father, Guan Nianci. After the death of his father when he was thirteen, Guan continued with his father's friend Ye Shimeng and Zhang Xiangtao. He also studied with the leading players of three different schools; Yang Zongji (1865–1933), the leading player in Beijing, the Daoist Qin Heming, and the Buddhist monk Wucheng.

Before 1949, Guan did some teaching at the Yenching University, but had most of his meager income from selling paintings and repairing old musical instruments and furniture.

In 1952, he became a teacher and assistant researcher at the Zhongyang Yinyue Xueyuan (Central Conservatory of Music) and a leading force at the Beijing Guqin Yanjiuhui (Beijing Guqin Research Institute), both in Beijing. He also recreated and performed many pieces, including Guangling San (《廣陵散》), Youlan (《碣石調幽蘭》- Secluded Orchid), and Hujia Shiba Pai (《胡笳十八拍》 – Eighteen Songs of a Nomad Flute), that only existed as notation through a process known as dapu (打譜). These pieces have become part of the core repertory of guqin music. Though he trained few prominent students, Guan's numerous recordings – notable for their austerity, subtlety, and bold presentation – have exerted wide and continuing influence.

In 1977, a recording of "Liu Shui" (流水; Stream), as performed by Guan, was chosen to be included in the Voyager Golden Record, a gold-plated LP recording containing music from around the world, which was sent into outer space by NASA on the Voyager 1 and Voyager 2 spacecraft. It is the second-longest excerpt included on the disc (lasting seven minutes and 37 seconds) and the only excerpt of Chinese music.

== See also ==
Please see: References section in the guqin article for a full list of references used in all qin related articles.
