= Zeng Chengwei =

Chinese musician of the guqin

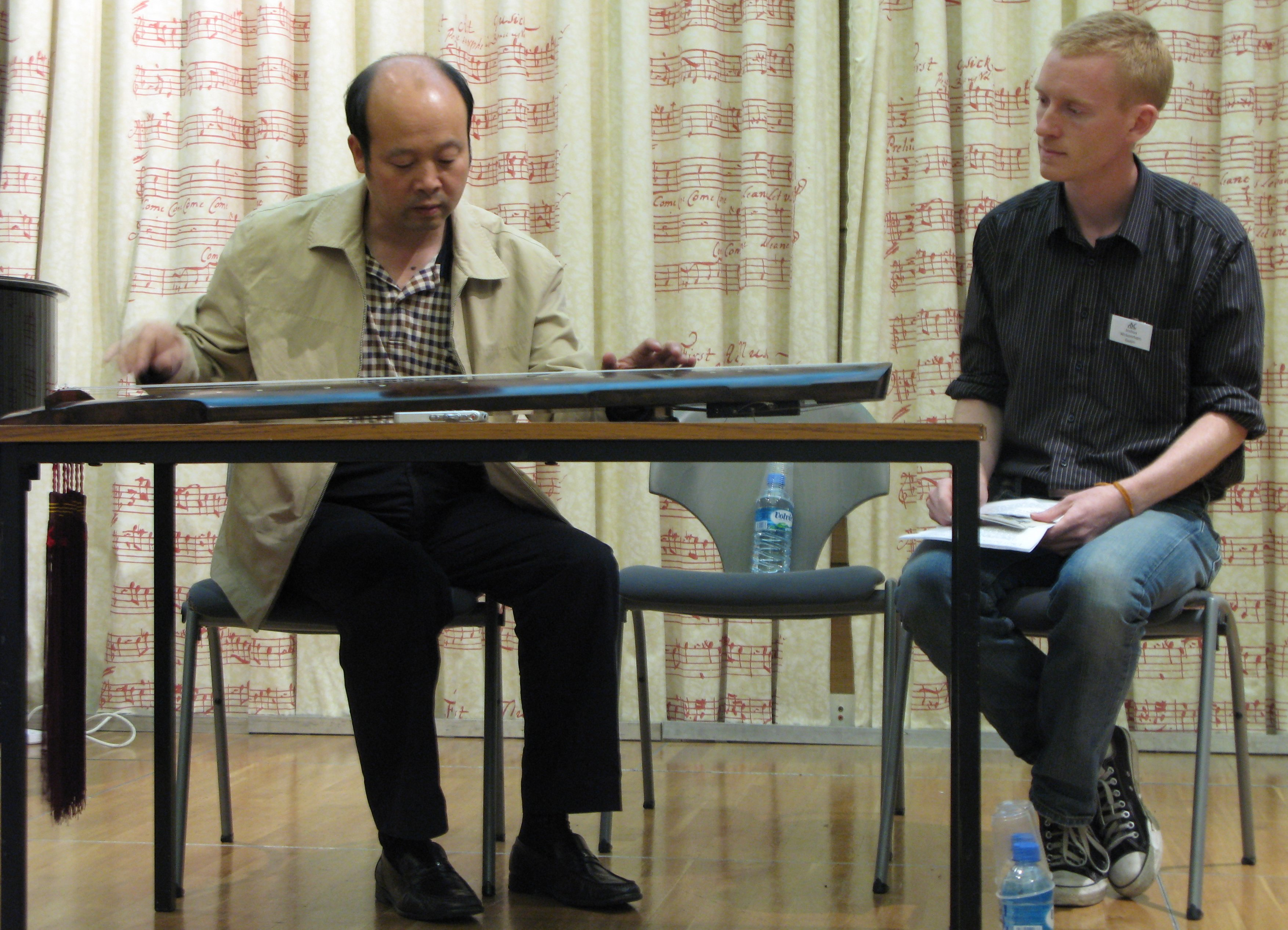
- Zeng (left) playing qin in 2007 at a concert given at Royal Academy of Music in London during the Chinese Music Summer School.
- Traditional Chinese: 曾成偉
- Simplified Chinese: 曾成伟
Transcriptions
Standard Mandarin
- Hanyu Pinyin: Zéng Chéngwěi

Zeng Chengwei (曾成偉) (b. 1958) is a Chinese musician of the guqin, born in the Sichuan province of China. He is a fifth-generation transmitter (counting from Zhang Kongshan) of the Shu school (蜀派; sometimes called the Chuan School (川派)) of qin music, having studied with his maternal grandfather, Yu Shaoze. Zeng is also a well-known maker of the instrument.

He is currently the president of the Jinjiang Qin Society, assistant professor of folk music at the Sichuan Conservatory of Music and executive director of the Chinese Guqin Association.

== Biography ==
Born in Chengdu on 18 April 1958, he started learning qin from his maternal grandfather, Yu Shaoze, from 1972 at the recommendation of his mother. However, his father insisted he study mechanics and so he went into the paper manufacturing industry. During this time, he persevered with his qin studies and eventually in 1982 he was admitted into the Sichuan Conservatory of Music research department to specifically study the qin. In 1995 he was appointed as the qin lecturer and began to perform and teach professionally.

== Style and lineage ==
Zeng's style is fluid and yet restrained, focusing on simplicity and roundness. His melodies are often meditative and removed. Very little ornamentation is used or used sparingly to add to the flavour of the pieces he plays. On the other hand, his rendition of Liu Shui is very vigorous and intensive, unlike modern renditions as he imitates the sound of full bodied water churning.

Zeng's lineage can be traced directly to the founder of the modern Shu School, Zhang Kongshan (張孔山) of the 19th century, through the Ye Jiefu (葉介福) branch. His son, Zeng He (曾河), is regarded as his successor of the lineage. He has also taught many students, some from outside China, in particular through the London Youlan Qin Society in the United Kingdom for five years at their annual summer school program.

== Qin making ==
Zeng has many years of experience as a qin maker. The instruments he makes are notable for their ease of playing and consistency. The strings are close to the surface yet there is no buzzing (this is caused mostly by strings vibrating against the surface). The slope towards the bridge is steeper than general qins and the instrument is loud. The tone is sweeter and more rounded.

His qins are mostly made in the standard zhongni (Confucian) shape and are very plain in appearance and finish. The main focus on his qins are playability and sound above appearance in order to meet the needs of modern qin performance.

His patronage is Prof. Li Xiangting, who praised his qin making skills, comparing them to the Tang dynasty maker, Lei Wei. He is quoted in Zeng's CD (translated by Yip Mingmei): "[His qins] are of top quality, with antique form based on a high standard."

== Recordings ==
Zeng has one recording on an album published by HUGO; Shu (Sichuan) Qin Music (Vol.3). It contains most of his repertoire and includes pieces transmitted to him as well as his own transcriptions. In the sleeve notes, Yip Mingmei describes his playing as "smooth but not decorated, energetic but not forced, his touch is firm and the tone color emitted is full and bright. His harmonious and balanced playing inclines toward the Confucian ideal of the middle way. [...] His fingerings are clean and pure, and his rhythm clear and precise."

Another album recording released in 1996 is Gold Finger: Chinese Guqin (金手指——孔子讀易) and features a guqin and erhu duet and is widely available in a downloadable format rather than a physical CD.
