= Wu Jinglüe =

Guqin player

Wu Jinglue 吳景略
- Born: February 5, 1907; Changshu, Jiangsu Province, Qing
- Died: August 16, 1987 (aged 87) Beijing, PRC
- Genres: Traditional Chinese music
- Occupation: Guqin player
- Instrument: Guqin

Wu Jinglüe
- Chinese: 吳景略
Transcriptions
Standard Mandarin
- Hanyu Pinyin: Wú Jǐnglüè

Wu Jinglüe (吳景略) (February 5, 1907 – August 16, 1987) is considered one of the most important guqin players of the 20th century and was also an active researcher and teacher. He was born in the town of Xitang, Changshu County, near Suzhou in Jiangsu, China, and died in Beijing.

Wu served as a professor at the Central Conservatory of Music in Beijing, and played a prominent role in raising the guqin to professional standards as a concert instrument. His boldly passionate but also lyrically refined style was widely syncretic and incorporated influences from various qin schools as well as folk and Western music. The two most distinguished players to transmit his style and repertoire are Li Xiangting and Wu Wenguang (吳文光, Wu Jinglüe's son), currently the leading guqin figures in Beijing's conservatories; Wu's broader influence extends much more widely.

Wu styled himself an inheritor of the Yushan school of qin play influential during the Ming dynasty, but this association draws from his place of birth and his artistic aspirations rather than any unbroken lineage or firm stylistic affinity. His contemporary tradition is sometimes called Wu school, Yushan school, or Yushan Wu school.
