= Zha Fuxi =

- 査阜西
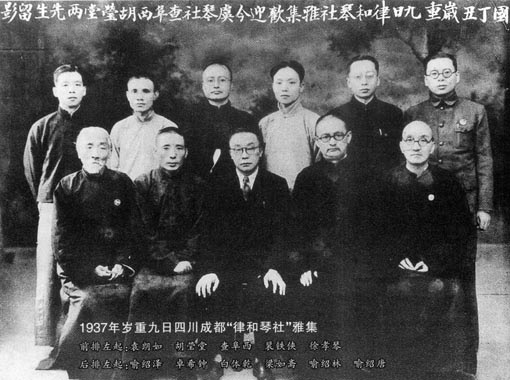
- Zha Fuxi (middle front) in a yaji of Lvhe Qin Society
- Born: 1895; Xiushui, Jiangxi, Qing
- Died: 1976; Beijing, PRC
- Occupation(s): Guqin player, vice president of Central Air Transport Co.
- Musical career
- Genres: Traditional Chinese music
- Instrument: Guqin

Zha Fuxi (Chinese: 查阜西; 1895–1976), also known as Zha Yiping (查夷平) was a leading player and scholar of the guqin. Born in Jiangxi, he started learning guqin in his childhood. In 1936, he co-founded the Jinyu Qin Society (今虞琴社) which later became one of the major national musical organizations for the guqin.

Apart from his profession on guqin, he worked for the civil aviation company and was active in the labour movement. After the People's Republic of China was established in 1949, he was a vice-chairman of the National Musical Association, president of the Beijing Guqin Society, and a department head at the Central Institute of (Folk) Music.

Few recordings of his qin performance have been published, though more remain in private and institutional circulation. His playing style was unaffected but serious and elegant; he specialized in qin songs (accompanying himself vocally) and contributed several noteworthy dapu reconstructions, as well as earning the nickname "Zha Xiaoxiang" for his mastery of the piece Xiao Xiang Shui Yun.

== See also ==
Please see: References section in the guqin article for a full list of references used in all qin related articles.
