= Wang Zigan =

Chinese papercutting artist

- Born: April 18, 1920
- Died: February 16, 2000 (aged 79)
- Known for: Papercutting

Wang Zigan (Chinese: 王子淦) (April 18, 1920 - February 16, 2000) was a modern papercutting artist, master of arts and crafts, and famous Shanghai-style papercutter. His most important representative works are "The crowing of the cock" (Chinese: 一唱雄鸡天下白), "Chicken eats centipede" (Chinese: 鸡吃蜈蚣), etc. Some of his published works include "Selected papercutting works of Wang Zigan" (Chinese: 王子淦剪纸选), "History of Shanghai papercutting" (Chinese: 上海剪纸今夕) and "The creation of papercutting" (Chinese: 剪纸艺术的创新).

== Early life ==
Wang was born to a poor peasant family in Jinsha Town (Chinese: 金沙镇), Nantong, Jiangsu Province. At the age of 13, he relocated to Shanghai with his uncle, where he embarked on a journey to master the art of papercutting under the guidance of a street artist named Wu Wanheng (Chinese: 武万恒). Wang exhibited a remarkable aptitude for this craft and promptly established a street-side stand to vend his papercut creations in various areas of Shanghai, including the vicinity of the New Town God's Temple (Chinese: 新城隍庙) and Baixianqiao (Chinese: 八仙桥) in the downtown district.

Over the course of his career, Wang Zigan crafted a substantial number of papercut artworks and embroidery patterns, which were subsequently distributed across both urban and rural regions. Despite his prolific output, his family, comprising six members, endured persistent hardship marked by hunger and poverty. Wang's life as a papercut artist was characterized by economic challenges, and his artistic contributions remained largely devoid of official recognition. Nevertheless, he held a strong aspiration that this folk art form would endure and serve as a means of sustaining his legacy.

With the support of the Communist Party and the government following the year 1949, Wang embarked on a new chapter in his career by joining the Shanghai Arts and Crafts Studio (Chinese: 工艺美术研究室), which is presently known as the Shanghai Arts and Crafts Institution (上海工艺美术研究所). This transition allowed Wang to witness the stark contrast between his former way of life and the transformative developments of the contemporary era. He developed a profound affection for his craft and an appreciation for the profound changes taking place in China, recognizing the significance of his artistic work within this evolving landscape.

=== Childhood ===
Wang Zigan belonged to a generation marked by considerable hardships. His early life circumstances were such that his parents opted to send him away for adoption shortly after his birth. He was entrusted to his childless uncle, who, like Wang's biological parents, grappled with economic challenges. In an effort to improve their financial situation and provide for Wang's upbringing, his uncle decided to acquire the skill of haircutting. After mastering this trade, he borrowed funds and established a barber shop, hoping for a better future.

When Wang Zigan reached the age of six, his uncle's proficiency in haircutting led to an invitation from the Jinsha State School (金沙镇国立小学). This invitation, extended on the basis of recommendations, entailed providing haircuts to the school's teachers and students. In return for his uncle's services, Wang Zigan gained admission to the school. This educational opportunity represented the sole formal education Wang Zigan received in his lifetime. Its significance lay in the profound impact it had on his subsequent life journey. This foundational education equipped him with essential literacy skills, which would prove invaluable in his pursuit of various other self-taught disciplines and ultimately in his artistic career.

In 1932, Wang Zigan, then a child of under 13 years of age, migrated to Shanghai in the company of his uncle. After a brief period, Wang secured employment in a watchmaker's establishment to perform various tasks. However, he ultimately departed from this position due to mistreatment.

Subsequently, Wang's uncle made efforts to find alternative employment opportunities for him. During this period, a papercutting stall, owned by an individual named Wu Wanheng, emerged as a viable option. Wu Wanheng, a prominent figure within the papercutting community at the age of 26, was actively seeking an apprentice. Wang Zigan was fortunate enough to be selected as the apprentice in question. This marked the auspicious commencement of his extensive 60-year career as a papercutting artist.

=== Apprentice life ===
Wu Wanheng specialized primarily in the creation of papercuts featuring folk embroidery patterns. In the context of their apprenticeship arrangement, Wang Zigan assumed a multifaceted role. He was responsible for domestic duties, which included early morning tasks such as lighting the stove, preparing breakfast, and washing vegetables and rice for lunch. Subsequently, he would assist his master at the papercutting stand. As evening approached, Wang Zigan would again undertake household chores, often extending into late hours.

It was customary during that era for masters not to dedicate extensive time to instructing their apprentices, yet Wang Zigan exhibited a capacity for rapid learning. He utilized his available time to acquire the requisite papercutting skills.

The method employed to acquire these skills primarily involved the replication of papercut samples crafted by Wang Zigan's master. Remarkably, Wang Zigan diligently fulfilled his domestic responsibilities without delay, a practice that pleased his master and allowed him the freedom to pursue his training.

During this period, Wang Zigan developed his skills through a process of presenting his papercut works to his master for feedback. In this way, he developed a proficiency and knowledge in papercutting techniques.

In Shanghai, there existed a community of approximately 100 papercut artists, among whom individuals like Wu Wanheng were prominent. Many of these artists resided in close proximity to Baxianqiao. In circumstances where inclement weather rendered it impractical to set up stands outdoors, they would convene at a local tea house to engage in papercutting endeavors.

Wang Zigan frequently accompanied his master to these gatherings, where he had the opportunity to observe the work and techniques of various artisans. These occasions served as valuable platforms for Wang Zigan to expand his artistic horizons and acquire new skills from his peers. Wang Zigan's exceptional memory enabled him to retain and incorporate the novel patterns and superior techniques he encountered during these interactions.

Wang Zigan successfully concluded his apprenticeship three years following its initiation. During this period, his master had expanded his enterprise and established a shop specializing in the sale of papercut patterns known as "Heng Chang Xiang" (Chinese: 恒昌祥), situated at No. 147 Jinling Road (Chinese: 金陵中路147号) in Shanghai.

Customarily, apprentices would part ways with their masters upon completing their apprenticeship. However, in Wang Zigan's case, his master harbored reservations about releasing him for two primary reasons. Firstly, the business was experiencing growth, and there was a need for additional manpower. Secondly, Wang Zigan demonstrated continuous improvement in his papercutting skills. Moreover, his proactiveness in creating new patterns tailored to market demands garnered the favor of customers, significantly enhancing the success of "Heng Chang Xiang" and distinguishing it from other establishments in the industry.

As a result, Wang Zigan's master made considerable efforts to retain him. Wang Zigan, for his part, found himself in a predicament, as he was without familial support in Shanghai, with his uncle and aunt having relocated to Congmin Island. Furthermore, he lacked the financial means to establish his own business. Given these circumstances, Wang Zigan acquiesced to his master's insistence and chose to remain in his service. This arrangement persisted for a decade, during which Wang Zigan resided with his master, sharing meals and accommodations. The income he generated, though modest, provided a means to stave off cold and hunger, making it a practical decision to stay.

In reality, Wang Zigan's papercutting prowess evolved into a primary economic driver for "Hong Chang Xiang." As a consequence, he became well known as one of the preeminent folk artists in the papercutting tradition within Shanghai.

=== Marriage ===
Around 1943, Wang Zigan married Pan Miaoxin (Chinese: 潘妙新). Pan Miaoxin, being the sole daughter in her family, found herself in the circumstance of leasing the backroom of "Heng Chang Xiang." Her family had relocated from Changshu, Jiangsu Province to Shanghai due to the upheavals caused by the Anti-Japanese War. Pan Miaoxin, a person of good lineage, possessed a composed disposition and striking beauty. She had received a well-rounded education under her parents' guidance, which spanned several years.

In line with the prevailing trends of the era in Shanghai, Pan Miaoxin held a deep passion for embroidery. Thus, when she first encountered the exquisite papercut creations crafted by Wang Zigan—something entirely novel to her—she became captivated by his artistry. Enthralled by Wang Zigan's techniques, she became a frequent visitor to the papercut shop, observing his work diligently and occasionally assisting him during busy periods. Over time, a romantic connection blossomed between the two young individuals. However, Pan Miaoxin's mother vehemently opposed their union. She held the desire for her daughter to marry a wealthy man, envisioning a life of leisure for herself supported by her daughter's marriage—a sentiment not uncommon during that era. Despite this opposition, Wang Zigan and Pan Miaoxin got married secretly, without her mother's consent.

Following the resolution of their marital challenges, Wang Zigan contemplated embarking on an independent business endeavor. The income he derived from his master's establishment proved inadequate to support not only himself but also his wife and the future children they anticipated.

Initially met with resistance from his master, Wang Zigan eventually secured approval for his business aspirations. This agreement, however, came with specific economic terms concerning compensation for his master. By 1945, with the conclusion of the Anti-Japanese War, Wang Zigan had achieved personal liberation and gained autonomy from his master's oversight.

In pursuit of his entrepreneurial aspirations, Wang Zigan leased a vendor stand adjacent to the New Town God's Temple, now situated near the intersection of Lianyun Road and Jinling Road. Here, he marketed his own papercut creations. His prior customers from "Heng Chang Xiang" began to patronize him due to his sterling reputation and adept interpersonal skills, enabling Wang Zigan to enjoy a comfortable life with his family.

However, in the aftermath of the Anti-Japanese War, the market experienced a downturn owing to the outbreak of the civil war. Consequently, Wang Zigan confronted the necessity of arduous work to generate modest profits. To supplement their income, his wife engaged in embroidery work for other households, lending vital support to their family's economic stability.

=== People's Republic of China ===
Following the establishment of the People's Republic of China, there was a prevailing atmosphere of optimism and a heightened focus on the development of folk arts. Consequently, the art of papercutting by Wang Zigan garnered the attention of relevant cultural authorities. In 1953, the Bureau of Culture of the Shanghai Municipal Government recommended the inclusion of select works by Wang Zigan in the East China Arts and Crafts Exhibition (Chinese: 华东地区工艺美术作品观摩会).

Subsequently, the government embarked on a concerted effort to identify artists with exceptional talents and sought to organize them effectively. This initiative led to the establishment of the Shanghai Arts and Crafts Studio (Chinese: 工艺美术研究室), now known as the Shanghai Arts and Crafts Institution (Chinese: 上海工艺美术研究所), in 1956. This institution engaged twelve accomplished artists from various backgrounds, each possessing extensive artistic careers and a high level of professional expertise, to undertake specialized research projects. Notably, Wang Zigan, then 37 years old, was the youngest member among them.

The commencement of a new phase in Wang Zigan's life infused fresh inspiration into his artistic endeavors. What were once mere commodities transformed into pieces of art under his skillful hands. Wang Zigan dedicated himself to the preservation and reinterpretation of the historical tradition of papercutting, particularly the aspects that endured in Southern China. Concurrently, his mastery of the craft continued to progress significantly.

In 1957, Wang Zigan attained the distinction of being elected as a representative at the First National Senior Artists Congress (Chinese: 首届全国老艺人代表大会) held in Beijing. During this congress, notable state leaders such as Zhu De(Chinese: 朱德) delivered speeches and took the opportunity to engage with representatives from across the nation.

In 1960, the inaugural collection of Wang Zigan's papercuts was published by the Light Industry Publishing House (Chinese: 轻工业出版社). This period also witnessed the establishment of a professional titles system within the arts and crafts community. Recognizing his outstanding contributions, Wang Zigan was conferred the title of Arts and Crafts Master (Chinese: 工艺师).

=== Cultural Revolution ===
During the Cultural Revolution, Wang Zigan became a target of the revolution. Large-character posters known as Dazibao(Chinese: 大字报) and mass criticism and repudiation campaigns labeled senior artists within his work unit as "bourgeois academic authorities." As part of the broader effort to eradicate the "four Olds" (Chinese: 破四旧), all traditional artistic works were stigmatized as "feudalistic, bourgeois, and revisionist" (Chinese: 封资修).

The Arts and Crafts Studio, like similar institutions nationwide, became embroiled in the tumultuous upheaval of the revolution. In the chaotic winter of 1966, Wang Zigan, in a bid to establish revolutionary connections, relocated to Nanjing with his second son. There, he undertook menial tasks in a canteen and worked as a pedicab driver.

However, Wang Zigan remained unsatisfied with his work, perceiving a deficiency in the grandeur of his creations, which he deemed too simplistic in style and lacking in ornate decoration and intricate lines. To address this, he delved into materials and imagery from the Han and Tang Dynasties, studied Northern Chinese papercutting traditions, and drew inspiration from diverse artistic realms, including Peking operas, woodcut paintings (Chinese: 版画), Chinese brush paintings, and Chinese calligraphy. Additionally, he sought guidance from seasoned artists. As a result of these efforts, Wang Zigan's papercuts underwent a significant stylistic transformation.

== Later life and achievements ==
On 1 July 1983, the leaders of Shanghai Arts and Crafts Institution (previously known as Shanghai Arts and Crafts Studio) held a commemorate exhibition of Wang Zigan's 50-year papercutting career at Shanghai Fine Arts Museum (Chinese: 上海美术展览馆). Many celebrities of the art circle came to the show and jointly applauded his works.

Wang Zigan had been to Japan twice in the 1980s and once to Hong Kong to give lectures. In the meantime, he published a series of papercut collections. On the opening ceremony of the First Shanghai International Art Festival (Chinese: 第一届 上海国际电视艺术节), Wang Zigan appeared on a TV program and gave a papercut performance face to face with foreign and Chinese guests. Jiang Zemin (Chinese: 江泽民), then Shanghai mayor, sat beside him after the performance and chatted with him for half an hour about the past and present of papercutting. He praised his excellent skills and even mentioned the papercut artists in his hometown Yangzhou.

In September 1990 when the 11th Asiad was held in Beijing, Wang Zigan was a member of the Shanghai Delegation in the Shopping Centre of Beijing Asiad, and Zhu Rongji (Chinese: 朱镕基), then Shanghai mayor, came to see the Shanghai Delegation. When he saw the performance Wang Zigan had given, Zhu Rongji exclaimed: Wonderful cut (Chinese: 神剪)!

In 1957, his papercuts "Plum blossoms, orchids, bamboo, and chrysanthemum" (Chinese: 梅兰竹菊) and "Beijing Tian'anmen and Indonesia Treasure Palace"(Chinese: 北京天安门和印尼藏物宫) were given to foreign leaders as national gifts.

Wang Zigan had won the title of a Shanghai Model worker (Chinese: 劳动模范) for three consecutive years, was elected a member of Shanghai Municipal CPPCC (Chinese: 上海市政协), a member of the China Folk Literary and Arts Association (Chinese: 中国文学艺术家联合会民间研究会), council of China Folk Literature and Arts Studies (Chinese: 中国民间文艺研究会) and council of Shanghai Folk Literature and Arts Studies (Chinese: 上海市民间文艺研究会), joined China Fine Artists Association (Chinese: 中国美术家协会), and was awarded the title of a senior master in arts and crafts (Chinese: 高级工艺美术师) in 1987. He was granted the title of a Super Master in Arts and Crafts (Chinese: 工艺美术特级大师) and the honor medal, and was engaged by the Shanghai Municipal Government to do research in the Research Institute of Culture and History.

In November 1993, Wang Zigan had a stroke due to infarction arteriosclerosis and was confined to bed for seven years. He died on 16 February 2000.

== Features and style of Wang's papercuts ==
He inherited the folk papercutting tradition of the south of Yangtze River, and added his own innovation to his work on the basis of the original one. He expanded the subjects of papercut to a wider range, breaking through the limitation of the traditional papercut, which mostly featured on embroidery patterns. Traditional patterns, ranging from flowers, birds, fish and insects to mountains, rivers and fruits, and to people and beasts, as well as to fashionable ones that city people love are all used in the subjects of his works. He also made full use of waste material, cutting animals and plants out of modern waste paper. Such waste paper is of hard quality and the texture patterns which are produced during the process of printing, finely used by him, greatly enriched the papercut. Pursuit of learning while not being restricted to the tradition and the spirit of innovation made his papercut stand out. Containing not only simple and profound cultural foundation, but also fresh and lively modern elements, his papercuts reached the true realm of art.

His papercut idea designed for the characters to be lively. The animals in his papercut have a kind of "spirituality": the naughty monkeys, the clever frogs, vigorous phoenix. His works combine the delicacy of the South-style papercut and the outgoing traits of the Northern-style papercut.

His papercutting has a strong rhythm and he was good at displaying the features of his papercut: symmetry, repetition and the interdependence of yin and yang. He was also good at displaying the animals' feathers and scales by repeatedly using his scissor and showing the actions and movements of animals by some spin patterns. This not only made cutting easier but also added more content to his works.

He had skilled papercutting skills, which contributed to his childhood experience of street performance. He used a large pair of scissors to perform in public, which are different from the papercutters from the South who carved patterns with knives. According to gjart, such performance provided people with great vision enjoyment.

== Development and transmission ==
=== Wang Jianzhong ===
Wang believes that he should not go public with his skills until he has mastered at least 90 per cent of his father's techniques. He also believes that artists should inject audacious innovation into their folk art. Being a scholar, Wang reads extensively. This has led him to sources of innovation. He has been developing the qiaose papercut technique (literally translated as clever cutting with coloured paper). For example, he used a photo depicting a red flower in a black vase to create a red rooster heralding the break of the day on a black hill. The idea is widely acclaimed by the young, who think it is really funny and requires both excellent skills and brilliant creativity.

His works of papercut won a Silver Award in Chinese Papercut Art Exhibition (Chinese: 华夏风韵剪纸艺术展), and a Gold Award in The First Chinese Folk Auspicious Art Exhibition in Nanjing.

In 2010 Wang's son brought Shanghai Zhending Chicken Development Industry Co to court for using his father's artwork on its registered trademark without approval. The local Chinese fast food restaurant was ordered to pay 80,000 yuan (US$12,640) to Wang's children for plagiarizing his rooster papercut design.

=== Zhao Ziping ===
Zhao Ziping (Chinese: 赵子平), a papercutter who lived in Zhabei district, Shanghai, was an apprentice to Wang Zigan. His works of papercutting are of wide subjects. The style of Zhao Ziping papercuts is distinctive with neat and exaggerate shapes. The lines of his papercuts are also natural and smooth. Zhao Ziping is good at creating two delicate, yin and yang works at the same time, which just use varieties of colours and grains of patterns. Meanwhile. He also tried to blaze a new trail of papercuts both in techniques and subjects. During productive time in his career, Zhao Ziping created tremendous papercuts with subjects of Chinese Ancient Fables, the Chinese horoscope and Dunhuang Murals etc.

== Sources ==
- Wang, Zigan (2004). The Art of Papercut. 上海人民美术出版社. ISBN 978-7-5322-3781-4.
- "神剪" 王子淦的故事,王建中,上海档案 2003. No. 3, Shanghai Archives
