= Pipa xing =

Poem by Bai Juyi

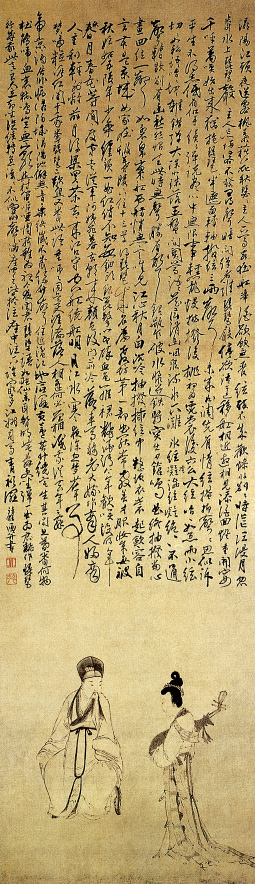
A Ming dynasty painting by Guo Xu (1456–1532), depicting Bai Juyi and the pipa player and the content of the poem Pipa xing, at the Beijing Palace Museum

"Pipa xing" (Chinese: 琵琶行), variously translated as "Song of the Pipa" or "Ballad of the Lute", is a Tang dynasty poem composed in 816 by the Chinese poet Bai Juyi, one of the greatest poets in Chinese history. The poem contains a description of a pipa performance during a chance encounter with a performer near the Yangtze River.

== Background and description ==
During the reign of Emperor Xianzong, Bai Juyi was exiled from court and appointed the sima in the distant town of Xun Yang. Traveling up the Yangtze River, he encountered a singer and pipa player who had also once lived in Chang'an. During her prime, she was a celebrated entertainer in the capital, and influential men and young nobles and scholars competed to shower her with gifts. However, she was forced to leave the capital when her beauty and fame faded and she end up marrying a traveling merchant (a tea trader), but he is often away on business, and leaves her all alone by herself. Joined by the bright autumn moon and the cold river water, she reminisces about her glorious past. However, the pipa player had lost none of her skill, and she plays for Bai Juyi. "Pipa xing" ("Pipa Song") describes their encounter and her performance.

The poem contains one of the most well-known lines in the history of Chinese poetry, as Bai Juyi listens to the pipa player playing the music and recounts her life, he wistfully reflects: "Both of us, fallen from grace, wandering at the edge of the world, need not be old acquaintances to meet by chance." (同是天涯淪落人，相逢何必曾相識。)

The poem has a total of 616 characters (including the 138-character preface would be 754 characters), and is known for the skilled artistry with which it describes sound. Ming dynasty calligrapher Chen Hongshou called the poem "very emotional and very expressive," adding that it made its hearers long for death in sympathy with its characters.

== Poem ==
The poem includes a preface, describing how Bai came to write the poem.

The poem includes a description of performance:

大絃嘈嘈如急雨
小絃切切如私語
嘈嘈切切錯雜彈
大珠小珠落玉盤

Thick strings clatter like splattering rain,
Fine strings murmur like whispered words,
Clattering and murmuring, meshing interweaving sounds,
Like pearls, big and small, falling on a platter of jade.

== Impact on Chinese culture ==
The poem has inspired a number of paintings on the meeting between the poet and the pipa player, an example is the painting by Guo Xu (pictured right). The quickly plucked notes of the pipa are compared to the sound of large and small pearls falling onto a jade plate. The Oriental Pearl Tower, the most famous sight of the city of Shanghai, bases its architecture, view and name on the poem. Eleven spheres of varying sizes are built into its structure, so that, viewed from the Bund, the building evokes the image of pearls, large and small, falling from heaven onto a jade plate represented by the surface of the Huangpu River, recalling the music of the pipa.
