= Oriental Pearl Tower =

TV tower in Shanghai, China

- 东方明珠广播电视塔
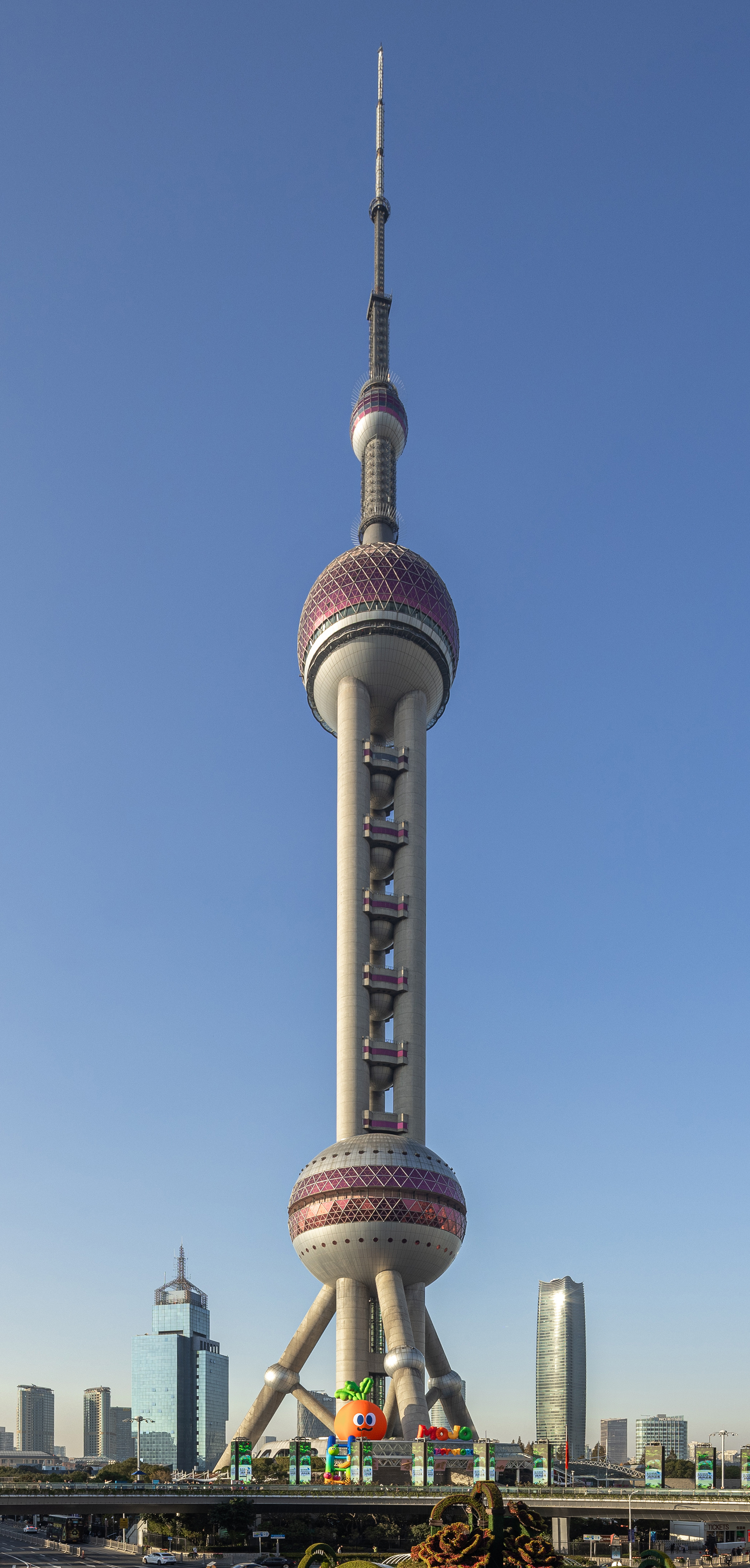
- Oriental Pearl Tower in 2025
- Interactive map of the Oriental Pearl Tower area

General information
- Status: Completed
- Type: Communication, hotel, observation, restaurant
- Location: Shanghai
- Coordinates: 31°14′30.01″N 121°29′40.98″E
- Construction started: July 30, 1991; 34 years ago
- Completed: November 18, 1994; 31 years ago
- Opened: May 1, 1995; 31 years ago

Height
- Antenna spire: 468 m (1,535 ft)
- Top floor: 351 m (1,152 ft)

Technical details
- Floor count: Equivalent of a 103 story building
- Lifts/elevators: 6

Design and construction
- Architect: Shanghai Modern Architectural Design Co. Ltd.
- Developer: Shanghai Oriental Group Co. Ltd.

The Oriental Pearl Tower (Note: simplified Chinese: 东方明珠电视塔; traditional Chinese: 東方明珠電視塔; pinyin: Dōngfāng Míngzhū diànshì tǎ; Shanghainese: Tonfån Mintsythah) is a futurist TV tower in Lujiazui, Shanghai. Built from 1991 to 1994, the tower was the tallest structure in China until the completion of nearby World Financial Center in 2007. Its status as Shanghai's first AAAAA tourist attraction, the tower's unique architecture, height, and fifteen observation decks have made it a cultural icon of the city.

== Architecture ==
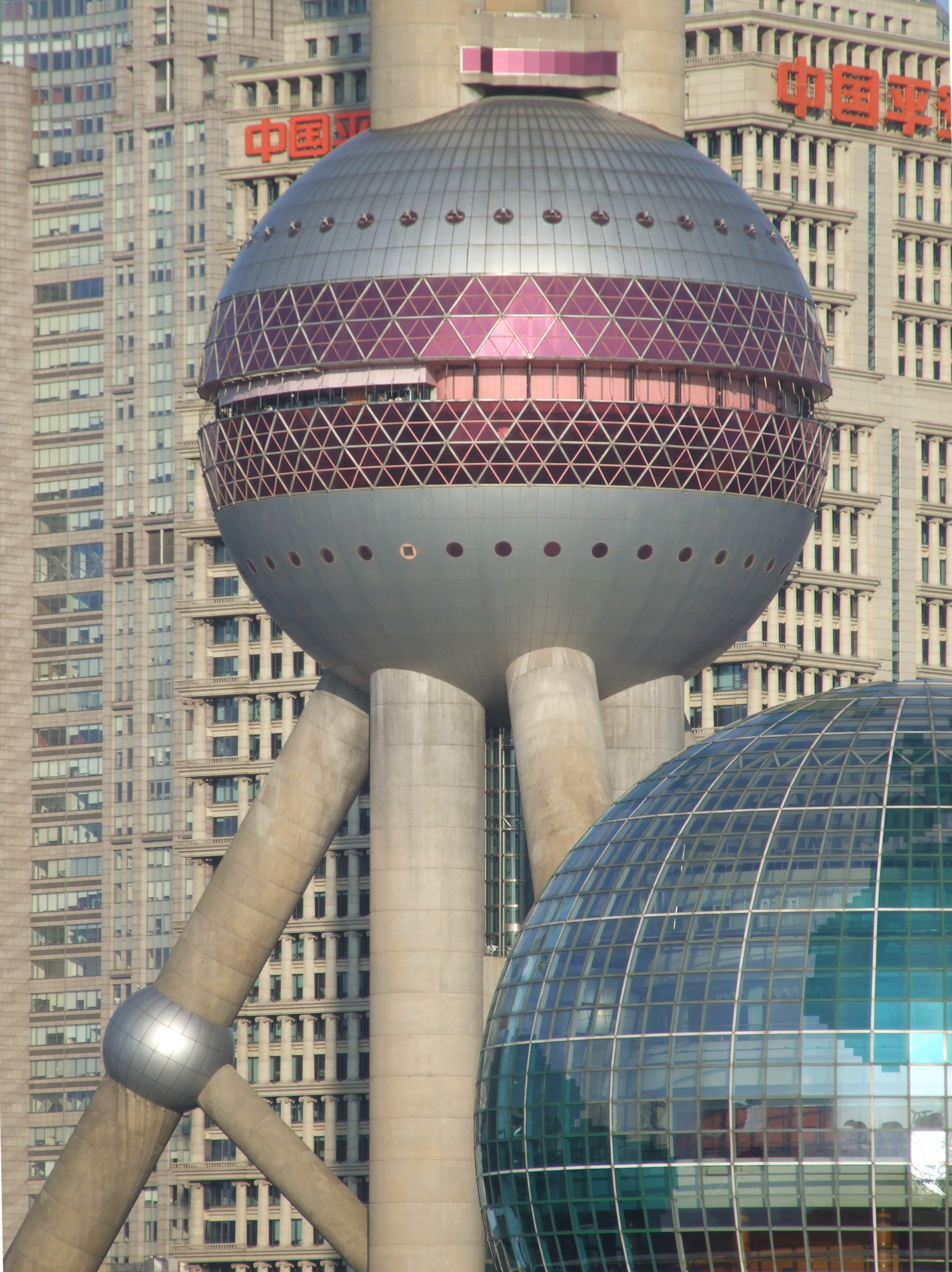
The bottom-most sphere and its foundations.

The top floor of the Oriental Pearl tower is at 351 metres (1,200 ft), which, combined with its 137 metres (450 ft) antenna, makes the tower 468 metres (1,500 ft) tall. The tower was the tallest freestanding structure in China and Asia from 1994 to 2007, but was later surpassed by Canton Tower in Guangzhou.

=== Foundation ===
Located in Lujiazui on the banks of the Huangpu River, the Oriental Pearl Tower stands directly opposite of the Bund. Due to the area's soft soil, large concrete pillars were planted deep within the ground. Steel pipes and plates provided additional support. This technology was later used in nearby Jin Mao Tower.

=== Spheres ===
Three large spherical platforms are connected by three pillars and an elevator in-between. According to its designers, the design, which reflects the culture of Shanghai, was inspired by "Pipa xing", a poem by Tang poet Bai Juyi. The spheres, which were constructed using an integral steel framework, are covered by concrete tiles and laminated red glass panes.

=== Observation levels ===
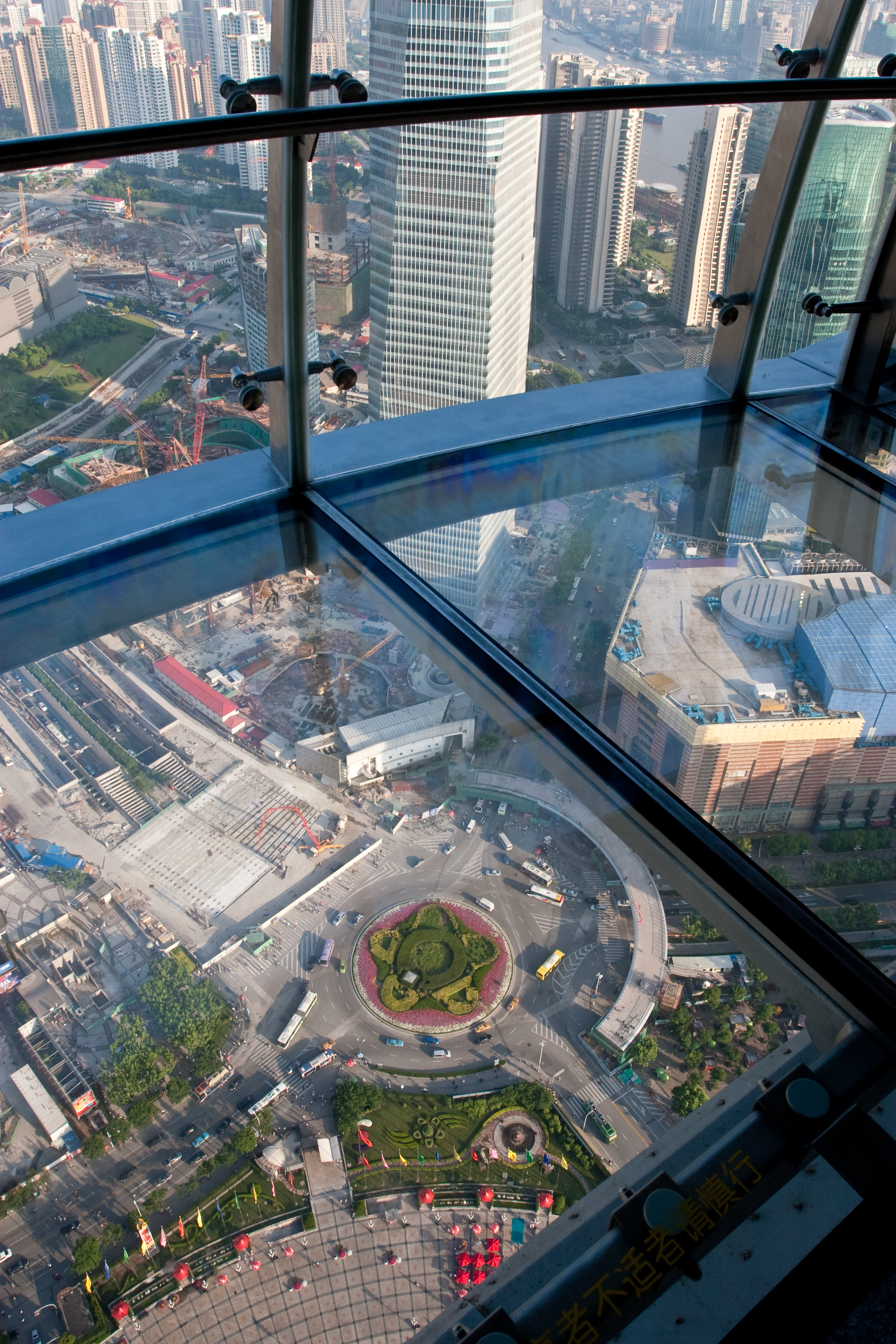
One of the glass floors.

The tower has fifteen observatory levels. Lower levels house amenities including a revolving restaurant, indoor roller coaster, and museums. Several levels, including the highest one, have panoramic glass floors. There is also a 20-room hotel, named the Space Hotel, between the two large spheres.

== History ==
=== Planning ===
An initial idea of building a new TV tower in downtown Shanghai in order to increase capacity and replace older infrastructure was introduced in a broadcast on August 25, 1983. On November 17 of the same year, the plan was refined and presented in Shanghai Media Group's sixth five-year plan. The tower was planned to be 400 metres (1,300 ft).

On March 25, 1984, the idea was formally proposed to the city congress, which chose a site in Lujiazui, an area rapidly developing due to the reform and opening up. The decision was made official by the Shanghai Radio and Television Bureau on August 23.

In October 1986, the final proposal, which included a raise in the tower's planned height to 468 metres (1,535 ft), was submitted to the National Planning Commission, which approved it in January of the following year.

In September 1988, a total of 12 designs from three firms were received. East China Architectural Design Institute's "Oriental Pearl" design was selected.

=== Construction and opening ===
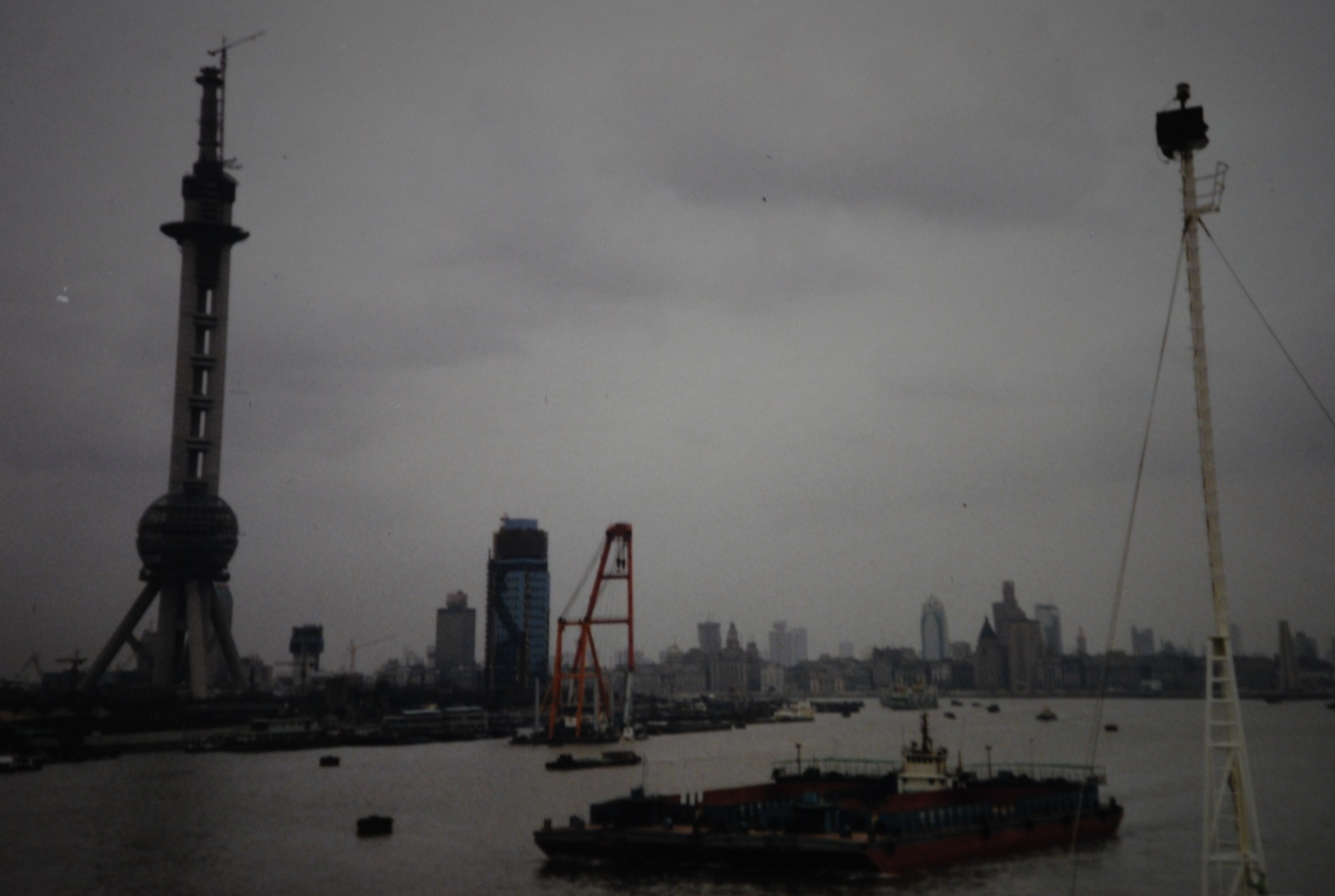
The tower under construction.

On July 30, 1991, the tower's foundation was laid and construction began. On December 14, 1993, the tower's body was cappied. On Labour Day of the following year, the antenna was installed after 11 days of ascension. On National Day, interior facilities were completed and began operating, marking the end of construction.

The Oriental Pearl Tower opened to the public a year later, and its first broadcast, which contained five TV programs and radio, was made.

== Impact ==
Comparison of the Oriental Pearl Tower with the world's seven tallest towers

=== Awards ===
In 1995, 15 foreign heads of government visited the tower. A year later, another 35 foreign heads of government and 30 groups of foreign minister-level government officials visited the tower. The tower has been included in numerous lists, including "Top Ten New Landscapes in Shanghai", "Top Ten New Landmarks in Shanghai", and the list of AAAAA Tourist Attractions of China.

=== In popular culture ===
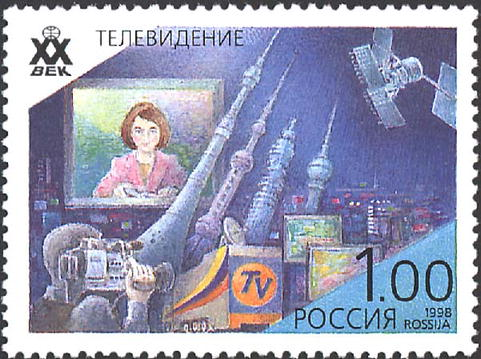
A Russian stamp depicting the tower.

Since its opening, the Oriental Pearl Tower has been a cultural icon of Shanghai. The tower has been depicted in various artworks and media and attracts millions of tourists yearly.

== See also ==
- List of tallest buildings in Shanghai
- List of tallest freestanding structures in the world
- List of the world's tallest structures
- List of towers

== Notes ==
Preceded by Jin Jiang Tower	Tallest Structure in China; 1994–2007	Succeeded by Shanghai World Financial Center
