= Haipai =

Refers to Shanghainese culture

Haipai (Chinese: 海派, Shanghainese: hepha, Wu Chinese pronunciation: [hē̞pʰä́] ; literally "[Shang]hai style") refers to the avant-garde but unique "East Meets West" culture from Shanghai in the 20th and 21st centuries. It is a part of the culture of Shanghai.

== Etymology ==
The term was coined by a group of Beijing writers in 1920 to criticize some Shanghai scholars and the styles of embracing or admiring western capitalism and western culture. The name Haipai originally came from painting and drama. According to History of Chinese Painting, which was published in 1937, "During Emperor Tongzhi's and Guangxu's reign in the Qing Dynasty, most Chinese painters lived in Shanghai and made a living by selling paintings. In order to make profits, painters catered to vulgar public taste. Their paintings gradually demonstrated Haipai style." In addition, performers of Peking opera regarded Beijing as the authority of China and they referred to cities outside Beijing as Haipai. At that time Haipai was used by scholars with contempt, as it represented unorthodox and vulgar culture. However, the meaning of Haipai has gradually changed during the following years and Haipai culture has become one of the most charming cultural styles in China. Haipai is "rebellious" while Jingpai (literally "Beijing style") is "traditional". They represent two opposing kinds of Chinese cultures and still have profound influence.

1884 map of Shanghai with foreign concessions: the British Concession in blue, the French Concession to the south in faded red and American Concession to the north in faded orange; Chinese part of the city to the south of the French Concession in faded yellow.

In modern China, Haipai culture doesn't cease or lose its attraction. On the contrary, it continues to influence modern Chinese culture. In contemporary terms, Haipai culture is seen as the symbol of diversity and inclusiveness, a special style which boasts for both orientalism and western culture. After 1949, Shanghai has become the cultural and artistic center in the eastern coastal area in China.

== Development ==
=== Emergence: 1920s–1930s ===
Haipai culture, the root of Shanghai city, came from the 1920s and 1930s. Before colonization (1843), Shanghai culture was mainly influenced and shaped by the ancient kingdoms of Wu and Yue (districts of now Jiangsu and Zhejiang Provinces). Following the defeat of China in the First Opium War by the British Empire, several ports were opened to foreign trade including Shanghai. After the issue of Nanjing Treaty in 1843, small enclaves were formed and ruled by foreign settlements (see picture). In those districts, Shanghai opened to modern urban facilities, science, and technology, as well as foreign culture. With the combination and conflict of traditional Chinese and Western culture, Haipai culture appeared during this period.

=== Prosperity：1930s–1950s ===
During this period, Haipai culture developed rapidly mainly due to the following three historical reasons. First, Shanghai was one of the first five Chinese cities that opened to the outside world. Shanghai was involved in the western capital system after its opening up and became the forerunner of Chinese modernization. The economic prosperity led to the growth of other industries, which include cultural industry. Second, Shanghai was a city of migrants and it attracted many immigrants domestically and internationally after 1843. Population growth infused great vitality into the production and consumption of cultural products. In addition, Haipai culture was inclusive and open to diversity because of the various cultural backgrounds of its citizens. Third, Shanghai concession was the biggest one in China at that time and it exerted a profound influence in the development of Haipai culture. The power of Chinese feudal government was weak in Shanghai concession, which actually paved way for the New Culture Movement and subsequent cultural innovation.

=== Transition: 1950s–1980s ===
After the establishment of People's Republic of China, Beijing was made the capital of China. Some cultural industries like Commercial Press moved to Beijing. In addition, many famous writers such as Guo Moruo, Mao Dun, and Cao Yu left Shanghai and resettled in Beijing. Haipai culture faced challenge and decline at this time. In addition, during 1966 and 1976, ten years' Cultural Revolution prevented cultural development and damaged the entire Chinese culture, which includes Haipai culture.

=== Renaissance: 1980s–present ===
The Third Plenary Session of the Eleventh Central Committee marked the official end of the Cultural Revolution and gradually resumed regular cultural activities. Drama In Silence and novel The Scar, which was written by Lu Xinhua, represented the new development of Haipai culture. In modern China, many famous Shanghai writers such as Han Han and Guo Jingming have become the spiritual flags among the young generation. Haipai culture has regained its vitality and has become more mature.

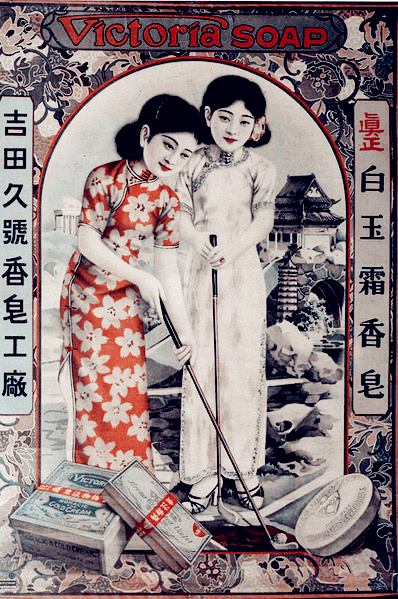
Two women wearing cheongsam in a 1930s Shanghai advertisement.

== Characteristics ==
=== Innovation ===
Due to its special geographic location, Shanghai became the forerunner to embrace novel styles, including new changes in values, behaviors, academy, fashion, and customs. Haipai culture is "rebellious" against traditional conventions and is "bold" in innovation.

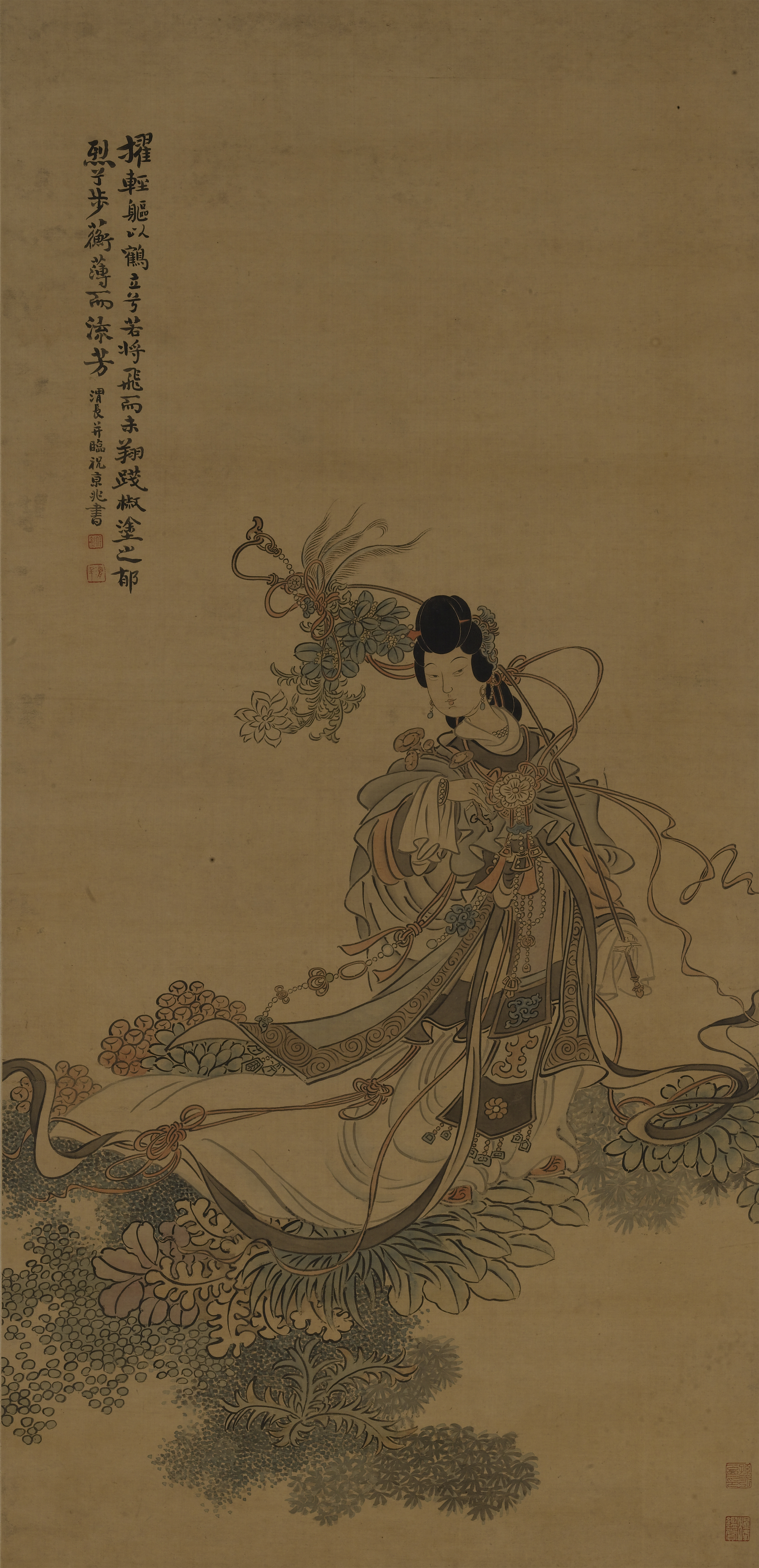
This painting portrays the Goddess of the Luo River (洛神) among lush plants in the watery depths of her domain.

During the 19th century, various new cultural undertakings and industries started in Shanghai. Haipai culture was seen as the cradle of innovation. For example, Shanghai witnessed the first modern English newspaper North China Herald, the first museum, the first women's college, the first cinema, etc.

=== Inclusiveness ===
After the opening up, massive numbers of immigrants came to Shanghai and brought their cultures to the city, which integrated Western cultures into the regional Shanghai style. The integration gave rise to the inclusive Haipai culture. In fashion, for example, Qi Pao (also known as Cheongsam) was the most popular dress for women during the 1920s and 1930s. Influenced by Western aesthetic standards, traditional Chinese qipao was shortened and became more fit (see picture). This "improved Qi Pao" soon led the fashion trend in China. Painting is another example: after 1843, painters combined traditional Chinese painting skills with the Western structural methods and color establishment. Their bold and unrestrained works, which included flower-bird paintings, landscape paintings, and character paintings, gained great popularity among ordinary people. The representative painters include Ren Xiong, Wu Changshuo, Ren Bonian, and Zhao Zhiqian.

=== Commercialism ===
Shanghai is a typical commercial city in China. Therefore, all cultural industries such as painting, singing, dancing, performing are also organized as commercial activities. One of the famous Chinese writers Lu Xun once remarked that "Jingpai is bureaucracy and Haipai is commercialism", which fully illustrated the commercial character of Haipai culture. Haipai culture targeted more at the need of the market and the common people, which brought a great impact on the elite culture. For example, after 1919, some new literary schools such as Love Birds and Butterfly School, New Sensation School emerged in Shanghai. Their works mainly focused on the romance between men and women and celebrated hedonism and materialism.

== See also ==
- Shanghainese people
- Shanghainese language

=== Haipai architecture ===
- Shikumen
- Longtang

=== Haipai arts ===
- Shanghai School (painting)
- Shanghai-style papercutting
- Shanghai opera

=== Cuisine styles of Shanghai ===
- Shanghainese cuisine
- Haipai cuisine

=== Related cultures ===
- Wuyue culture
- Chinese culture
