= Wuyue culture =

Culture of Wu-speaking Chinese people

- Simplified Chinese: 吴越文化
- Traditional Chinese: 吳越文化
Transcriptions
Standard Mandarin
- Hanyu Pinyin: Wúyuè Wénhuà

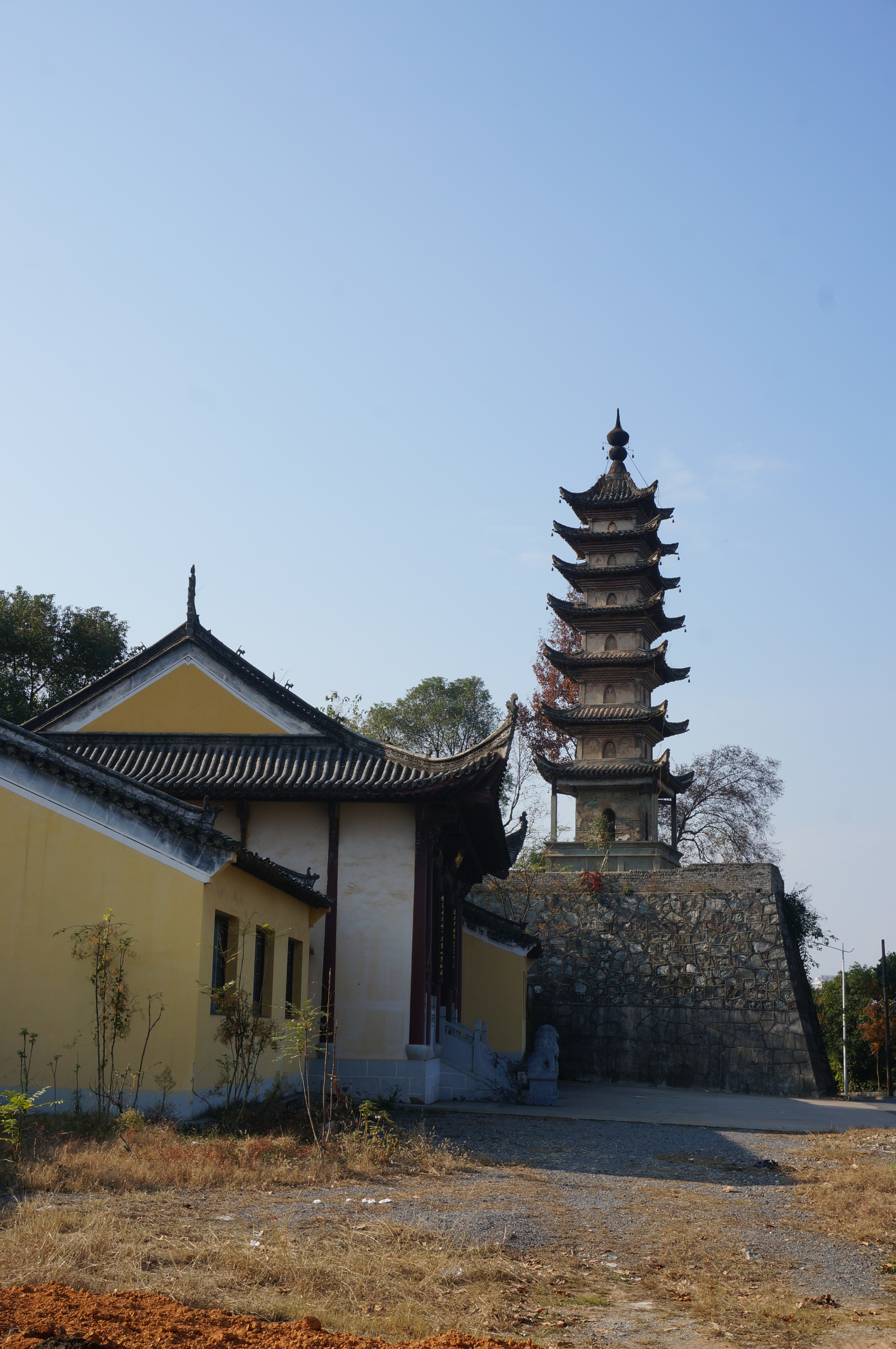
Pagoda of the Wuyue architectural style.

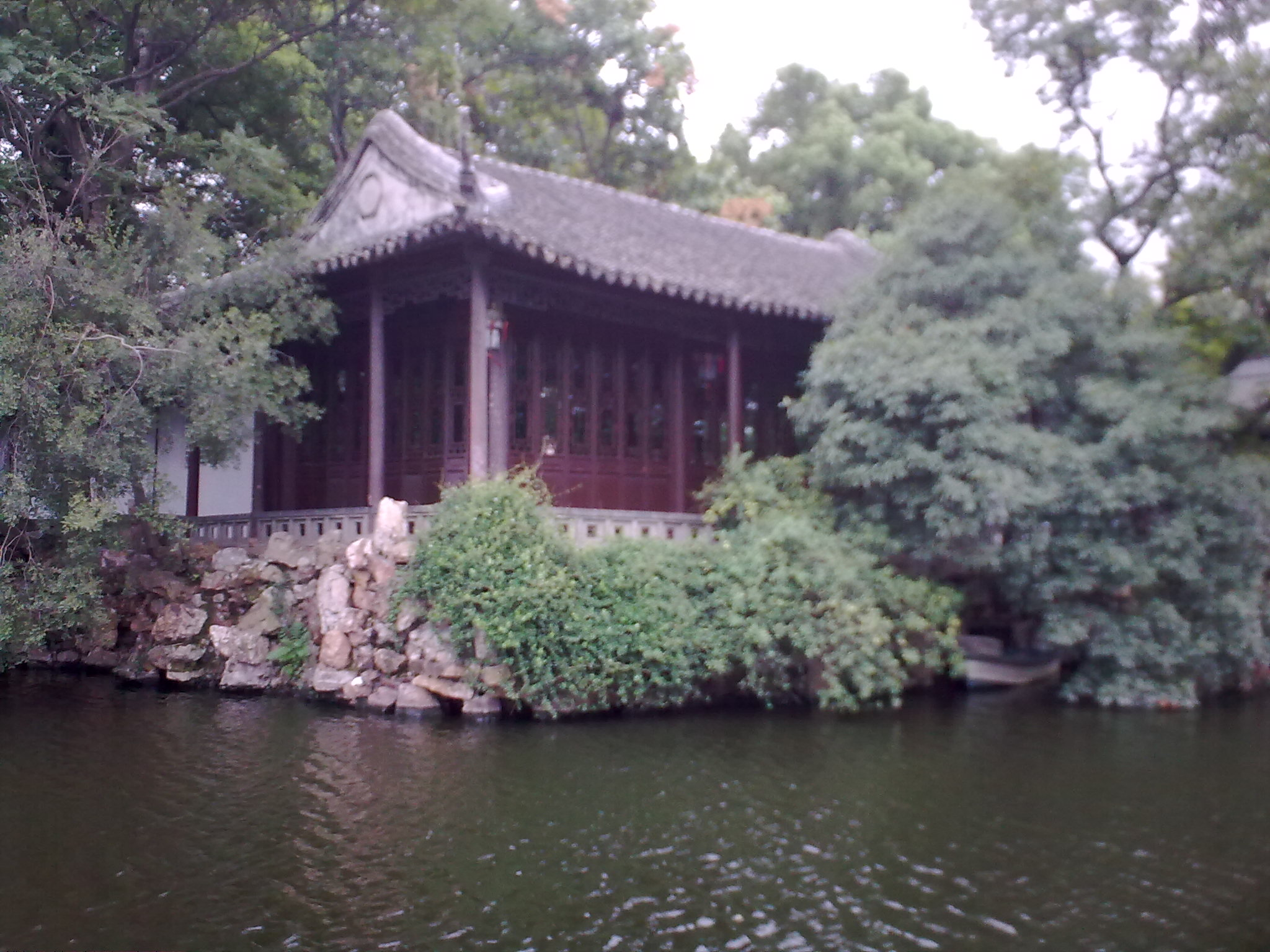
Canglang Pavilion in Suzhou

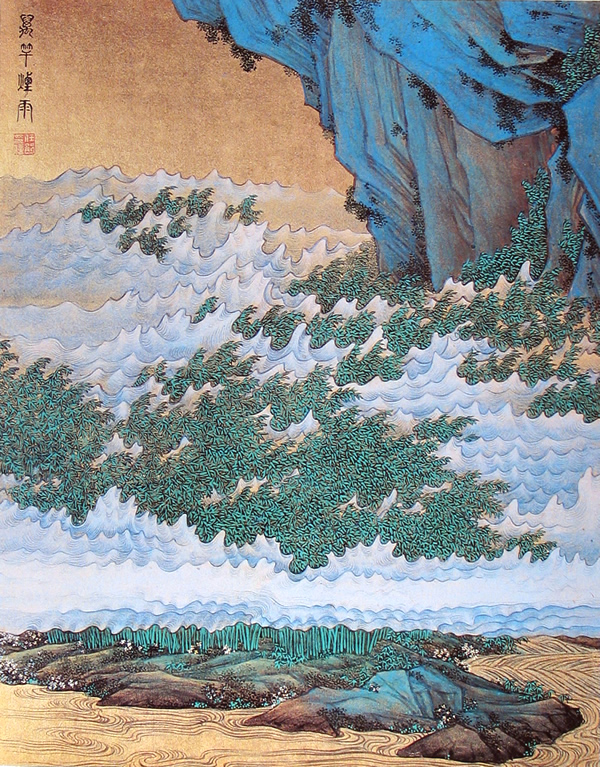
No. 4 of Hundred Thousand Scenes by Ren Xiong, a pioneer of the Shanghai School of Chinese art; ca. 1850.

Wuyue culture (simplified Chinese: 吴越文化; traditional Chinese: 吳越文化; pinyin: WúYuè wénhuà) refers to the regional Chinese culture of the Wuyue people, a Han Chinese subgroup primarily located in the Jiangnan region. The Wuyue cultural area, centered on the Taihu Lake basin, roughly corresponds to present-day southern Jiangsu, Zhejiang Province, and Shanghai. Wuyue culture is often divided into two regional variants: "Wu culture" and "Yue culture."

Closely linked to the Wu language, Wuyue culture began developing during the Zhou dynasty and later absorbed influences from northern cultures during the Jin dynasty. By the Tang dynasty, the Wuyue economy had begun to surpass that of the northern China, further extending its cultural influence. While northern Han culture was reshaped by prolonged conflicts and periods of non-Han governance, Wuyue culture preserved many elements of earlier traditional Chinese culture.

Historical records of the Wu and Yue states first appeared in written sources during the Spring and Autumn Period. The location of the original Wu capital is recorded from the time when Zhou Taibo fled to Wu, first settling in Meili and later in Gusu. Both sites lie between Suzhou and Wuxi, within the Taihu Lake region.

== See also ==
- Culture of Shanghai
- Zhongyuan culture
- Culture of Jiangxi
- Hokkien culture
- Hakka culture
- Cantonese culture
- Chinese culture
