= Paramount (Shanghai) =

Historical nightclub and dance hall

The Paramount
- Red Capitol Cinema
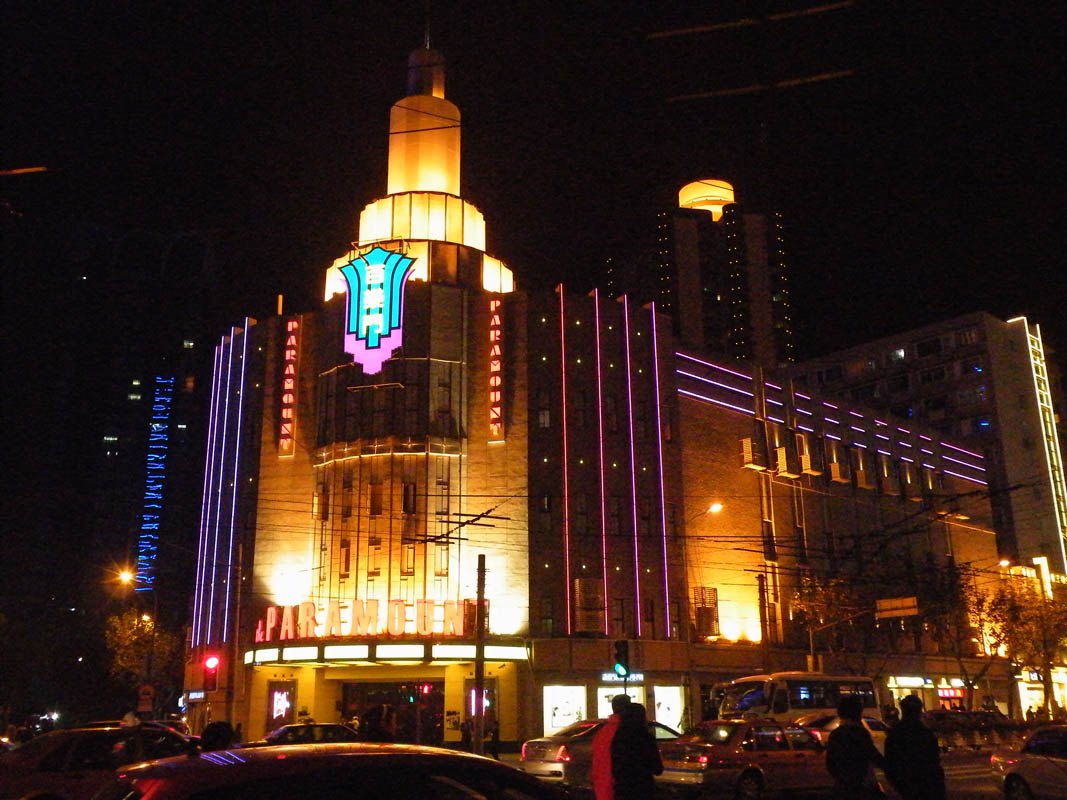
- Location: Jing'an, Shanghai, China
- Type: Ballroom cinema nightclub

Construction
- Opened: 1933
- Architect: S. J. Young (楊錫鏐 Yáng Xíliù)

The Paramount (Chinese: 百樂門; pinyin: Bǎilèmén; lit. 'Gate of 100 Pleasures') is a historical nightclub and dance hall at 218 Yuyuan Road in Jing'an, Shanghai, China. When it opened in 1933 it was the largest ballroom in Shanghai, and the most famous.

== History ==
The Paramount, designed in Art Deco style by the architect S. J. Young (楊錫鏐 Yáng Xíliù, 1899-1978) was completed in 1933, by a group of Chinese bankers. It lay just off Bubbling Well Road (now Nanjing West Road) in the western part of the city, an area of mansions and apartments houses for the wealthy elite of Shanghai society, both foreign and local.

The design featured a landmark corner with a rounded fluted exterior, emphasised by vertical neon strips and a glowing spire. The main dance hall was entered from the ground level through an octagonal lobby then up to the first floor to a circular room above, then into a double height space with a spring dance floor and surrounding balcony. A smaller dancefloor on the balcony had a glass floor with coloured lighting, and there were smaller bars and banquet rooms on this floor. Notable patrons included gangster Du Yuesheng, the Stead sisters, and Charlie Chaplin in 1936.

The original owners went bankrupt in 1936, and in 1937, it was converted into a taxi dance hall featuring Chinese dance hostesses.

In 1956, following the 1949 Chinese Communist Revolution, the Paramount was closed and was largely rebuilt inside as the Red Capitol Cinema showing Maoist propaganda films, and the glass spire removed. The following decades saw it decay from a lack of maintenance, and on a rainy day in 1990, part of the canopy collapsed and killed a passerby on a sidewalk. In 1993, the glass spire was reconstructed but different to the original.

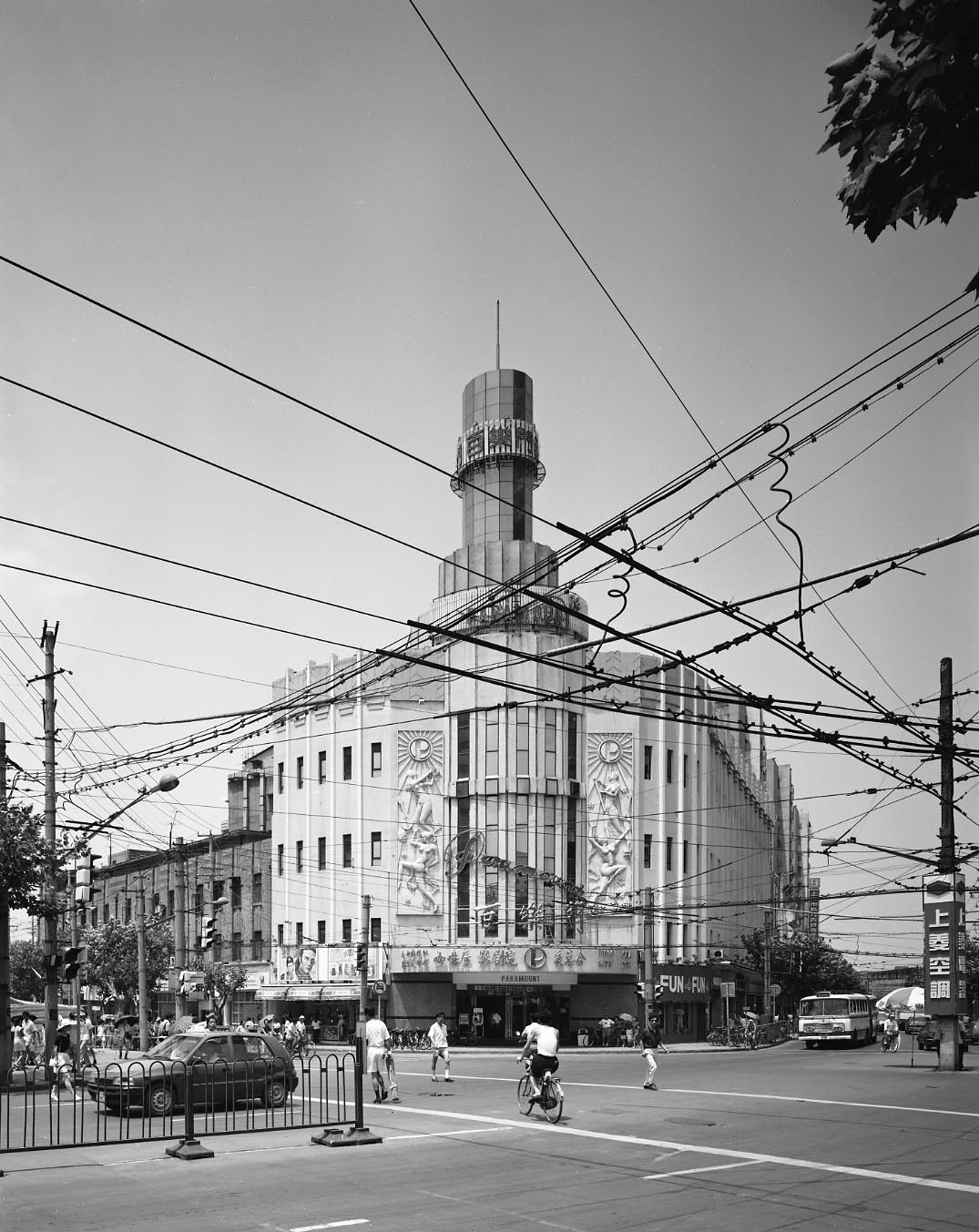
The Paramount Theatre photographed in July 1994.

In 2001, Taiwanese investors spent $3-million to refurbish the venue. The exterior was restored, and a large ballroom created with Art Deco details, in red-and-gold, but different from the original.

In December 2006, the Paramount's Taiwanese owners announced the ballroom was losing revenue, so they decided to convert the second and third floors into a disco. Preservationists have expressed concerns that the structure could be damaged by the reverberations of the disco.

In 2012, Fuchsia Dunlop reported on a visit to the fourth floor ballroom on a quiet evening for the BBC Radio Program: "From Our Own Correspondent".

In March 2017, the Paramount reopened as a nightclub after a three year renovation that restored the glass spire to its original appearance.

The Paramount building in 2015
