= Shanghai-style papercutting =

Shanghai-style papercutting is a variety of papercutting practiced in south China, and in particular in Shanghai.

The making of papercuts is a popular folk art in China. In the hands of an artisan, and with the help of a knife or a pair of scissors, a piece of paper can be turned into any of a wide variety of patterns – landscapes, flowers, birds, animals and human figures. These simple works of art may be displayed in wall frames or pressed under glass and displayed to decorate a room.

Traditional North Chinese papercut works are mostly patterns of auspicious symbols, patterns, with strong traditional features. While Shanghai-style papercutting, based on applied arts such as Chuanghua (papercut for window decoration, Chinese: 窗花), or embroidery, does not adhere to the traditional symbols. Its subjects and designs are relatively more simple and modern. More uniquely, Shanghai-style papercuts, regardless of their size and complexity, are all cut at one time and the cut flowers, grasses and animals, are all attached together.

Different from the traditional red papercut, the most obvious feature of Shanghai-style papercut is its colors and patterns. Waste paper such as flyer paper, newspapers, envelopes are all used as the materials for creating these works. Shanghai-style artists make use of the original colors of the paper to conceive the design, the colors and patterns of their works.

Shanghai culture and arts is an important part of Chinese arts and craft. Shanghai since its inception in 1843, Started from the closed Wuyue regional smallholder city to become a coastal modern cities, called "The Jianghai Tongjin, southeast of the city". It is in such an open and emerging cities, breeding and the formation of The Shanghai Arts and Crafts, the Beijing School of Arts and Crafts Arts and Crafts of Guangdong faction formed with distinct regional characteristics.
