= Robert Weinberg =

Robert Weinberg may refer to:

- Robert Weinberg (urban planner) (1902–1974)
- Robert Weinberg (biologist) (born 1942)
- Robert Weinberg (author) (1946–2016)
