= Hearst Tower (Manhattan) =

Office building in Manhattan, New York

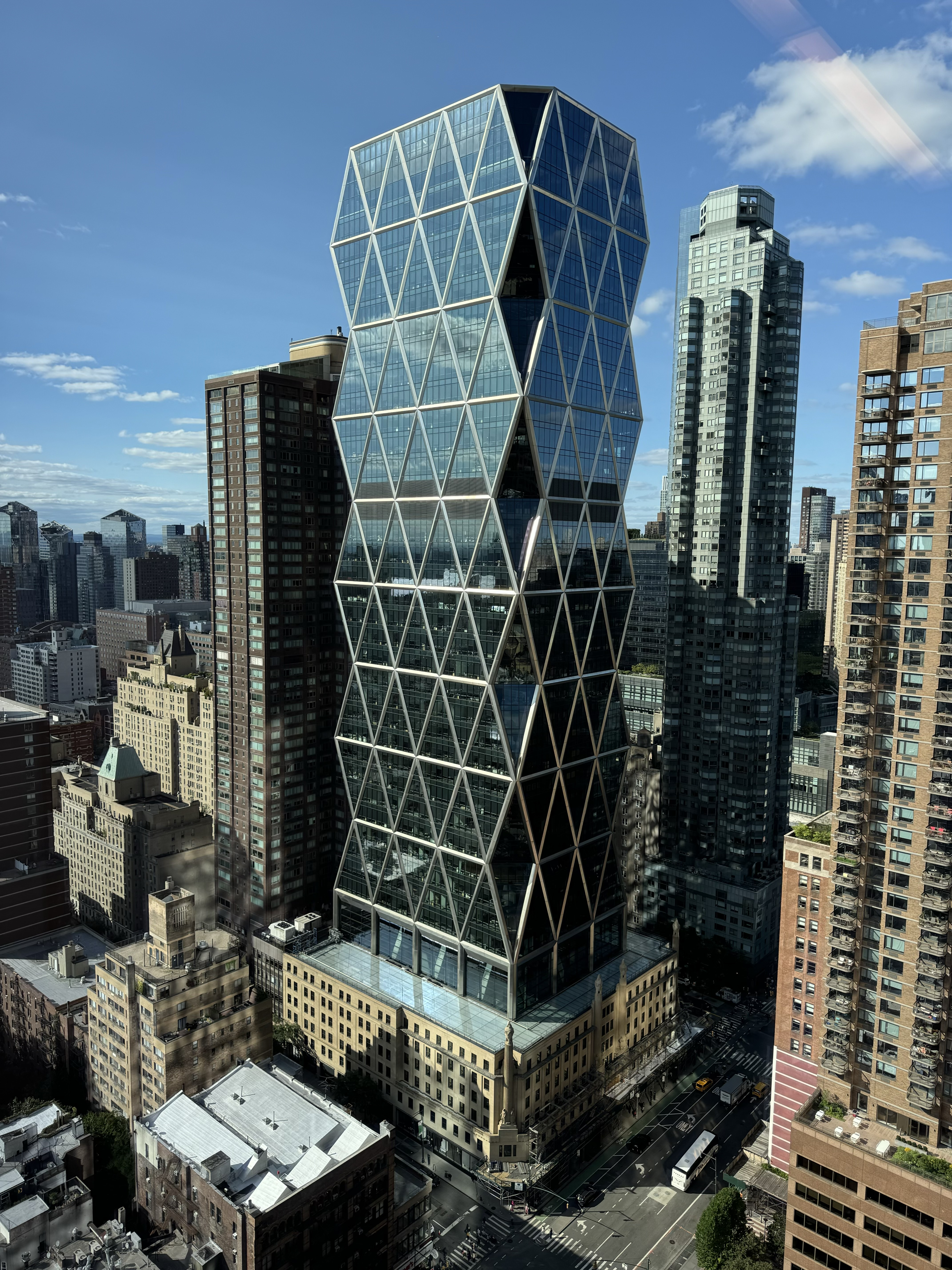
- Seen from the south in 2024
- Interactive map of the Hearst Tower area

General information
- Status: In operation
- Type: Office building
- Architectural style: Structural expressionism
- Location: 300 West 57th Street; 959 Eighth Avenue, Manhattan, New York, U.S.
- Coordinates: 40°46′00″N 73°59′01″W
- Construction started: 1927 (original building); April 2003 (tower)
- Completed: 1928 (original building); 2006 (tower)
- Cost: $500 million

Height
- Roof: 597 ft (182 m)

Technical details
- Floor count: 46
- Floor area: 856,000 square feet (79,525 m^{2})
- Lifts/elevators: 21

Design and construction
- Architects: Joseph Urban and George B. Post & Sons (original building); Norman Foster and Adamson Associates Architects (tower)
- Developer: Tishman Speyer
- Structural engineer: WSP Cantor Seinuk
- Main contractor: Turner Construction
- Awards: International Highrise Award; 2008

New York City Landmark
- Designated: February 16, 1988
- Reference no.: 1925
- Designated entity: Hearst Magazine Building

The Hearst Tower is a skyscraper at the southwest corner of 57th Street and Eighth Avenue, near Columbus Circle, in the Midtown Manhattan neighborhood of New York City, United States. It is the world headquarters of media conglomerate Hearst Communications, housing many of the firm's publications and communications companies. The Hearst Tower consists of two sections, with a total height of 597 feet (182 m) and 46 stories. The six lowest stories form the Hearst Magazine Building (also known as the International Magazine Building), designed by Joseph Urban and George B. Post & Sons, which was completed in 1928. Above it is the Hearst Tower addition, designed by Norman Foster and finished in 2006.

The building's main entrance is on Eighth Avenue. The original structure is clad with stone and contains six pylons with sculptural groups. The tower section above has a glass-and-metal facade arranged as a diagrid, or diagonal grid, which doubles as its structural system. The original office space in the Hearst Magazine Building was replaced with an atrium during the Hearst Tower's construction. The tower is certified as a green building as part of the Leadership in Energy and Environmental Design (LEED) program.

The Hearst Magazine Building's developer William Randolph Hearst acquired the site for a theater in the mid-1920s, in the belief that the area would become the city's next large entertainment district, but changed his plans to construct a magazine headquarters there. The original building was developed as the base for a larger tower, which was postponed because of the Great Depression. A subsequent expansion proposal during the 1940s also failed. The New York City Landmarks Preservation Commission designated the facade of the original building as a city landmark in 1988. After Hearst Communications considered expanding the structure again during the 1980s, the tower stories were built in the first decade of the 21st century.

== Site ==
The Hearst Tower is on the border of the Hell's Kitchen and Midtown Manhattan neighborhoods of New York City, United States. Located two blocks south of Columbus Circle, it is bounded by 56th Street on the south, Eighth Avenue on the east, and 57th Street on the north. The building faces Central Park Place on the north, 3 Columbus Circle on the northeast, and Random House Tower on the east. It is one block south of Deutsche Bank Center (formerly Time Warner Center) and 2 Columbus Circle. The base of the Hearst Tower has three street addresses: 951–969 Eighth Avenue, 301–313 West 56th Street, and 302–312 West 57th Street. The site is a nearly-square lot covering 40,166 square feet (3,731.5 m^{2}) and measuring 200 by 200.83 feet (60.96 by 61.21 m). Entrances to the New York City Subway's 59th Street–Columbus Circle station are at the structure's base.

The building is near a former artistic hub around a two-block section of West 57th Street between Sixth Avenue and Broadway. The hub had been developed during the late 19th and early 20th centuries, after the opening of Carnegie Hall on Seventh Avenue in 1891. The area contained the headquarters of several organizations, such as the American Fine Arts Society, the Lotos Club, and the ASCE Society House. Although the original Hearst Magazine Building was just outside the artistic hub, its proximity to these institutions was a factor in the choice of its location. By the 21st century, the arts hub had largely been replaced with Billionaires' Row, a series of luxury skyscrapers around the southern end of Central Park.

Immediately prior to the construction of the Hearst Magazine Building in the 1920s, the site was referred to as the Hegeman site. Sixteen people had owned the land, which was largely vacant except for an open-air movie theater and some stores.

== Architecture ==
The original six-story structure, known as the Hearst Magazine Building or the International Magazine Building, was designed by the architect Joseph Urban and the architectural firm George B. Post & Sons. Completed in 1928 and intended as the base of a future tower, the Hearst Magazine Building was designed in early Art Deco style. Henry Kreis designed six sculpture groups at the third story. The Hearst Magazine Building is the only survivor of an unbuilt entertainment complex which its developer, Hearst Communications' founder William Randolph Hearst, envisioned for Columbus Circle in the early 20th century. The tower was designed by Norman Foster and completed in 2006, almost eight decades after the base was built. The Hearst Corporation and Tishman Speyer developed the tower; WSP Global was the structural engineer, and Turner Construction was the main contractor. The design of the tower section was influenced by the need to retain the lowest stories, which were protected as a city landmark.

The two sections have a combined height of 597 feet (182 m), with 46 stories above ground. Its base occupies nearly the whole lot and originally contained floors, arranged in a "U" shape, flanking a courtyard on the west. The courtyard abuts a residential tower called the Sheffield, which sits directly on the Hearst Magazine Building's western lot line. Along much of the base, the third through sixth stories are slightly set back from the lowest two floors. The original building's roof was 70 feet (21 m) above ground. The upper stories are more deeply set back from the lowest six floors on the north, east, and south sides and are directly adjacent to the Sheffield on the west. Each of the upper stories has a footprint of 160 by 120 feet (49 by 37 m), with the longer dimension extending from east to west. The setbacks above the sixth floor contain a skylight 40 feet (12 m) wide.

The Hearst Tower has 856,000 square feet (79,500 m^{2}) of office space. According to the New York City Department of City Planning, the building has a gross floor area of 703,796 square feet (65,384.8 m^{2}). The tower received a zoning bonus which enabled its maximum floor area to be expanded by six floors or 120,000 square feet (11,000 m^{2}), a 20% increase from the previous maximum allowed floor area of 600,000 square feet (56,000 m^{2}). The Hearst Corporation agreed to improve access to the subway station underneath in return, adding three elevators and reconfiguring the station's circulation areas. Without the zoning amendment, the Hearst Corporation might have had to pay up to $10 million for additional air rights, as the company had already used up all the air rights above the Hearst Magazine Building.

=== Facade ===
==== Base ====
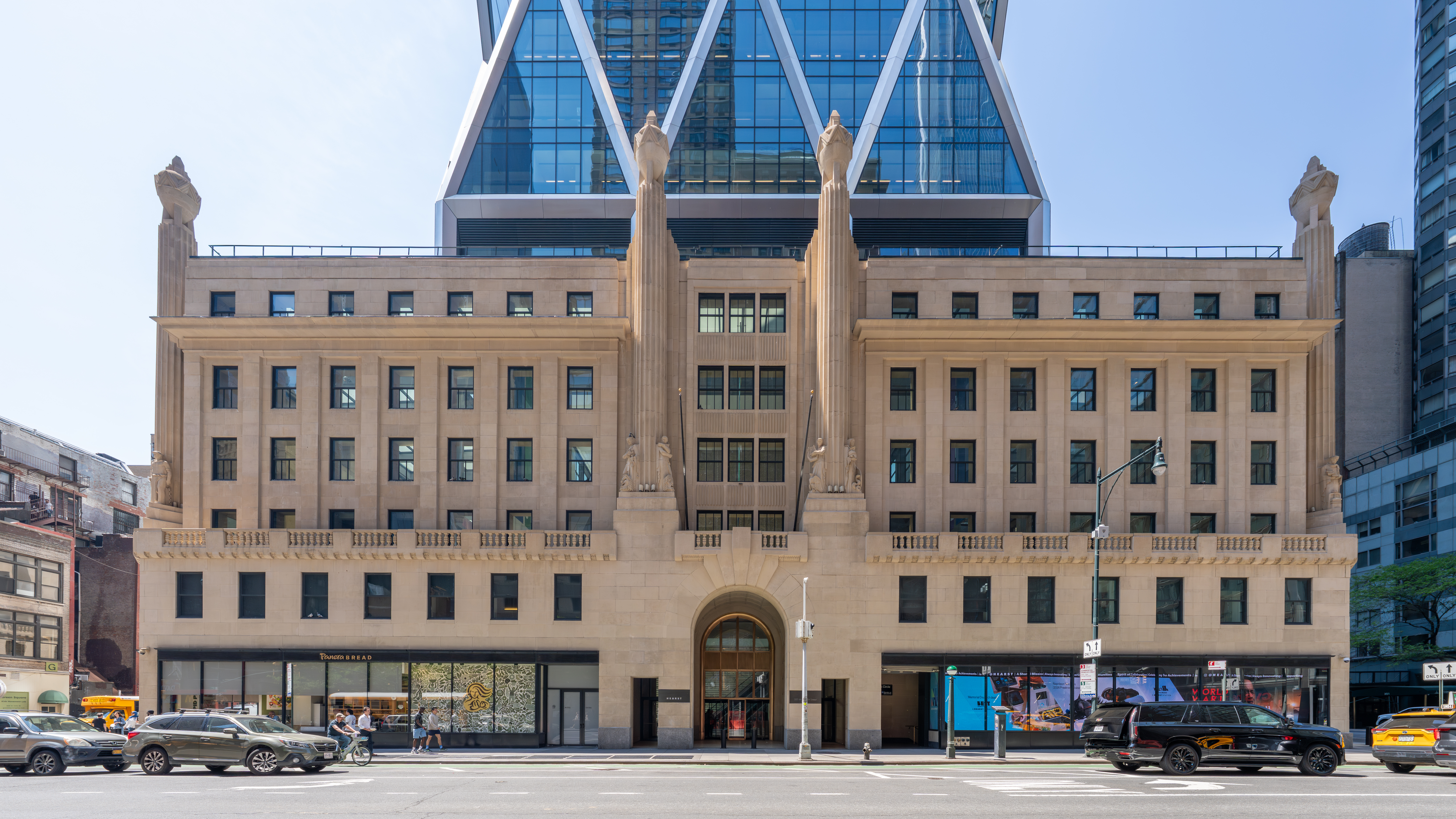
The 57th Street facade in 2026

The cast-limestone facade of the Hearst Magazine Building, now the base, is a New York City designated landmark with 450,000 square feet (42,000 m^{2}) of surface area. It is divided horizontally into the two lowest stories, three intermediate stories, and a sixth-story attic. The base's northeastern and southeastern corners are chamfered (angled). A balustrade is in front of the third-story windows, supported by a shelf with notches and interrupted by the chamfered corners. A parapet is above the fifth story, except in the bays above the entrance arches on Eighth Avenue and 57th Street and at the chamfered corners. With the construction of the Hearst Tower, the base's facade was retrofitted to meet updated city seismic codes. Because the original office space was replaced with an atrium in the Hearst Tower's construction, the windows on the third through sixth stories of the facade illuminate the atrium. Only the first two stories of the original building retain their original usage.

The main entrance, at the center of the Eighth Avenue elevation, contains a large archway flanked by a pair of smaller, rectangular doorways. The archway has gray granite panels at its base and voussoirs and a beveled keystone at its top, overlapping with a balcony. The barrel-vaulted vestibule inside the archway contains embossed octagonal coffers. The far western end of the vestibule has an entrance with a bronze frame and four glass doors beneath a bronze-and-glass transom. There is a subway entrance on the right (north) side of the Eighth Avenue entrance vestibule. On either side of the entrance arch, the Eighth Avenue elevation contains glass and metal storefronts at ground level and seven sash windows on the second story. On 57th Street, a former secondary entrance was altered to create a storefront topped by a window. There is another subway entrance on the left of the original doorway. The remainder of the ground-story facades at 57th and 56th Streets also contain glass and metal storefronts, with loading docks on the far western section of the 56th Street facade.

The base contains six pylons, which are supported by stone pedestals with allegorical sculptural groupings on the third story and topped by sculpted urns above the sixth story. The pylons indicate that the building was originally planned as a theater. The centers of the Eighth Avenue and 57th Street facades are identical, with two pylons each. The left pylon on both entrances contains sculpture groups depicting comedy and tragedy, and the right pylon contains sculptures representing music and art. Similar pylons rise in front of the northeast and southeast corners of the base. The northeast-corner pylon contains a group representing printing and the sciences, and the southeast-corner pylon has a group representing sports and industry.

Between the pairs of pylons on Eighth Avenue and on 57th Street, on each of the third through sixth stories, is a tripartite window with fluted stone spandrels. The Eighth Avenue and 57th Street elevations contain seven bays, on either side of the vertical bay, which are set back above the second story. The third through fifth stories of these elevations have sash windows, slightly recessed behind the main facade, and the sixth-story windows are flush with the cast-stone facade. The setback and window arrangement are carried around to the eight eastern bays on 56th Street. The two westernmost bays on 57th Street and the twelve westernmost bays on 56th Street are not set back above the second story, and do not contain third-story balustrades. The third-through-fifth story bays on the western section of the 56th Street facade are grouped into six pairs, separated by pilasters which were designed to emphasize the upper, never-built stories.

==== Tower ====
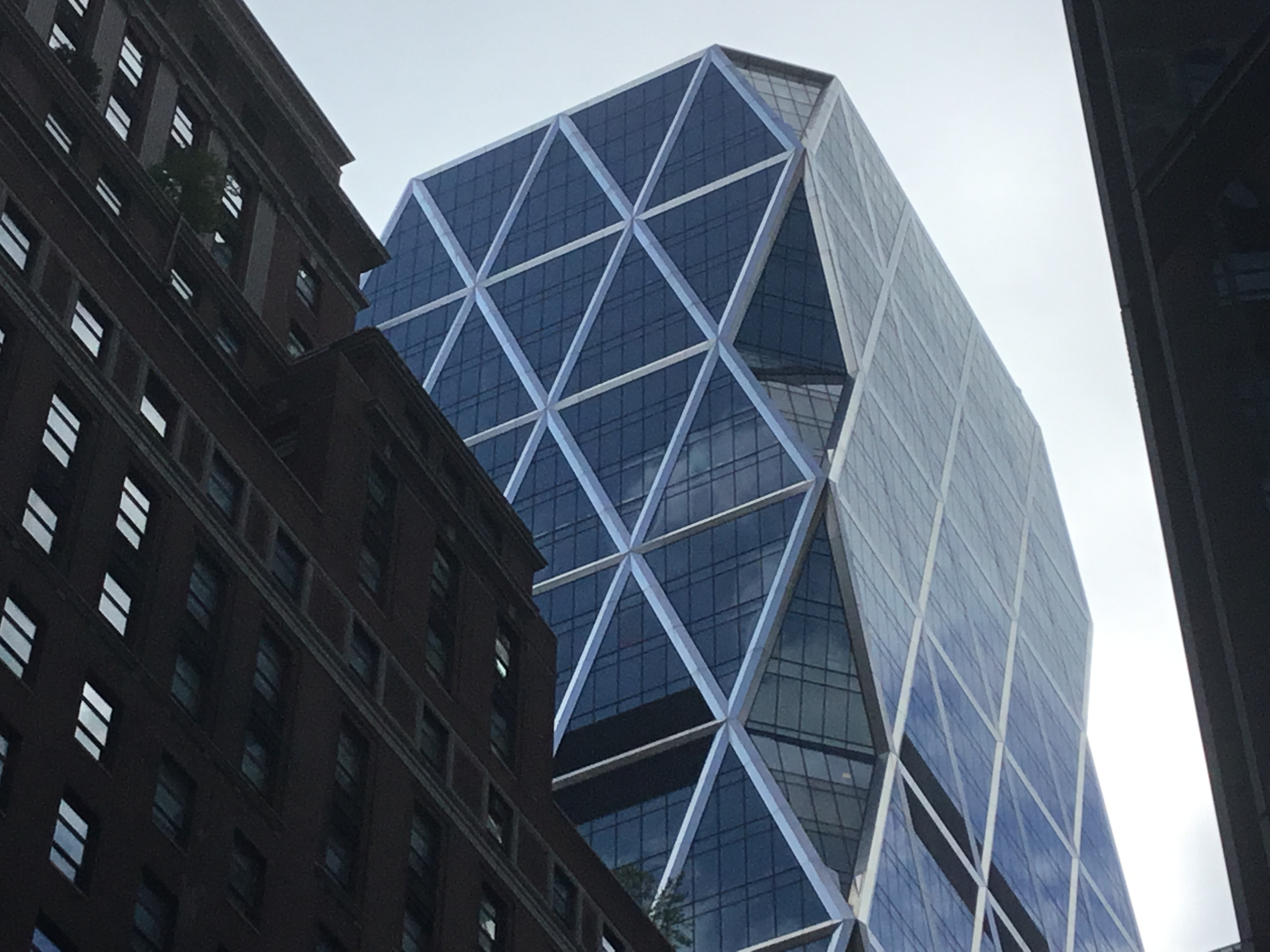
The facade of the Hearst Tower's upper stories, seen in August 2021

A clerestory wraps around the seventh through tenth floors atop the base, structurally separating the tower from the base. The tower facade has a triangular framing pattern known as a diagrid (short for "diagonal grid") above the tenth floor, which is the tower's structural support system. The structural system, similar to the Commerzbank Tower in Frankfurt and 30 St Mary Axe in London, was developed in conjunction with Ysrael Seinuk. It was one of the first large-scale uses of a diagrid.

The diagrid divides the tower's sides horizontally into eight tiers, each measuring four stories high. Additional diagonal beams divide the facade into alternating upright and inverted triangles, which intersect at "nodes" along points of the facade. The arrangement of the diagrid creates chamfered "birds' mouths" at the tower's corners at the 14th, 22nd, 30th, and 38th floors; the lower and upper sections of the birds' mouths slope outward from a recessed central section. The New York Times wrote that the beams and "birds' mouths" run at a 75-degree angle to the horizontal floor slabs; another author cites the beams as running at a 65-degree angle.

The triangles in the diagrid are prefabricated panels, which were manufactured by the Cives Steel Company in New York and Virginia. Each of the triangles is 52 feet (16 m) tall. The diagonal beams are typically 57 feet (17 m) long by 40 feet (12 m) wide. The columns are bolted, rather than welded, to each other at the nodes. The diagrid required 10,480 short tons (9,360 long tons; 9,510 t) of structural steel, 20% less than what would have normally been required for a building of similar size. The amount of recycled steel in the diagrid is variously cited as 85% or more than 90%. The exterior curtain wall was constructed by Permasteelisa, which mounted 3,200 glass panels on the facade. The panels are typically 13.5 feet (4.1 m) tall by 5 feet (1.5 m) wide, although 625 of them were built to custom specifications.

Because of the facade's intricate design, the tower's window cleaning rig took three years and $3 million to plan. It incorporates "a rectangular steel box the size of a Smart car" on the roof, which hoists a 40-foot (12 m) mast and a hydraulic boom arm. Sixty-seven sensors and switches are housed in the box. A window-cleaning deck hangs from the hydraulic boom arm, supported by six wire-rope strands. The rig, installed in April 2005 on 420 feet (130 m) of elevated steel track circling the tower's roof, snapped in 2013 and trapped two window cleaners.

=== Features ===
==== Structural features ====
The Hearst Magazine Building is supported almost completely by the steel columns on its perimeter. The original framework was intended to support at least seven additional stories. Joseph Urban's original plans for the tower are no longer extant, if they ever existed at all, but, by some accounts, it would have been up to 20 stories tall. (Note: Because of zoning regulations in place at the time of the Hearst Magazine Building's completion, the additional stories would likely have been much smaller than the base.) The Hearst Magazine Building had six elevator shafts, double or triple the expected number of elevators for a building of its size. A white-brick penthouse was completed above the sixth story for future expansion of the elevators. The Hearst Magazine Building's original framework was removed when the Hearst Tower was built in the 2000s. Its structure was hollowed out for the atrium of the expanded building, and new columns were installed behind the facade. "Mega columns" extend down from the perimeter of the tower, and the existing frame and new columns are connected with beams at the third and seventh stories. Eight 90-foot-long (27 m) "super-diagonals" slope from the third to the tenth floors, being constructed in the shape of the letter "V".

The Hearst Tower has twenty-one elevators. Its stairways and elevators are in a service core along the west side, the only elevation of the facade that does not face a street. The original plan called for the service core to be at the center of the tower, but it was redesigned after the September 11 attacks in 2001 as a security precaution against possible attacks from the street. The offset core also enables the office floors to have an open plan without interior columns; aside from the core, the building includes only two interior columns on each floor. The offset core reduced the number of windows that faced the adjacent Sheffield apartment building to the west. To compensate for the offset service core and lack of interior columns, the tower's weight is supported by the exterior diagrid (which is braced by the service core).

Since the layer of bedrock under the Hearst Tower varies in depth, the tower's foundation was built with two methods. Bedrock is only a few feet under half of the basement, and spread footings were used. Under the other half of the basement, where bedrock is a maximum of 30 feet (9.1 m) down, twenty-one caissons were installed.

==== Interior ====
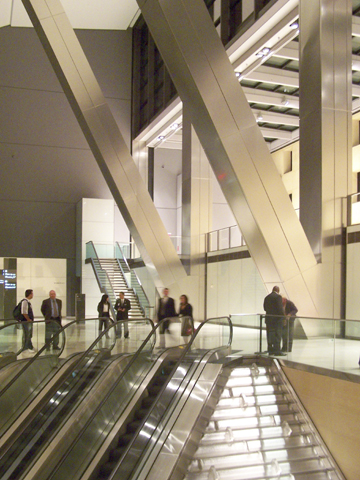
Interior of the lobby as seen from Cafe 57, the Hearst Tower cafeteria

The Hearst Magazine Building initially contained office space with 11-foot (3.4 m) ceilings. When the tower was built, the original building's office space was demolished and replaced by a 95-foot-tall (29 m) atrium, which Norman Foster intended would be used as a communal space. The atrium has a volume of 1,700,000 cubic feet (48,000 m^{3}) and includes a lobby covering 39,000 square feet (3,600 m^{2}). The lobby, accessed by escalators from the Eighth Avenue entrance, is on the third story of the original building. The escalators run diagonally through a waterfall called Icefall, which measures 27 by 75 feet (8.2 by 22.9 m) across. The waterfall is complemented by Riverlines, a 70-foot-tall (21 m) fresco by Richard Long. The atrium has two mezzanines; one contains a 380-seat cafeteria, and the other houses an exhibition area. The cafeteria, Cafe 57, is used by Hearst employees and visitors. The north side of the atrium has a screening room. Two storefronts are at ground level under the atrium: an anchor space with about 12,000 square feet (1,100 m^{2}), and another space with about 2,500 square feet (230 m^{2}).

The tower's office space begins at the tenth story, which is 110 feet (34 m) high and slightly above the roof of the atrium. Each tower story covers 22,000 square feet (2,000 m^{2}), and has 13.5-foot (4.1 m) ceilings. The floors were designed to house many Hearst publications and communications companies, including Cosmopolitan, Esquire, Marie Claire, Harper's Bazaar, Good Housekeeping, and Seventeen. In addition to Hearst offices, the tower has a staff fitness center on the 14th floor, and there are executive rooms on the 44th floor. The executive floor has triple-height spaces at each corner and at the center. Due to the presence of the birds' mouths on the facade, the areas of each floor slab vary between 17,000 and 20,000 square metres (180,000 and 220,000 sq ft).

The tower has several design features intended to meet green building standards as part of the Leadership in Energy and Environmental Design (LEED) program. The limestone-clad floor slabs of the atrium and office floors contain polyethylene tubes for heated (or cooled) water to regulate temperature and humidity. A 14,000-US-gallon (53,000 L) tank in the basement collects rainwater from the building's roof; some of the recycled water is pumped through the lobby's waterfall or is used to water the plants in the atrium. The furniture and lights were designed to be energy-efficient as well. Two executive stories have daylight dimming systems, which dim when there is sunlight; the other office stories have daylight switching systems, which turn off when there is sunlight. About 85% of the material from the old building's interior was recycled for use in the tower's construction. These features save about 2 million kilowatt-hours (7,200,000 MJ) per year.

== History ==
William Randolph Hearst moved to New York City in 1895, and became a successful magazine magnate over the following three decades. He envisioned the creation of a large Midtown headquarters around Columbus Circle in the belief that the area would become the city's next large entertainment district. From 1895 to the mid-1920s, Hearst bought several large plots around the circle for his headquarters. (Note: Hearst's first purchase was the city block bounded by 58th Street, Eighth Avenue, and Broadway, now the site of 2 Columbus Circle, in 1895. He bought the block to the south, now 3 Columbus Circle, in 1903. Eight years after that, Hearst bought a plot on the northern side of Columbus Circle. In 1921, Hearst completed his acquisition of lots on the northern side of 58th Street west of Eighth Avenue. The plot facing 61st Street was the only one to be even partially developed.) Hearst also believed that Manhattan's Theater District would extend to Columbus Circle and became interested in theater partially because of his mistress, the actress Marion Davies. Hearst hired Joseph Urban for several early-20th-century theater projects—including the Criterion, Cosmopolitan, and Ziegfeld theaters—and the men became close friends.

=== Original development ===
By early 1924, Hearst had obtained an option to acquire a 200-by-200-foot site along Eighth Avenue from 56th to 57th Street, near the 57th Street artistic hub. That April, he acquired the property title for the site. Hearst gradually acquired large areas of land around the intersection of Eighth Avenue and 57th Street, though none of the other sites were developed. Metropolitan Opera's director, Otto Hermann Kahn, had begun planning a new opera house to replace an existing building at 39th Street and Broadway at the same time, spending $3 million in late 1925 to acquire the site west of Hearst's lot. Plans for the 57th Street opera house were made public in January 1926, but the Met abandoned the plans two years later. (Note: The Met site was sold off in 1930 and was developed the next year as the Parc Vendome apartment building. A plan to incorporate a Metropolitan Opera House in the construction of Rockefeller Center was also unsuccessful.)

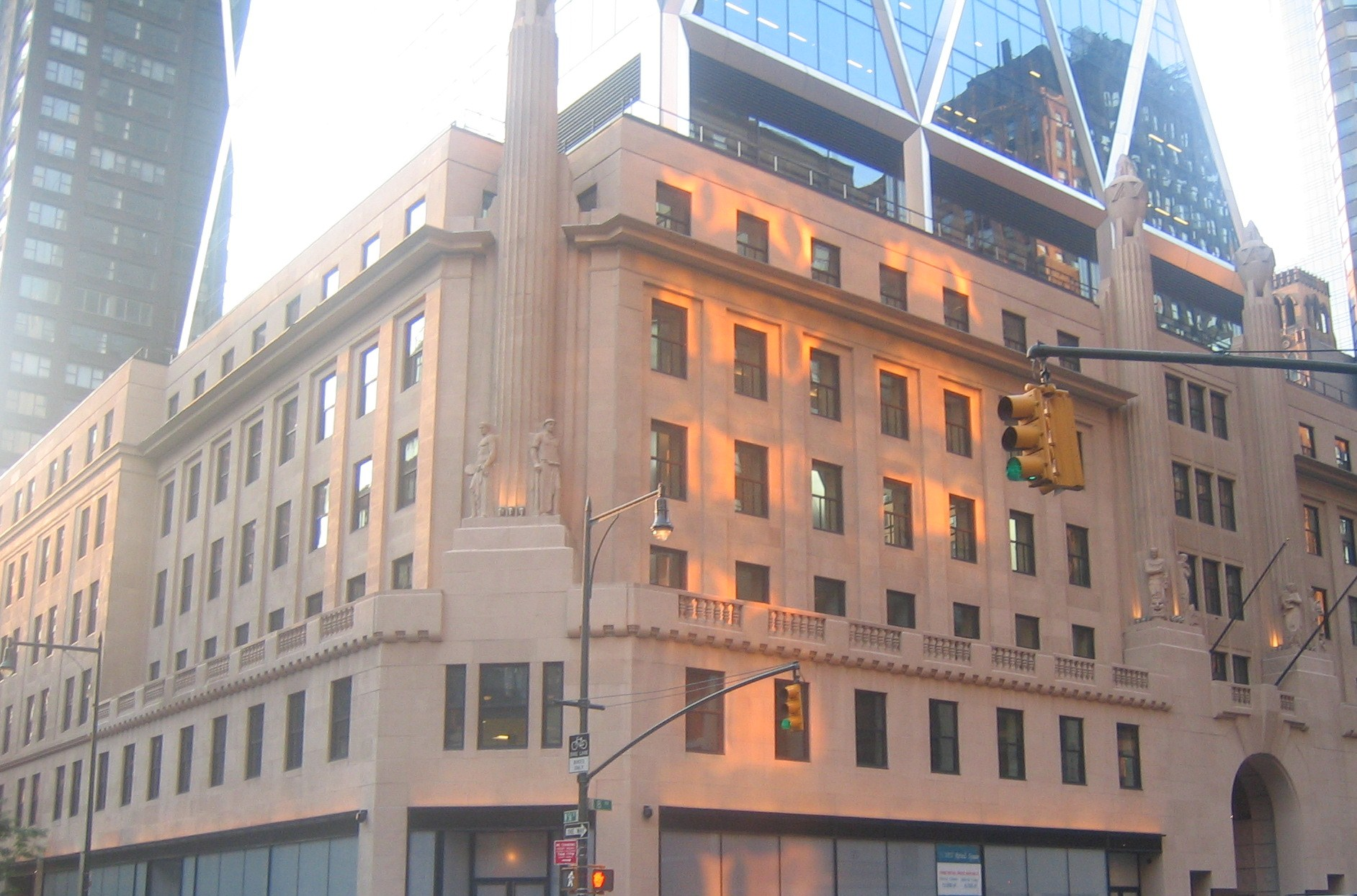
The Hearst Magazine Building was built as the base of a future tower.

In conjunction with the canceled opera house, Hearst originally planned to construct a two-story office and retail building with a 2,500-seat theater designed by Michael Bernstein. This was subsequently changed to a six-story office and theater building, designed by Thomas W. Lamb. Hearst's magazines were slated to be published three blocks west, on a block bounded by 11th and 12th Avenues between 54th and 55th Streets. The 11th Avenue site was abandoned by August 1926 and Hearst had replaced Lamb, hiring Urban to design a magazine headquarters for the Eighth Avenue site. In hiring Urban, Hearst specified that he wanted the new building to have a "conspicuous architectural character". The proposed magazine headquarters was a skyscraper, and so Hearst hired George B. Post & Sons, who had experience building skyscrapers.

The final design called for a six-story, U-shaped building, which would support a nine-story structure to be built above it in the future. Excavation of the Hearst Magazine Building had begun by June 1927. The section of Eighth Avenue between 42nd and 59th Streets was experiencing rapid development, with surrounding real-estate values increasing 200% since the beginning of the 1920s. This was, in part, due to the development of the Independent Subway System's Eighth Avenue Line and zoning regulations which permitted skyscrapers along that section of Eighth Avenue. By January 1928, the Hearst Magazine Building was nearly completed, having cost $2 million (equivalent to $28.8 million in 2024).

=== Hearst Magazine Building ===
In mid-1928, shortly after the Hearst Magazine Building was finished, Urban and Post drew up plans for a street-level 1,000-seat concert hall with a 600-seat secondary auditorium in the basement and a planned 1929 completion date. The Hearst Corporation acquired the land under the building in 1930 for $2.25 million or $2.5 million. With the onset of the Great Depression shortly after the Hearst Magazine Building's completion, planning for its upper stories stalled for over a decade. The New York Evening Journal, one of Hearst's newspapers, transferred ownership of the building to Hearst Magazines in 1937 as part of a reorganization of Hearst Corporation properties. At the time, the building was valued at $3.253 million (equivalent to $55.61 million in 2024); Hearst owed $126 million (equivalent to $2.15 billion in 2024) and was selling his holdings. He considered borrowing an additional $35.5 million, part of which was to repurchase the Hearst Magazine Building, but ultimately reconsidered.

In 1945, George B. Post & Sons prepared plans for nine additional stories. The plans were filed with the New York City Department of Buildings the following year, when the tower was estimated to cost $1.3 million, but the additional stories were never completed. A New York City Landmarks Preservation Commission (LPC) report about the building did not specify a reason for the cancellation of the addition. Norman Foster, who designed the tower section several decades later, did not find any records pertaining to a nine-story tower addition. The Hearst Magazine Building retained most of its original architecture throughout the 20th century, though the ground-level storefronts were replaced in 1970.

The Hearst Corporation again began planning a tower atop the Hearst Magazine Building in the early 1980s. A restoration of the building had then been recently completed. During much of that decade, the Hearst Corporation rapidly acquired media companies such as magazines, publishers, and television stations. In 1982, the LPC began considering city-landmark designation for the Hearst Magazine Building. Further discussions of landmark status took place in 1987, and the LPC granted landmark status to the building's facade on February 16, 1988. The designation meant that the LPC had to approve any proposed changes to the Hearst Magazine Building's exterior. Beyer Blinder Belle proposed a 34-story green-glass tower during the late 1980s, which did not come to fruition.

=== Tower addition ===
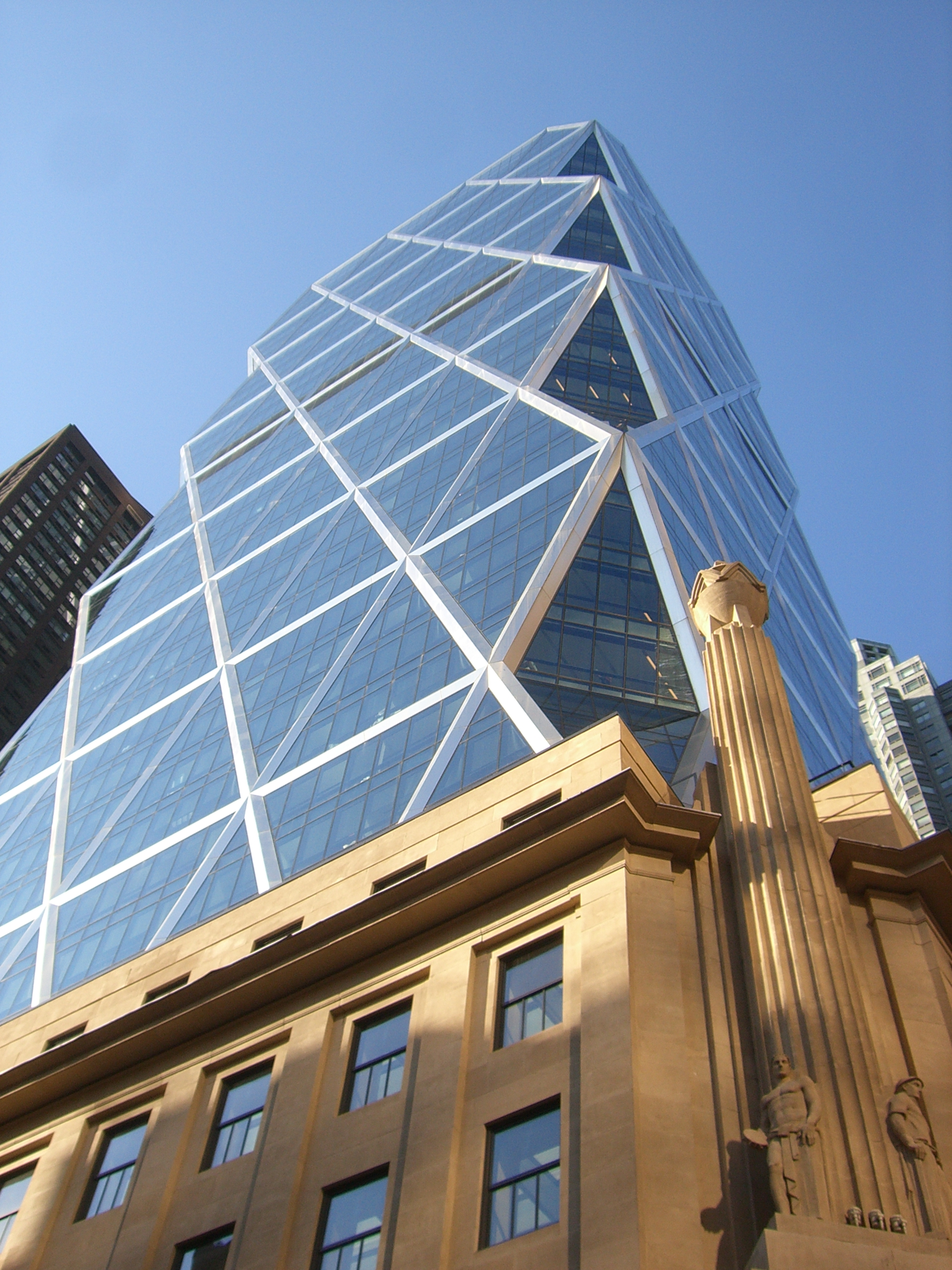
The view from 56th Street

The Hearst Magazine Building was too small to house all the Hearst Corporation divisions, although it was the company's headquarters. By the beginning of the 21st century, the corporation's 1,800 employees occupied nine structures near Columbus Circle. The Hearst Magazine Building contained the Good Housekeeping offices, corporate offices, and Hearst's media division; the corporation's other magazines were published in the other buildings.

==== Development ====
In 2000, the Hearst Corporation announced plans to consolidate all its divisions by completing its long-delayed tower. Planning for the tower had been fueled in part by the development of other media headquarters nearby, (Note: These included the AOL Time Warner Center at Columbus Circle, the New York Times Building and the Condé Nast Building at Times Square.) such as the planned New York Times Building and the Condé Nast Building at 4 Times Square. Hearst reportedly met with Polshek Partnership early in the planning process. In February 2001, the Hearst Corporation announced that it had hired Norman Foster to design a tower addition, in part because of Foster and Partners' experience redeveloping historic sites such as the Reichstag and British Museum buildings. Foster's selection, which followed his failed bid to design the New York Times Building, led one architect to say: "My guess is Hearst wanted to outdo the Times."

Despite the September 11 attacks later that year, the Hearst Corporation decided to proceed with the project. Foster said that the board felt that "If we don't do anything, [the terrorists] have won". Foster also wanted to create a structure that represented "optimism and a sign of good things to come". Following the attacks, Foster and Hearst decided to restrict visitor access to part of the atrium and relocate the tower's core away from the street. Other parts of the design were also reviewed, but the tower's glass facade was retained. Foster's team designed over one hundred plans for the tower. He filed plans for the construction of the Hearst Tower that October, and the LPC approved the tower one month later. Hearst had consulted with the community to allay any concerns, and the approval took less than three hours. The only major opponent was the Historic Districts Council, whose executive director said that the tower "does not respond to, respect, or even speak to its landmark base".

The Hearst Tower was the first major skyscraper in Manhattan built after the September 11 attacks. Before the start of construction, Good Housekeeping moved to another Hearst Corporation building, and two thousand employees were relocated. Work on the Hearst Tower began on April 30, 2003, and the Hearst Magazine Building's interior was demolished in the middle of that year. The original framework was left intact until new steel beams were installed. The landmark facade was preserved and shored up during the tower's construction, and it was cleaned for $6 million. Steel construction began in March 2004. The floor slabs were installed at an average rate of one floor every four days, and the curtain wall was installed at a rate of one floor every six days. The Hearst Tower was topped out on February 11, 2005.

==== Post-expansion ====
The first employees moved into the tower during either May or June 2006, but it was not officially completed until that October. The Hearst Tower cost $500 million. Shortly after the Hearst Tower was completed, it became the first New York City building to receive a LEED Gold certification for its overall design. (Note: 7 World Trade Center, the city's first building with any LEED Gold certification, was completed in May 2006. However, 7 World Trade Center's certification only applied to its exterior, while the Hearst Tower's certification applies to both its exterior and interior.) Because of the building's environmental features, it used 25% less energy than a typical similar-sized skyscraper. The LEED certification was upgraded to Platinum in 2012.

Although the upper floors were quickly occupied, the ground-floor retail space remained vacant for several years; any retail lease had to be approved by several Hearst Corporation officials, and the space's asking price was $400 per square foot ($4,300/m^{2}) per month. The space was not occupied until 2011, when cookware retailer Sur La Table opened a store. Panera Bread leased a ground-level storefront in 2022, intending to open a flagship store; the shop opened that November.

== Impact ==
Before the tower's construction, the Hearst Magazine Building was considered an indication of unexecuted plans. One observer, writing to the LPC in 1982, said that the structure was designed in "an unusual style, by an unusual (and unusually talented) designer". Architectural writer Eric Nash wrote in 1999 that the Hearst Magazine Building was a vestige of the original tower that had been planned on the site. Two years later, Herbert Muschamp of The New York Times wrote that, despite Urban's experience with both theatrical design and architecture, the Hearst Magazine Building was little more than a standard Art Deco building. Christopher Gray, another Times reporter, described the structure as having a funereal quality. William Randolph Hearst left little indication of what he thought the Hearst Magazine Building represented.

Critics noted the tower's contrast with the older base. The architectural critics Justin Davidson and Edwin Heathcote both described the tower as floating above the base due to the sharply differing architectural styles. Nicolai Ouroussoff of The New York Times wrote that the tower "may be the most muscular symbol of corporate self-confidence to rise in New York since the 1960s", even as its design clashed with that of the Hearst Magazine Building. The architectural writer Joseph Giovannini described the building's atrium as one of the few instances of a "great public room in Manhattan", comparing it to Foster's earlier Commerzbank Tower and 30 St Mary Axe. The writer Paul Goldberger regarded the Hearst Tower as the city's best-looking skyscraper since 140 Broadway, which had been completed in 1967. Another writer, in a 2025 article for The Nation, wrote that "the marriage of old and new was at once harmonious and startling", with the base's masonry facade and the tower's diagrid complementing each other. Conversely, an Architectural Record writer likened the tower to a misplaced military structure, while Herbert Muschamp called it a "glass square peg in a solid square hole".

The Hearst Tower addition received the 2006 Emporis Skyscraper Award as the best skyscraper in the world completed that year. The American Institute of Architects' 2007 List of America's Favorite Architecture ranked the Hearst Tower among the top 150 buildings in the United States. The tower received a British Construction Industry Award in 2007, and it was a runner-up for the Royal Institute of British Architects' Lubetkin Prize. The Hearst Tower received the 10-Year Award from the Council on Tall Buildings and Urban Habitat in 2016, which cited the tower's "structural complexity" as a consideration in its value and performance. Since 2018, Hearst Television stations have used on-screen graphics based on the diagrid of the tower's facade.

== See also ==
- Art Deco architecture of New York City
- List of New York City Designated Landmarks in Manhattan from 14th to 59th Streets
