= Viacom =

Viacom, an abbreviation of Video and Audio Communications, may refer to:

- Viacom (1952–2005), a former American media conglomerate
- Viacom (2005–2019), a former company spun off from the original Viacom
- Viacom18, a joint venture between Paramount Global and TV18 in India until 2024
  - Viacom18 Studios, the film subsidiary of Viacom18

== See also ==
- CBS (disambiguation)
- Paramount (disambiguation)
- Paramount Global, an American media conglomerate known as ViacomCBS until 2022
