= Mary Porter Beegle =

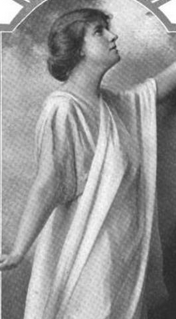
- Mary Porter Beegle, from a 1916 publication.
- Born: c. 1881; Ocean Grove, New Jersey, U.S.
- Died: c. 1966 (aged 84–85)
- Other name: Mary Urban
- Occupations: College administrator, theatre professional
- Spouse: Joseph Urban

Mary Porter Beegle, also known as Mary Urban, was an American dancer, theatre professional, and college administrator.

== Early life ==
Mary Porter Beegle was born in Ocean Grove, New Jersey, the daughter of William Henry Beegle and Lavinia B. Johnson Beegle. Her father was a newspaper publisher. She earned a bachelor's degree from Columbia University in 1909. She attended the Chalif Normal School of Dancing, and pursued further dance studies in Germany.

A relative, whose married name was Mary Porter Beegle (1818-1888), wrote hymns and published two books of poetry, Alethea (1886) and Ocean Spray (1876).

== Career ==
Beegle taught dance and physical education at Manhattan Trade School for Girls from 1904 to 1911, and at Barnard College from 1910 to 1916. She wrote an academic article, "Hygiene and Physical Education in Trade Schools for Girls" (1914), about the physical education side of her work, but she advised elsewhere that "the dance must not be taught as a species of athletic hygiene," but "for the sheer joy of doing, the joy of creation and expression."

At Barnard, she was also active in the school's Greek Games event, an annual celebration of Greek language and culture. She was involved in planning and staging pageants inspired by Greek dance and drama. She chaired the festival committee of the Drama League of America's New York chapter when it marked Shakespeare's tercentenary with an original production, Caliban by the Yellow Sands (1916), directed by Beegle.

She co-authored a book, Community Drama and Pageantry (1916, with Jack Randall Crawford), outlining her work on outdoor pageants. Also with Crawford, she wrote The Book of the Pageant of Elizabeth (1914). She spoke at a conference on pageantry in New York in 1914. She created The Romance of Work (1914), featuring dances based on women's factory work, and directed a similar dance component of a 1916 pageant in Newark. "Pageantry's whole point lies in the fact that it is not, and cannot be, the work of a single individual," she explained. "It is a co-operative art in which there is opportunity for all to share according to the measure of their time and skill." Beegle was among the founders of Camp Fire Girls, an American youth organization.

From 1934 to 1939, she ran a community arts center, Waverly Terrace Auditorium, in Yonkers. She started working at the New School for Social Research in 1939, in various administrative roles, including Assistant Treasurer, Director of Promotion, and Director of Public Relations. She retired from the New School in the 1950s.

Beegle survived the sinking of the SS Andrea Doria in 1956, but lost much of her work, and her late husband's papers, in the accident. She sued the ship lines for $350,000 for the irretrievable losses.

== Personal life ==
Beegle married Viennese architect and theatrical designer Joseph Urban in 1919, as his second wife. She was widowed when he died in 1933. She and her step-daughter donated Joseph Urban's surviving papers to Columbia University. Some of her professional papers are in the archives of the New School for Social Research.
