= Robert Weinberg (urban planner) =

American architect and urban planner

Robert C. Weinberg
- Born: December 18, 1901; New York City, US
- Died: January 25, 1974 (aged 72)
- Education: Harvard School of Architecture
- Occupations: Architect, urban planner

Robert Charles Weinberg (December 18, 1901 – January 25, 1974) was an American architect and urban planner. He is mostly known for his projects in his native New York City, particularly relating to parks. After graduating from Ethical Culture Fieldston School he attended Harvard where he earned several degrees. For most of his life, he lived on New York's Washington Square and also maintained a house in Ridgefield, Connecticut. He died in 1974; he and his wife left a portion of their estate to Harvard which established a professorship in his name.

Weinberg worked for the New York City Parks Department and the New York Department of City Planning, where his disagreements with Robert Moses led to his dismissal. He was instrumental in preserving Washington Square Park, and the Jefferson Market Courthouse, as well as being involved in unsuccessful attempts to save Pennsylvania Station and the Ziegfeld Theatre. He was a fellow of the American Institute of Architects, ran his own architecture firm, taught at a number of New York schools, and provided on-air commentary for WNYC's Around New York radio program.

== Biography ==
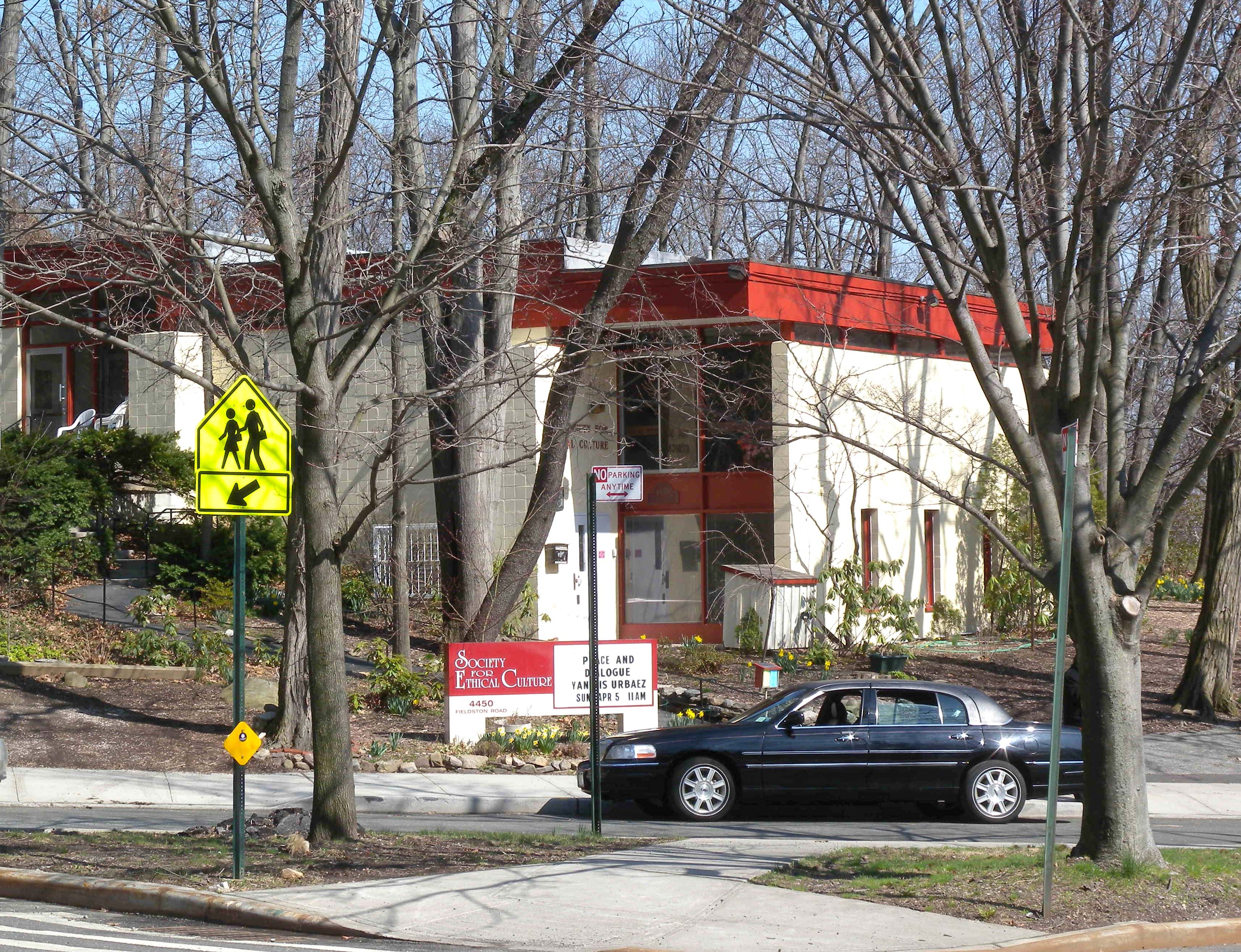
Ethical Culture Fieldston School in Riverdale

Robert Charles Weinberg was born on December 18, 1901 in New York City to Charles and Lily Weinberg (née Hayman) and grew up on the Upper West Side of Manhattan. Weinberg attended the Ethical Culture Fieldston School, earned a B.A. degree from the Harvard School of Architecture in 1926 and another degree (Note: Sources variously refer to it as either a second B.A. or a graduate degree.) from the Harvard School of City Planning in 1931.

Weinberg married Marian King in 1951 with the couple announcing plans to live at Washington Square in New York. In addition to his home in New York, he also maintained a residence in Ridgefield, Connecticut. Robert died of cancer in 1974 at Memorial Hospital in New York. Marian died in 1984, bequeathing a portion of their estate to Harvard University. In 1992, the Harvard School of Design established the Robert C. and Marian K. Weinberg Professorship of Architectural History. An earlier bequest in 1978 established the Arthur Comey Scholarship which supports students in the Harvard Graduate School of Design's Master in Urban Planning program.

== Career ==
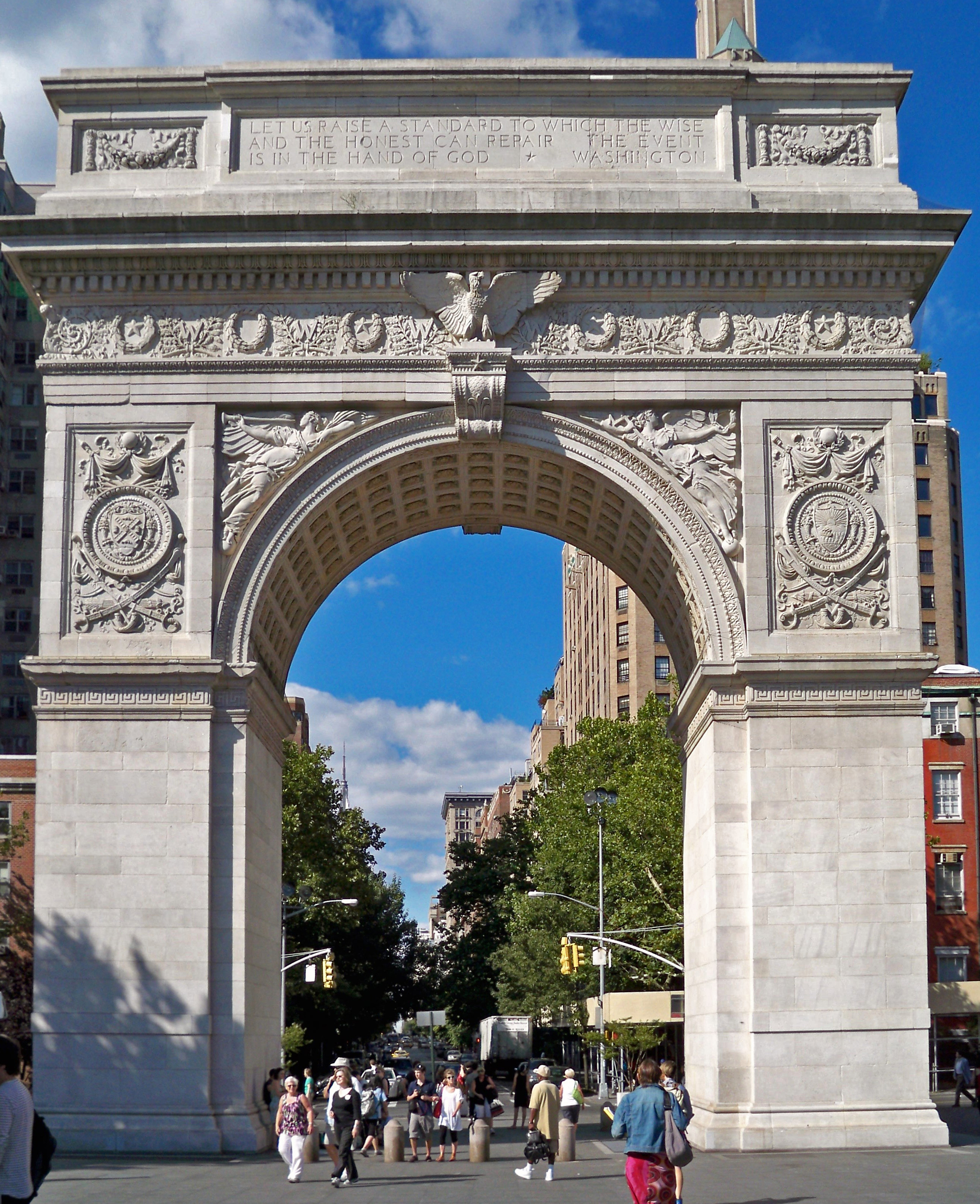
Washington Square Arch in 2008, looking north up 5th Avenue

Weinberg ran his own firm, Robert C. Weinberg and Associates, in addition to teaching at several universities. His private projects were mostly in the Greenwich Village section of Manhattan and the Riverdale neighborhood of the Bronx. From 1966 to 1971, he was "critic-at-large in architecture and planning" at WNYC radio, where he discussed a variety of topics related to city planning during twice-weekly talks. Although mainly known for his work in New York, he also did work for the Chicago Housing Authority and the Cleveland Planning Commission.

Weinberg was hired by the newly formed New York City Parks Department in 1934. Previously, each of the city's five boroughs had its own independent parks department. These were consolidated in 1934, with Robert Moses serving as the commissioner.

Weinberg and Moses often disagreed on their philosophies of designing parks. Weinberg believed that parks should be customized to the neighborhood, while Moses preferred a more uniform design for all parks. From the late 1930s through the early 1950s, Weinberg was part of the coalition opposing a number of renovation plans for Washington Square Park that were supported by Moses. These efforts culminated in the park being closed to vehicles in 1958. In 1939, Weinberg joined the New York Department of City Planning. Robert Moses was responsible for Weinberg's departure from the department in 1941.

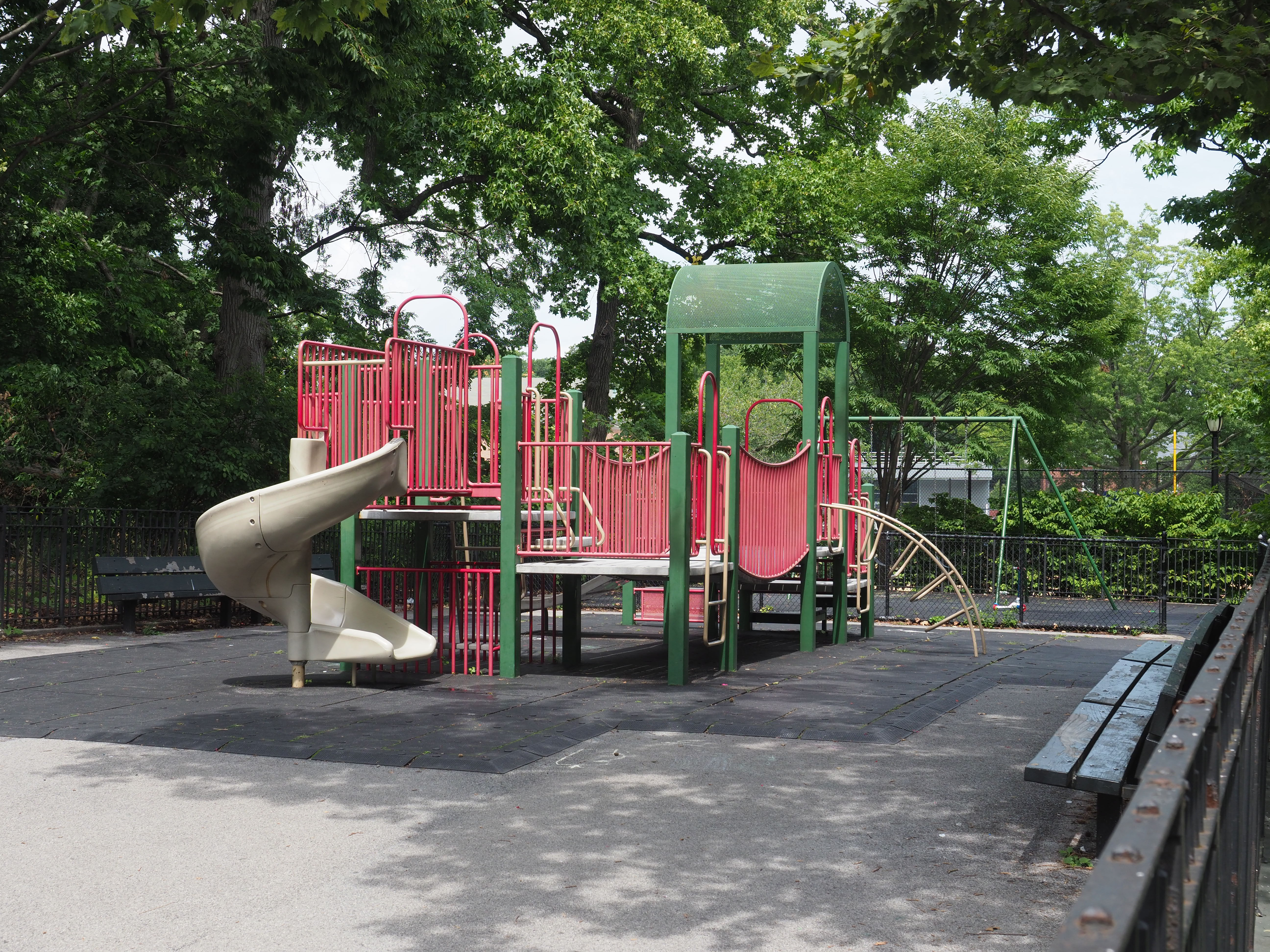
Play structure in Vinmont Veteran Park

Weinberg was known for designing the Vinmont Houses in the Riverdale area of The Bronx. The development consisted of 30 one and two family attached houses in a wooded area near Mosholu Avenue and West 255th Street, built as affordable rental units. In 1978, the property, along with two others nearby, was sold to real estate developer Joel Wiener who attempted to sell the houses for approximately $100,000 each. The residents formed a tenants' association, hired an attorney, and embarked on a three-year legal battle. In 1981, Wiener sold the houses to the residents, at $50,000 for the one-family units and $60,000 for the two-families.

The name Weinberg is German for "Wine Mountain", which translates to "Vinmont" in French. The Vinmont section of Riverdale, Vinmont Road, Vinmont Houses, and Vinmont Veteran Park all trace their names to Weinberg in this way. He had plans to build 340 low-income housing units on another nearby plot of land he owned in Riverdale. That project failed to get approval, and the plot was eventually sold to the USSR to build a residential compound for diplomats and their families.

== Preservationist activities ==
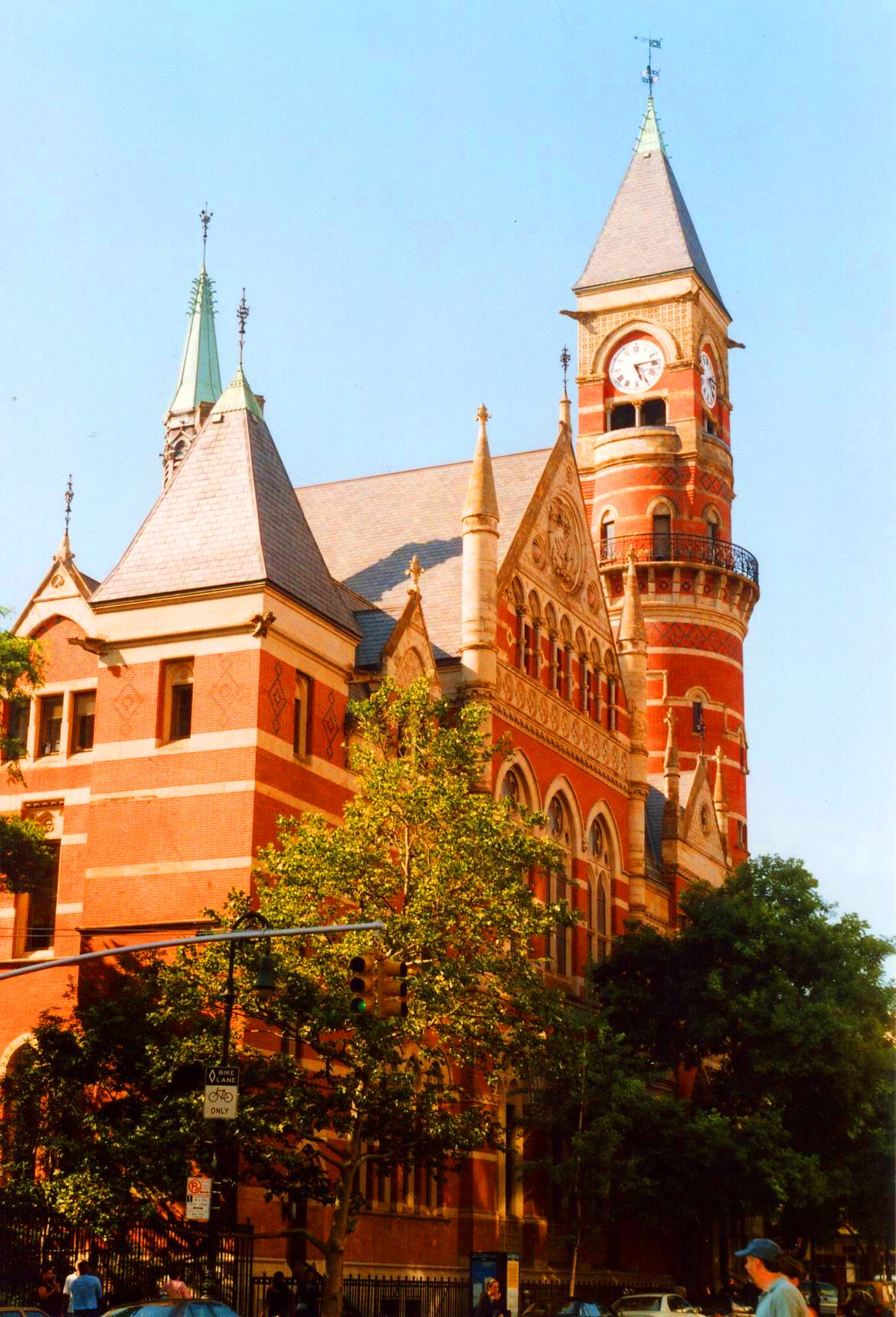
Jefferson Market Courthouse in 2003

Weinberg was instrumental in preserving the Jefferson Market Courthouse building in the 1960s. Built in 1876, it was vacant by 1950 and slated to be demolished. A preservation drive by local residents led to the formation of The Committee for a Library in the Courthouse, with Weinberg convincing the New York Public Library to adopt the building. It is now the Jefferson Market Library.

Weinberg was also a member of the Action Group for Better Architecture in New York (AGBANY) in the early 1960s. The group was most known for working to preserve the original Pennsylvania Station building designed by McKim, Mead & White.The effort was unsuccessful and the building was demolished in 1963. He also attempted to preserve the Ziegfeld Theatre on 52nd Street however this too was demolished.

== Academic, civic, and professional affiliations ==
Weinberg was a member of the American Institute of Architects, chaired the institute's Joint Committee on Design Control and was co-editor of their 1958 Planning and Community Appearance report. He served on the institute's civic design, historical buildings, and Housing committees, and was elected a fellow in 1970. He was a member of the Society of Architectural Historians, served as the book review editor for the Journal of the American Institute of Planners from 1947 to 1959 and was the chair of their New York Regional Chapter.

Weinberg was an adjunct professor at New York University, where he created a program in City Planning. He also taught at the Pratt Institute, the New School for Social Research, Yale and Cooper Union. He was a member of the Municipal Art Society, using his position there to advocate for landmarks preservation via the Bard Act.
