= Paramount Theater =

Paramount Theater or Paramount Theatre may refer to:

== Canada ==
- Scotiabank Theatre or Paramount Theatre, a chain of theatres owned by Cineplex Entertainment
  - Scotiabank Theatre Toronto or Paramount Theatre Toronto

== China ==
- Paramount (Shanghai) or Paramount Theatre, Shanghai, China

== United Kingdom ==
- Birmingham Odeon - Originally known as the Paramount Theatre
- Paramount Theatre, Manchester or OdeonTheatre

== United States ==
- American Broadcasting-Paramount Theatres, an American cinema chain
- Paramount Theatre (Casa Grande, Arizona), a National Register of Historic Places listing in Pinal County, Arizona
- Paramount Theatre (Los Angeles), California
- Paramount Theatre (Oakland, California)
- Paramount Theatre (Denver), Colorado
- Paramount Theatre Building (Palm Beach, Florida)
- Paramount Theater (Atlanta), Georgia
- Paramount Theatre (Aurora, Illinois)
- Paramount Theatre (Anderson, Indiana)
- Paramount Theatre (Cedar Rapids, Iowa)
- Paramount Arts Center or Paramount Theater, Ashland, Kentucky
- Paramount Theatre (Boston, Massachusetts)
- Paramount Theater (Springfield, Massachusetts)
- Paramount Theater (Austin, Minnesota)
- Paramount Theater (St. Cloud, Minnesota)
- Paramount Theater (Clarksdale, Mississippi), a Mississippi Landmark
- Paramount Theatre (Asbury Park, New Jersey)
- Paramount Theatre (Brooklyn), New York
- Paramount Theatre (Middletown, New York)
- Paramount Theatre (New York City)
- The Paramount (Huntington, New York)
- Paramount Theatre at Madison Square Garden or the Theater at Madison Square Garden, New York City
- Arlene Schnitzer Concert Hall or Paramount Theatre, Portland, Oregon
- Paramount Theatre and Office Building, a National Register of Historic Places listing in Sullivan County, Tennessee
- Paramount Theatre (Abilene, Texas)
- Paramount Theater (Baton Rouge, Louisiana)
- Paramount Theatre (Alexandria, Louisiana)
- Paramount Theatre (Austin, Texas)
- Paramount Theater (Rutland, Vermont)
- Paramount Theater (Charlottesville, Virginia)
- Paramount Theatre (Doswell, Virginia), former name of a theatre in the Kings Dominion amusement park
- Paramount Theatre (Seattle), Washington

== See also ==
- The Paramount (disambiguation)
