= Paramount Theatre Building (Palm Beach, Florida) =

- U.S. National Register of Historic Places
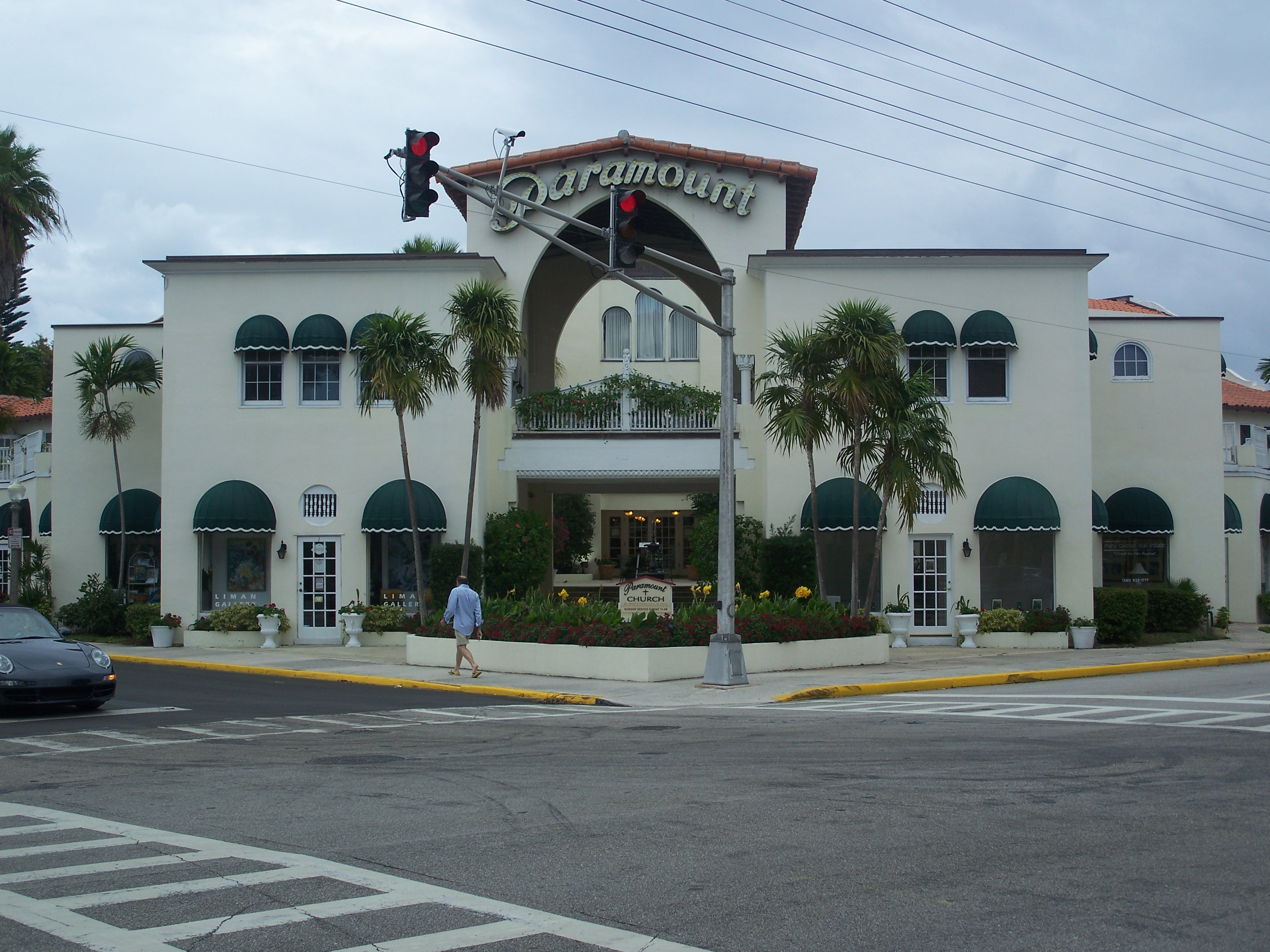
- Facade of the theater, in 2010

- Location within Florida Location within the United States
- Location: Palm Beach, Florida
- Coordinates: 26°43′9″N 80°2′14″W
- Architect: Joseph Urban
- Architectural style: Moorish Revival; Spanish Colonial Revival
- NRHP reference No.: 73000599
- Added to NRHP: December 12, 1973

The Paramount Theatre Building is a historic movie palace and theater and now church, located at 145 North County Road and Sunrise Avenue, Palm Beach, Florida.

== History ==
It was designed in the Moorish Revival and Spanish Colonial Revival styles by Joseph Urban in 1926. Urban also designed the nearby Mar-a-Lago and the Palm Beach Bath and Tennis Club.

By contrast to the Ziegfeld Theatre (1927), which Urban designed to bathe the audience in warmth and a general atmosphere of colorful gaiety, the Paramount Theatre employs simple lines and a cool, leisured palette of silver and green. "The theatre," Urban explained, "is not an escape from the life around, but a part of it, fitting into the rhythm of the community. The architecture of the Paramount Theatre … is accordingly simple, spacious, Southern."

On December 12, 1973, it was added to the U.S. National Register of Historic Places.

== Church ==
The Paramount Theatre Building now houses the Paramount Church, a non-denominational Christian church in Palm Beach. The Senior Pastor and Founder of Paramount Church is Rev. Dwight Stevens. The church sold the building in March 2021 to Woerner Holdings. Currently it serves as a high end shopping center for Palm Beach locals.
