= The Paramount =

The Paramount may refer to:

- Paramount Theater (disambiguation), several venues
- The Paramount Ballroom, Alec Lazo's ballroom in West Palm Beach, Florida, U.S.
- The Paramount, San Francisco, a high-rise apartment building in San Francisco, California, U.S.
- Paramount Hotel, a hotel in New York City, New York, U.S.
- The Paramount, Boston, restaurant in Boston, Massachusetts, U.S.
