= Paramount =

Paramount (from the word paramount meaning "above all others") may refer to:

== Entertainment and media ==
- Skydance Corporation, formerly known as Paramount Skydance Corporation, an American mass media company
  - Paramount Pictures, an American theatrical film production company of Skydance Corporation
  - Paramount Home Entertainment, an American home video distribution unit of Paramount Pictures
  - Paramount Animation, an American animated production division of Paramount Pictures
  - Paramount+, an American streaming video service formerly known as CBS All Access
- Paramount Global, an American former mass media company that merged into Paramount Skydance Corporation

== Music ==
- Paramount Records, an American jazz and blues label active between 1917 and 1932
- ABC-Paramount Records, name of ABC Records between 1955 and 1966
- Paramount Records (1969), another American record label, active between 1969 and 1974
- Paramount Records (Australia), an Australian record label active in the 1950s

== Places ==
- Paramount (Shanghai), a Chinese historical nightclub and dance hall
- Paramount, California, U.S., a city in Los Angeles County
- Paramount Building at 1501 Broadway, Manhattan, New York, U.S.
- The Paramount at Buckhead, a residential skyscraper in Atlanta, Georgia, U.S.
- Paramount Tower, an under construction skyscraper; future tallest building in Nashville, Tennessee
- Paramount Tower Hotel & Residences a skyscraper in Dubai, UAE

== People ==
- Paramount chief, the highest-level political leader in a region or country
- Paramount leader, the highest leader in the People's Republic of China
- Lord paramount, a lord who held his fief from no superior authority

== Other uses ==
- Paramount, a difficulty level in Dance Dance Revolution

== See also ==
- Paramount Theater (disambiguation)
