= Vinmont Veteran Park =

Playground in the Bronx, New York

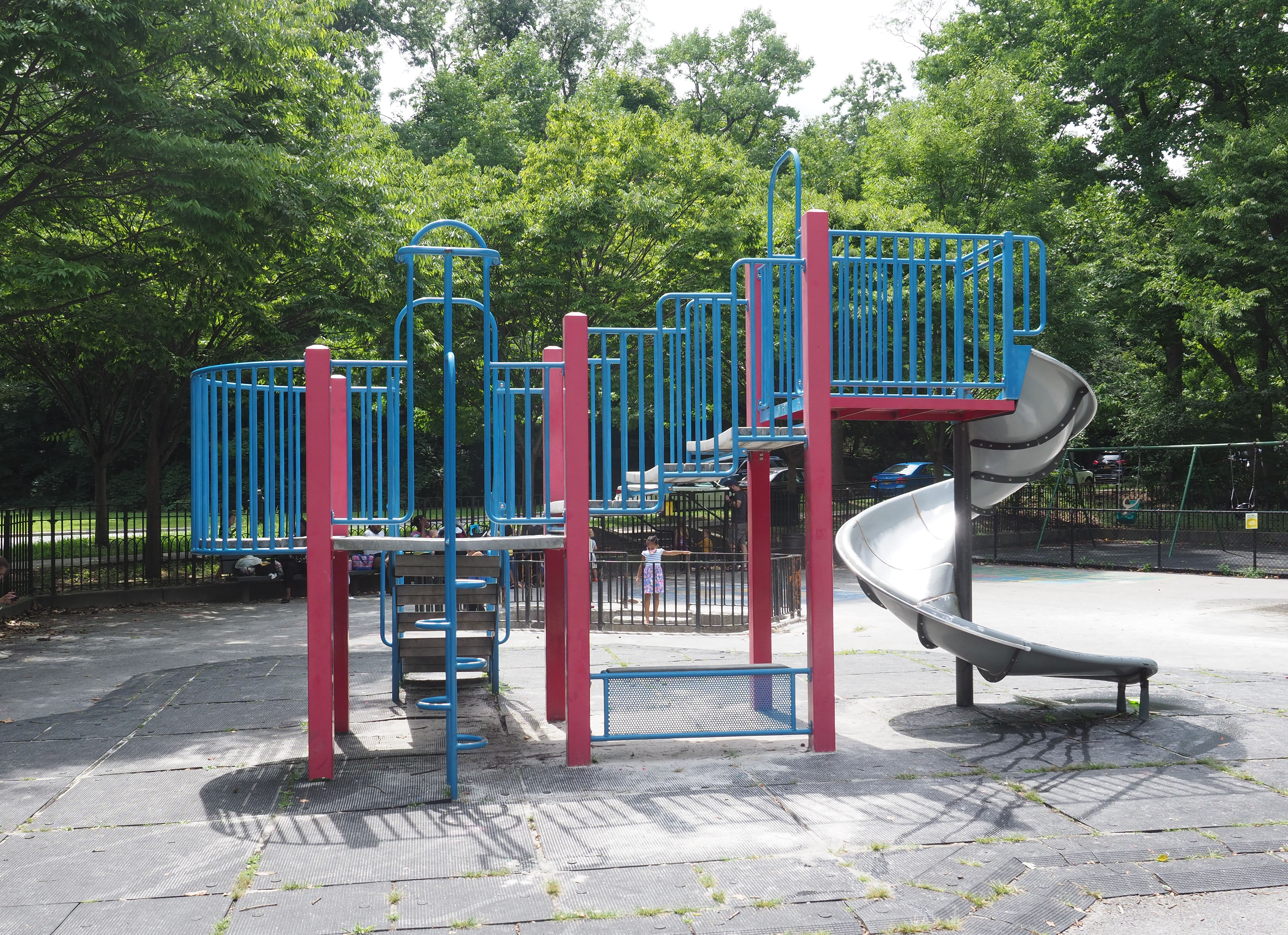
- Interactive map of Vinmont Veteran Park
- Type: Playground
- Location: Bronx, New York
- Coordinates: 40.9023°N 73.9050°W
- Area: 3.5 acres (1.4 hectares)
- Owner: New York City Department of Parks and Recreation

Vinmont Veteran Park is a 3.5-acre (1.4-hectare) park and playground in the Riverdale section of The Bronx. It includes bathrooms, a playground, a woodland area and the Sid Augarten baseball field. The site was acquired by New York City in 1945 and 1947 and opened as a park in 1951. Originally named the PS 81 Playground after a neighboring public school it was renamed in 1986 in honor of military veterans in the Vinmont neighborhood.

== Description ==
The park covers an area of 3.5 acres (1.4 hectares) in the Riverdale neighborhood of The Bronx in New York City. It includes bathrooms and a playground with a spray shower and is wheelchair-accessible. The park incorporates the Sid Augarten baseball field. The park includes a woodland area with native trees, primarily red and white oak, black cherry, and sweetgum. Other species include Norway maple, black locust, American elm, pignut hickory, and redtwig dogwood. The park is adjacent to Bronx Public School 81 and bordered by Riverdale and Mosholu avenues and West 254th and 256th streets.

== History ==
The land for the park was acquired by New York City in 1945 and 1947 via condemnation. The park opened on September 26, 1951. Originally named PS 81 Playground after the neighboring school, it was renamed in November 1986. The park was renovated in 1992 to add new fencing, benches, picnic tables, and water fountains. Landscaping was also done, and the adjacent Sid Augarten Field received a new backstop at this time. Another renovation project in 2002 improved the children's play and swing units, rebuilt the spray shower, and added new plantings. The ball field received further improvements in 2013.

== Namesakes ==
The park is named after the Vinmont neighborhood and honors local military veterans. The Vinmont neighborhood itself is named after Robert Weinberg, an employee of the New York City Department of Parks in the 1930s. Weinberg was a city planner whose work included urban parks and landscape architecture; he was the principal architect of the Vinmont Houses project in Riverdale. The name Vinmont is the French translation of Weinberg, which is German for Wine Mountain.

The ball field adjacent to the park honors Sid Augarten, who was the commissioner of the North Riverdale Baseball League, which still plays at this location.
