= Joseph Urban =

Austrian-American architect (1872–1933)

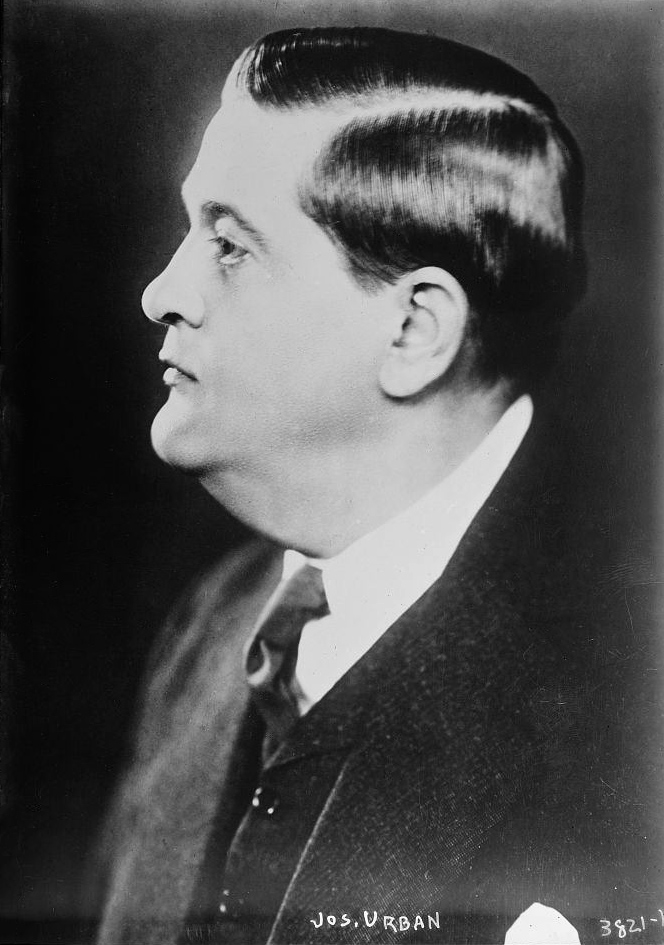
- Joseph Urban, c. 1915
- Born: May 26, 1872; Vienna, Austria-Hungary
- Died: July 10, 1933 (aged 61); New York City, U.S.
- Occupations: Architect, illustrator, scenic designer
- Spouse: Mary Porter Beegle (m. 1919)

Joseph Urban (May 26, 1872 – July 10, 1933) was an Austrian-American architect, illustrator, and scenic designer.

== Life and career ==
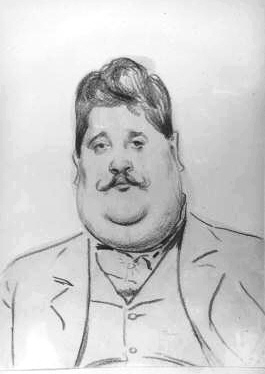
Caricature by Rudolf Swoboda (c. 1900)

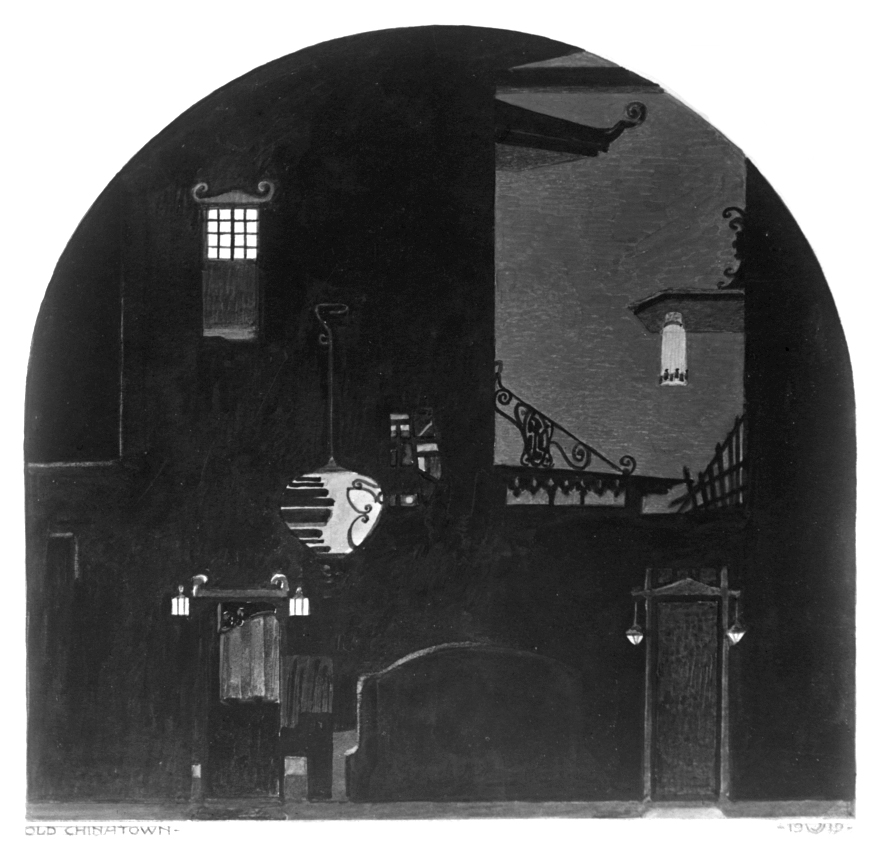
Joseph Urban set design drawing for Ziegfeld Follies of 1919

Joseph Urban was born on May 26, 1872, in Vienna. He received his first architectural commission at age 19 when he was selected to design the new wing of the Abdin Palace in Cairo by Tewfik Pasha. He became known around the world for his innovative use of color, his pointillist technique, and his decorative use of line. He designed buildings throughout the world from Esterhazy Castle in Hungary to the Ziegfeld Theatre in New York.

Urban studied architecture at the Academy of Fine Arts Vienna under Karl von Hasenauer. In 1890, he and his brother-in-law, Heinrich Lefler, were among the founders of the Hagenbund. Urban's early work with illustrated books was inspired by Lefler and, together, they created what are considered seminal examples of children's book illustration.

Urban immigrated to the United States in 1911 to become the art director of the Boston Opera Company. He was already an accomplished international architect, illustrator and theatre set designer with over 50 productions from his home Vienna Royal Opera, the Champs-Elysées Opera, and Covent Garden. By applying points of primary colors side by side on the canvas backdrops he was able to create and light theatre sets of vivid color reminiscent of the works by Monet or Seurat. In 1914, he moved to New York City, where he designed productions for the Metropolitan Opera and the Ziegfeld Follies; he continued to design for Florenz Ziegfeld Jr. until 1931. William Randolph Hearst was an important client and supporter. He also co-produced with Richard Ordynski Percy MacKaye's "Community Masque" Caliban by the Yellow Sands.

Beginning in 1917, he was frequently engaged as stage designer by the Metropolitan Opera of New York City. In all he created set designs for 47 new productions at the house through 1933. His many designs provided the opera company with a cohesive production style throughout the tenure of General Manager Giulio Gatti-Casazza. Many of Urban's settings remained in the company's repertoire into the 1950s.

Soon his sets and innovative lighting caught the eye of Florenz Ziegfeld Jr., who hired him to design the Follies in the 1920s. Urban went to work creating a stunning night-club with glass balconies, a moving stage, and rainbow lighting effects. This Danse de Follies soon became a blend of ideas and talent before serving in the Follies theatre. Urban had success after success in his creating of the Follies' sets, and William Randolph Hearst, a media tycoon, took notice and wanted to hire Urban to work on his films starring Marion Davies, his mistress, and previous Follies starlet. Hearst came to an understanding with his friend Ziegfeld that Urban's work for him would not interfere with any of the Follies productions. Urban worked on 25 films over the years.

Urban's last major project was designing the sets for the Broadway musical Melody. He died July 10, 1933, of a heart attack at his apartment at the St. Regis Hotel in Manhattan, where he had been convalescing following surgery in May.

== Legacy ==
Urban was one of the originators of the American Art Deco style. Extant buildings include the Mar-a-Lago, The Bath and Tennis Club, and The Paramount Theater all in Palm Beach, Florida; The New School building in New York City; and the base of the Hearst Tower in New York City. The stage lighting gel Roscolux Urban Blue #81, still used today, is named for him.

== Work ==
=== Architecture and interior design ===
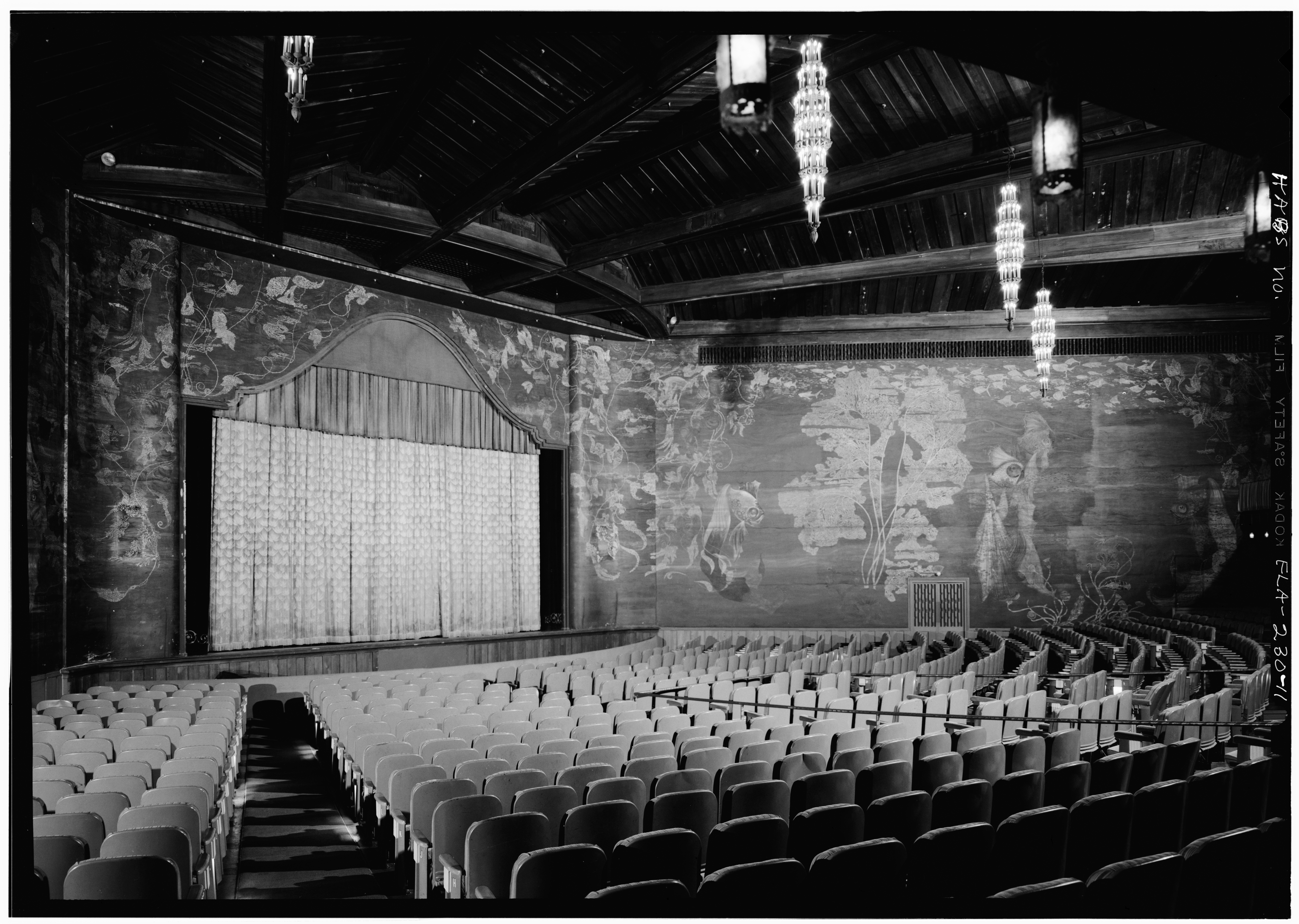
Paramount Theatre interior, Palm Beach, Florida

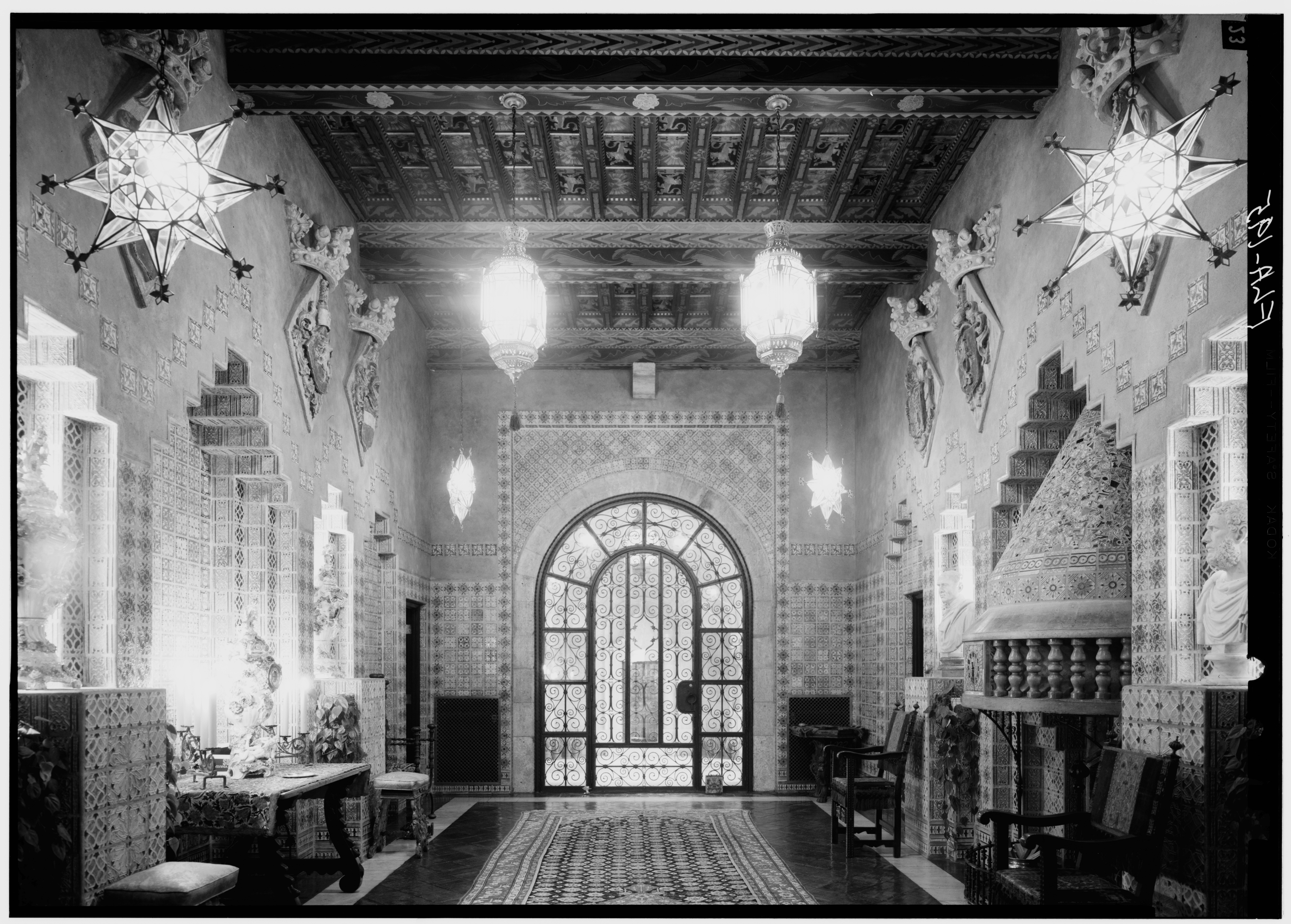
Entrance hallway, Mar-a-Lago, Palm Beach, Florida

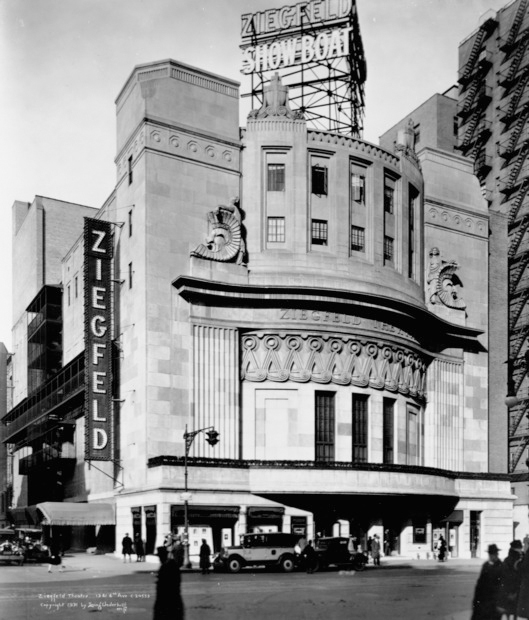
Ziegfeld Theatre, New York City

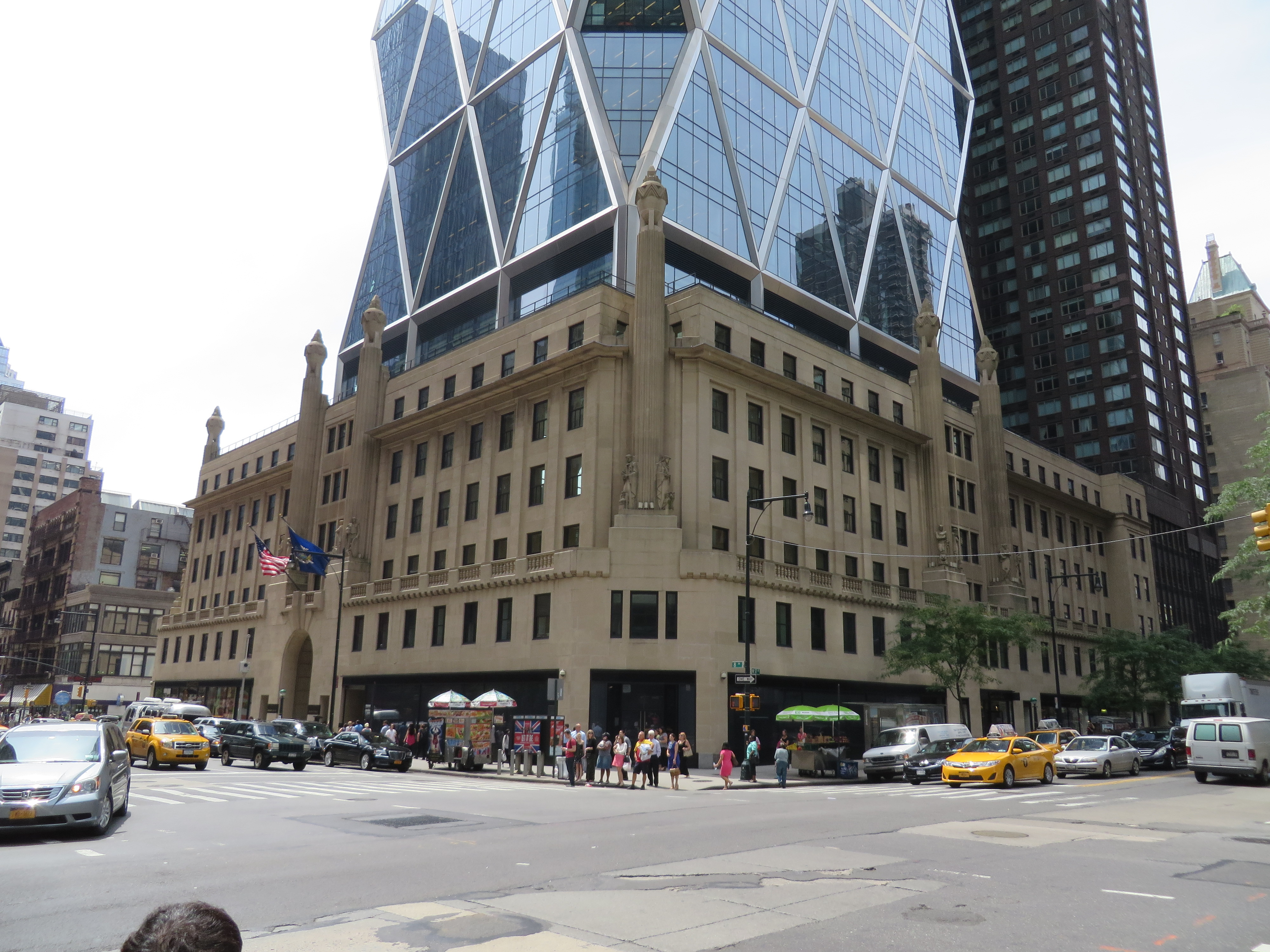
Base of Hearst Tower, New York City

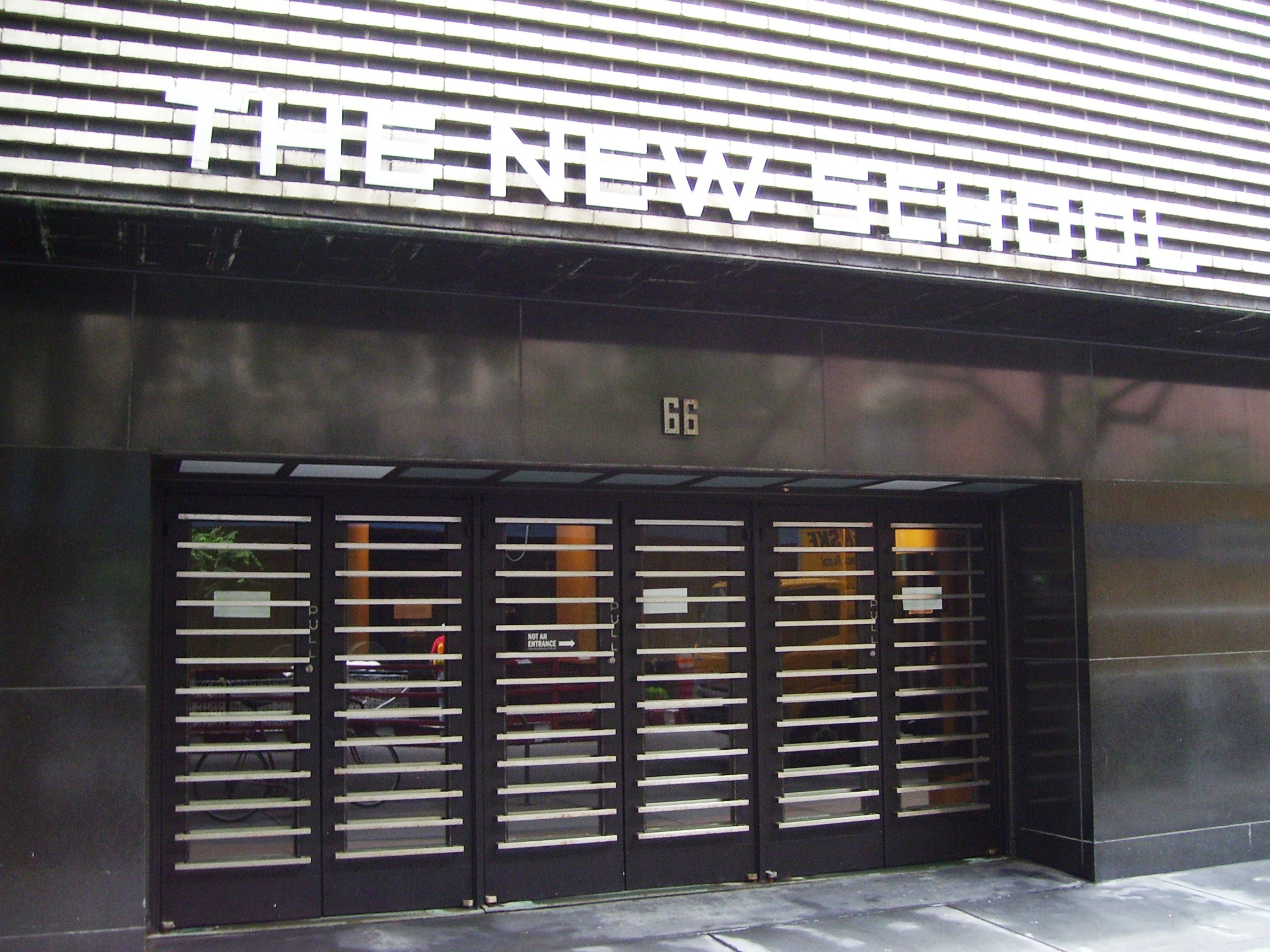
Entrance to The New School, New York City

This partial list omits unrealized projects.

- 1900: Wohn- und Bürohaus Wien 8, Buchfeldgasse 6 (with Hermann Stierlin)
- 1902: Villa Goltz, Wien 19, Grinzinger Straße 87
- 1903: Villa Wiener, Wien 13, Veitingergasse 21
- 1904: Exhibition space, Austrian Pavilion, Louisiana Purchase Exposition, St. Louis, Missouri
- 1907: Villa Redlich, Wien 19, Kreindlgasse 11
- 1907: Wohnhaus, Wien 19, Krottenbachstraße 11
- 1907: Villa Max Landau, Semmering, Südbahnstraße 83
- 1910: Villa Dr. Mair, Scheiblingkirchen, Kreuzackergasse 43
- 1920: Sherman Hotel Panther Room, Chicago
- 1922: Wiener Werkstätte showroom, New York City
- 1925: C.C. Lightbown House, 4839 Colorado Avenue, NW, Washington, DC, Permit #7278, March 10, 1925, cost $25,000.
- 1926: Mar-a-Lago, Palm Beach, Florida
- 1926: Demarest Little Castle, Palm Beach, Florida
- 1926: Paramount Theatre, Palm Beach, Florida
- 1927: Anthony Biddle residence, Palm Beach, Florida
- 1927: Bath and Tennis Club, Palm Beach, Florida
- 1927: Ziegfeld Theatre, New York City
- 1926–27: St. Regis Hotel Roof Garden
- 1928: Hotel Gibson Roof Garden, Cincinnati, Ohio
- 1928: Bossert Hotel, Grill Room, Brooklyn
- 1928: Bedell Store, New York City
- 1928–29: William Penn Hotel, Urban Room, Pittsburgh, Pennsylvania
- 1929: International Magazine Building, New York City
- 1929: Central Park Casino
- 1929: Metropolitan Museum of Art 11th annual exhibition of American Industrial Art
- 1929: The Gingerbread Castle, Hamburg, New Jersey
- 1930: The New School for Social Research, New York City
- 1929–31: Atlantic Beach Club, Long Island, New York
- 1931: Park Avenue Restaurant, 128 E 58th Street
- 1932: Congress Hotel, Joseph Urban Room, Chicago, Illinois
- 1929: Urban Room, Omni William Penn Hotel, Pittsburgh, Pennsylvania
- 1933: Katherine Brush Apartment
- 1933: Color scheme for the Century of Progress International Exposition

=== Book illustrations ===
- 1905: Grimm's Märchen
- 1907: Kling-Klang Gloria
- 1911: Andersen Kalender
- 1914: Marienkind
