= Ziegfeld Theatre (1927) =

Former Broadway theater in Manhattan, New York

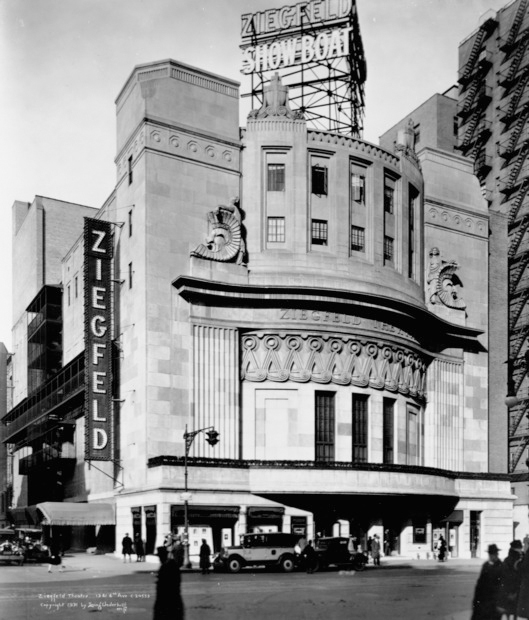
- Ziegfeld Theatre during the run of Show Boat (1927–29)
- Interactive map of Ziegfeld Theatre
- Address: 1341 Sixth Avenue; Manhattan, New York City; United States
- Coordinates: 40°45′45″N 73°58′43″W
- Owner: Florenz Ziegfeld, Jr.
- Capacity: 1,638
- Type: Broadway

Construction
- Opened: February 2, 1927
- Demolished: 1966
- Architects: Joseph Urban and Thomas W. Lamb

The Ziegfeld Theatre was a Broadway theatre located at 1341 Sixth Avenue, corner of 54th Street in Manhattan, New York City. It was built in 1927 and despite public protests, it was razed in 1966.

== History ==
With a seating capacity of 1,638, the Ziegfeld Theatre was named for the famed Broadway impresario Florenz Ziegfeld, Jr., who built it with financial backing from William Randolph Hearst. Designed by Joseph Urban and Thomas W. Lamb, it opened February 2, 1927, with the musical Rio Rita. The theater's second show was also its most famous—Jerome Kern's landmark musical Show Boat, which opened December 27, 1927, and ran for 572 performances.

Due to the decline in new Broadway shows during the Great Depression, the theater became the Loew's Ziegfeld in 1933 and operated as a movie theater until showman Billy Rose bought it in 1944.

NBC leased the Ziegfeld Theatre for use as a television studio from 1955 to 1963. The Perry Como Show was broadcast from the theater beginning in 1956. It was also used to present the televised Emmy Awards program in 1959 and 1961.

In 1963 the Ziegfeld Theatre reopened as a legitimate Broadway theater. This was short-lived, however, as Rose began to assemble abutting properties for a new real estate project. The musical Anya, which opened November 29, 1965, for 16 performances, was the last musical to play at the theater, which was torn down in 1966 to make way for a skyscraper, the Fisher Bros. Burlington House.

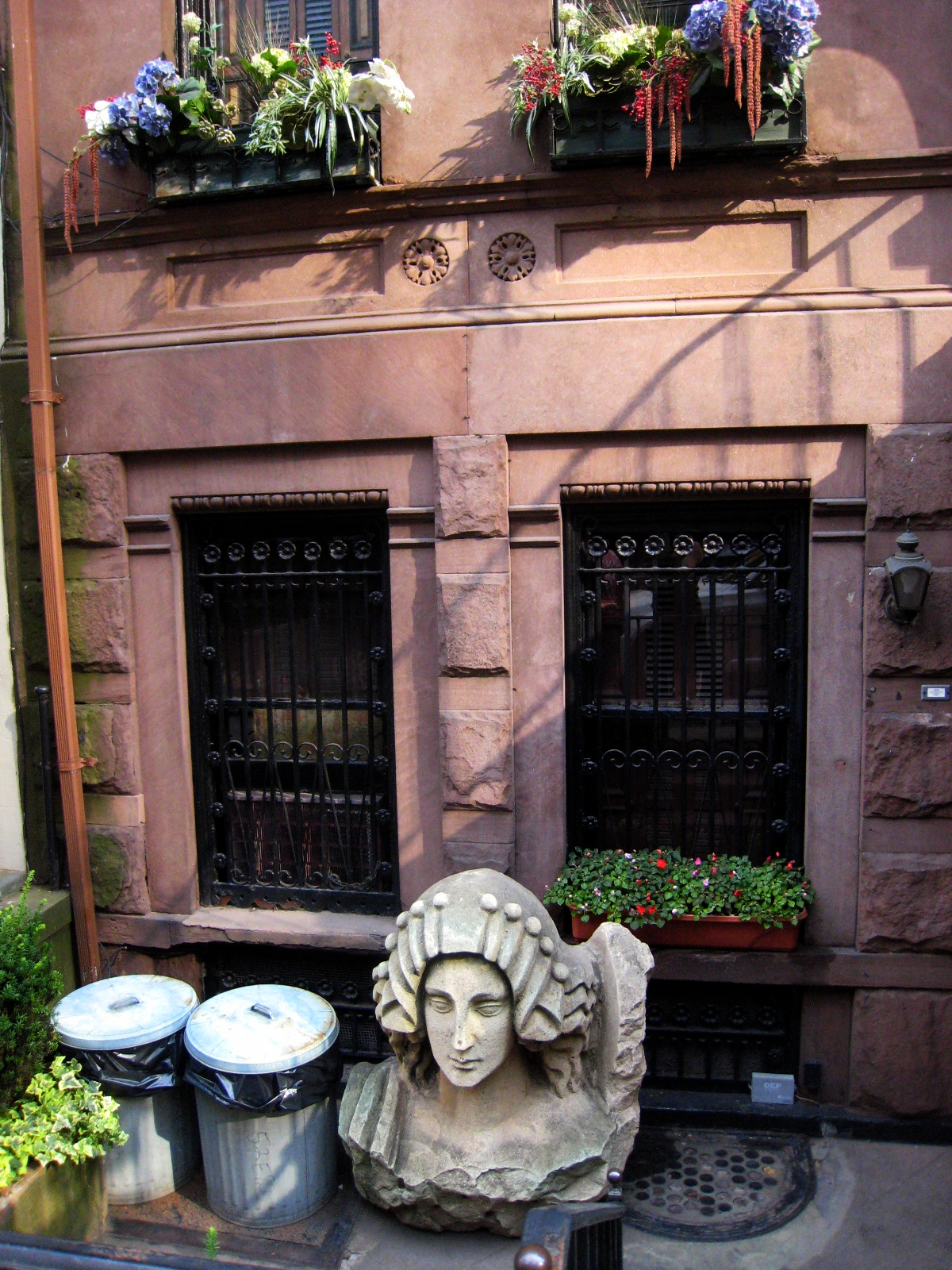
Fragment of the Joseph Urban facade of the Ziegfeld Theatre

"The Ziegfeld was one of those buildings that went just a few years too soon," wrote architectural critic Paul Goldberger. "Had it been able to hold on just a bit longer, a later age would surely have seen its value and refused to sanction its destruction."

A fragment of the Joseph Urban facade, a female head, can be seen in front of the private home at 52 East 80th Street.

The box from the cornerstone and its contents are held by the Billy Rose Theatre Division of the New York Public Library for the Performing Arts.

== Notable Broadway premieres ==
- Rio Rita (1927)
- Show Boat (1927–29)
- Ziegfeld Follies of 1931 (1931)
- Brigadoon (1947–48)
- Gentlemen Prefer Blondes (1949–51)
- Kismet (1953–55)
- Foxy (1964)

== Notable Broadway revivals ==
- The Red Mill (revised version) (1945)
- Show Boat (revised version) (1946–47)
- Of Thee I Sing (1951)
- Music in the Air (1951)
- Antony and Cleopatra and Caesar and Cleopatra on alternate nights (1951–52). (Laurence Olivier and Vivien Leigh with the Old Vic company, imported from London.)
- Porgy and Bess (1952) (The famous world tour production featuring Leontyne Price, Cab Calloway, and William Warfield.)
